= Jean-Marie Beurel =

French Catholic priest and missionary

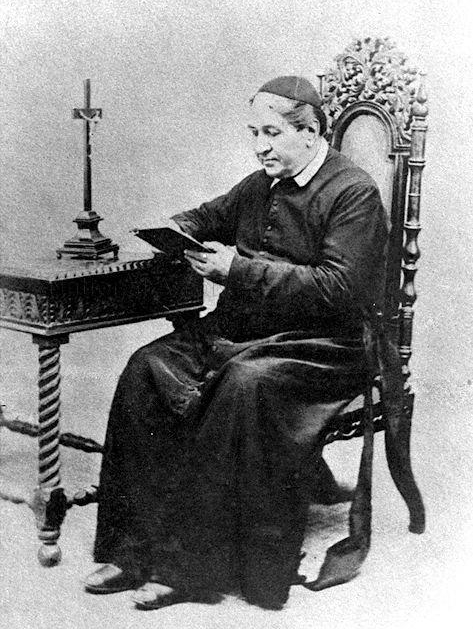
- Title: Reverend Father

Personal life
- Born: 5 February 1813 Plouguenast, France
- Died: October 3, 1872 (aged 59) Paris, France
- Resting place: Montparnasse Cemetery, Paris, France
- Home town: Plouguenast, France

Religious life
- Religion: Roman Catholic
- Denomination: Roman Catholic
- Institute: Missions Étrangères de Paris
- Consecration: Cathedral of the Good Shepherd

Senior posting
- Based in: Singapore
- Reason for exit: illness

Reverend Father Jean-Marie Beurel (5 February 1813 – 3 October 1872) was a French Catholic priest and missionary who founded the Cathedral of the Good Shepherd, the St Joseph’s Institution and the Convent of the Holy Infant Jesus girls' schools in Singapore.

== Biography ==
Beurel was born on 5 February 1813 at Plouguenast, in Lower Brittany, France. He joined the Missions Étrangères de Paris as a deacon on 23 August 1838 and was assigned to the Mission of Siam. At the age of 26, he left France on 16 March 1839 and would arrived Singapore on 29 October 1839.

Beurel had come as a parish priest for the Roman Catholic chapel on Bras Basah Road. When Bishop Jean-Paul-Hilaire-Michel Courvezy talked of extending the chapel because it was getting too small, Father Beurel suggested that a church be built elsewhere so that the current site could be used for a school for boys.

Fund-raising for the cathedral began in 1840. Faced with a shortage of funds, Beurel travelled as far as China and the Philippines to seek help. Contributions were received 4,000 francs from Queen Marie-Amelie Therese of France, 3,000 Spanish dollars from the Archbishop of Manila and the Protestant community in Singapore.

Of the two architectural plans submitted, the chosen design was by Denis McSwiney, a former clerk to George Drumgoole Coleman. The foundation stone was laid on 18 June 1843 by John Conolly, a merchant resident of Singapore. Cathedral of the Good Shepherd was completed at the cost of 18,355.22 Spanish dollars, and was consecrated by Father Beurel on 6 June 1847, before a crowd of more than 1,500 people.

In 1848, Beurel asked the Straits Settlements government for land to build a school, but was refused. He left Singapore on 28 October 1850 for France. While he was in France, Beurel approached the Reverend Mother Saint François de Sales de Faudoas, the 14th Superior General of the Infant Jesus Sisters, to enlist some sisters in starting a school for girls. He returned to Singapore on 29 March 1852 with six Brothers from the Brothers of the Christian Schools and two Infant Jesus Sisters.

In May 1852, Beurel and the Brothers founded Saint Joseph's Institution in the former chapel.

In July 1852, he asked the Straits Settlements Government once again for land next to the church for a charitable institution for girls. When he was told that there was already sufficient land given to the church, he bought a house in Victoria Street with his own money of 4,000 francs that George Drumgoole Coleman had built for H. C. Caldwell, Senior Sworn Clerk who later became Registrar of the Court. With the help of Mother Mathilde Raclot and her fellow Sisters, Town Convent, the first Convent of the Holy Infant Jesus in Singapore, was opened in February 1854. To further the expansion of the Town Convent, Beurel had acquired all the nine lots of land that would constitute the entire Convent complex.

In 1859, Beurel had completed the parochial house next to the Cathedral of the Good Shepherd.

In 1868, he returned to France on account of illness. Beurel died in Paris, France, on 3 October 1872 at the age of 59 and was buried in the Montparnasse Cemetery.

At the Cathedral of the Good Shepherd is a memorial plaque to Beurel.

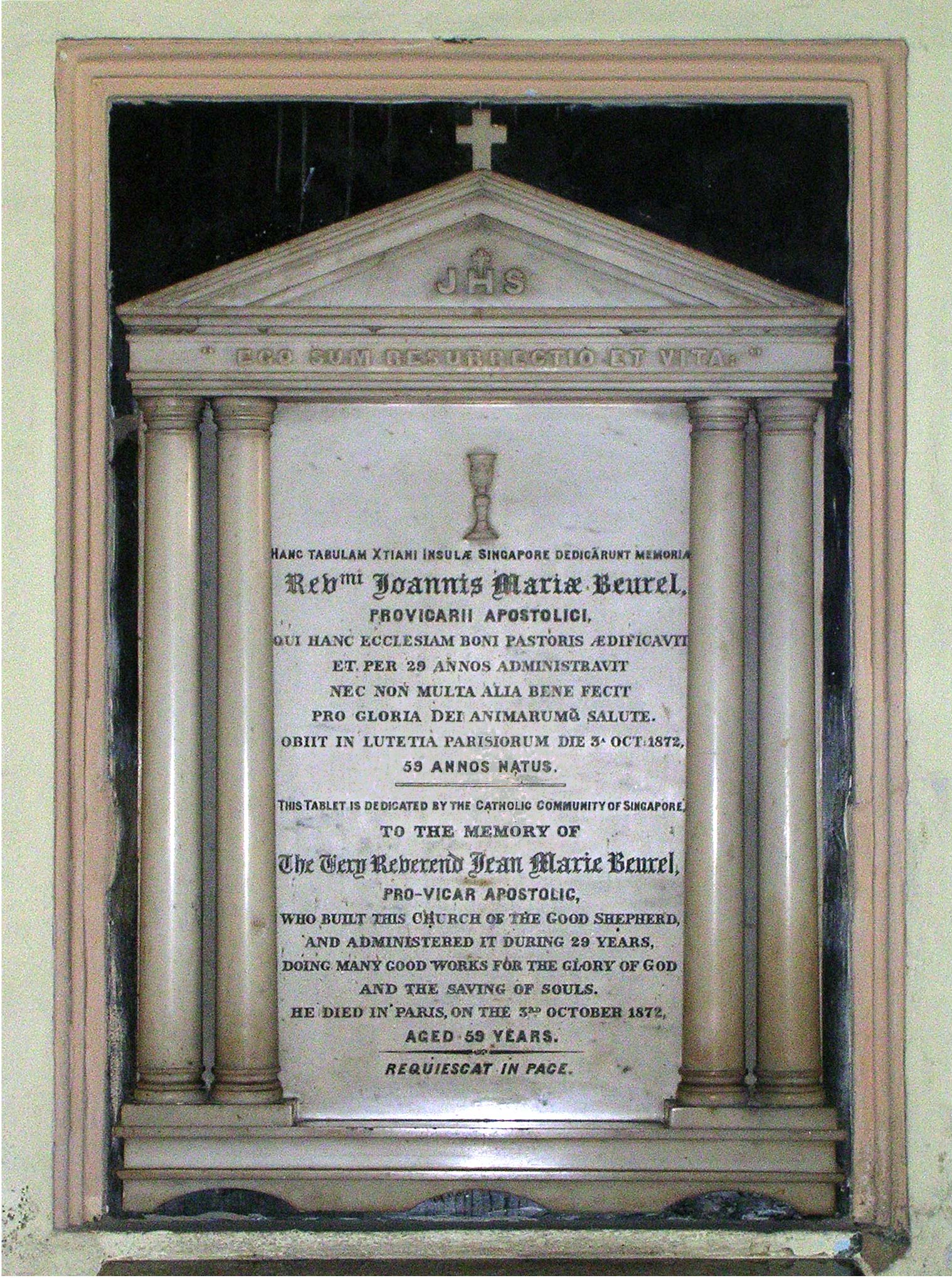
Memorial plaque to Father Jean-Marie Beurel at the Cathedral of the Good Shepherd, Singapore.

== See also ==
- Cathedral of the Good Shepherd
- Saint Joseph's Institution
- Former Saint Joseph's Institution
- CHIJMES

== Bibliography ==
- Sathisan, Dinesh. (2009). Father Jean-Marie Beurel. Retrieved 2009 20, 2009, from Father Jean-Marie Beurel | Infopedia
