= Mathilde Raclot =

French Catholic nun and missionary

Saint Mathilde Raclot
- Title: Reverend Mother

Personal life
- Born: Marie-Justine Raclot; 9 February 1814 Suriauville, Lorraine, France
- Died: 20 January 1911 (aged 96) Yokohama, Japan
- Resting place: Yokohama Foreign General Cemetery, Yokohama, Kanagawa Prefecture, Japan
- Home town: Suriauville, Lorraine, France
- Parent(s): François Raclot (father); Charlotte Ramirelle (mother)

Religious life
- Religion: Roman Catholic
- Denomination: Roman Catholic
- Institute: Congregation of the Sisters of the Holy Infant Jesus
- Monastic name: Saint Mathilde
- Consecration: Saint Maur International School

Senior posting
- Based in: Yokohama
- Reason for exit: deceased

Reverend Mother Saint Mathilde Raclot (born Marie-Justine Raclot; 9 February 1814 – 20 January 1911) was a 19th-century French Catholic nun and missionary from the Sisters of the Infant Jesus who traveled to different countries in East Asia to set up Catholic schools and orphanages. In Singapore, she founded the Convent of the Holy Infant Jesus girls' school and later traveled to Japan where she established a hospice and homeless shelter. In 2014, Mother Mathilde Raclot was inducted into the Singapore Women's Hall of Fame.

== Early life ==
Marie-Justine Raclot was born the 9 February 1814 in the small village of Suriauville in Lorraine, France. Her father, François Raclot, was the future mayor of Suriauville. Marie-Justice is born of a middle-class and pious family. She was from 12 to 16 sent to a boarding school in Langres run by the Sisters of the Infant Jesus. Her religious vocation born there, and she already dreamt of Japan.

She returned home, and at the age of 18 she joined the Congregation of the Sisters of the Holy Infant Jesus, despite her mother's disapproval. After two years she was given the religious name Saint Mathilde. Aged 21, she was sent in 1835 to teach in Bagnols-sur-Cèze, followed by Béziers in 1838, and Sète in 1841.

== Missionnary work in Malaya ==
In 1851, Jean-Marie Beurel of the Missions Etrangères de Paris, sent by Monsignor Boucho, Vicar Apostolic of Malaysia, asked to the Congregation to establing schools for girls in Singapore. The Mother Superior accepted. Sister Saint Mathilde was eager to become a missionary and had trained herself to cope with the hot weather of Malaysia. She was therefore disappointed not to have been part of the expedition.

The mission turned to disaster and second group is sent to guide and support them, including Sister Saint Mathilde Raclot. Aged 38, she became the new superior of the Missions of Asia. The sisters landed in Penang in October 1852 and began work at an orphanage and school. Mother Mathilde had the difficul task to restore discipline in the community, while she was also charged of the teaching to girls and caring for the orphans.

Under request of Father Jean-Marie Beurel, a group of sisters, including Mother Mathilde, set off for Singapore in 1854 to establish schools for girls. Due to a lack of resources and tensions with the Protestants, the mission there was very difficult. As superior of the Asian missions, Mother Mathilde contributed to the establishment and setting up of new communities, such as the one in Malacca (1859, which closed its doors in 1863 and was later re-established). Her efforts enabled the Malayan mission to flourish, to welcome numerous pupils and to care for many orphans.

After 15 years in Asia, she traveled in France to make a report of the Missions to the Mother Superior. During these discussions, the subject of a foundation in Japan was raised.

== Apostolic life in Japan ==
The gradual reopening of Japan offered missionaries the prospect of settling there to evangelize. Monsignor Petitjean, Vicar Apostolic of Japan, settled there and discovered a community of Christians who were still being persecuted by the authorities. He asked in 1872 the Infant Jesus Sisters to settle in Japan – they were the first female missionaries. Four sisters founded their first community in Yokohama and opened a school for girls. Mother Mathilde accompanied them and settled them in, then returned to Singapore. Mother Mathilde, due to her considerable responsibilities, often travelled to Malaya and Japan.

When the superior of the Japanese mission died suddenly in 1875, Mother Mathilde was sent to Yokohama to take charge on an interim basis. In 1876, at the age of 62, she was appointed superior of Japan.

In 1879, following the congregation’s recognition by the Papacy, Mother Mathilde pronounced her perpetual vows.

She made several more journeys between Japan and Malaya until 1883. Following a serious health problem, she was no longer able to travel. As Superior of Japan, Mother Mathilde oversaw the administration of the mission and was actively involved in carrying out the work of teaching and helping the poor, the sick and orphans. She had to contend with a certain degree of hostility from the local population, as well as recurring natural disasters. She was therefore constantly having to seek funds to finance the mission. The efforts of Mother Mathilde and the sisters enabled the mission to flourish. In addition to classes for poor children, the sisters also opened classes and a boarding school for young girls from the nobility who were interested in Western education, a move which Mother Mathilde did not appear to support. Religious instruction in Japanese schools was, however, banned by the Japanese government in 1891.

From 1897 onwards, due to her age, she was assisted in her work by Mother Saint Ludgarde Nourrit. She gradually began to step back from her responsibilities, whilst in 1902 she celebrated 50 years of missionary work. In 1903, her plan to establish a house in Shizuoka came to fruition. In 1907, she was finally relieved of her duties as superior of Yokohama.

== Death ==
Now free from responsibilities, she devoted herself to prayer. Her centenary was celebrated in advance on 7 July 1910. She died on 20 July 1911, aged 96, in Yokohama. She was buried during a grand funeral.

== Legacy ==
In 2014, for the bicentenary of her birth, owing to her contributions to Singapore, Mother Mathilde Raclot was inducted into the Singapore Women's Hall of Fame.
