= Church of the Redeemer =

Church of the Redeemer may refer to:

== Germany ==
- Church of the Redeemer, Bad Homburg, Hesse
- Erlöserkirche (Dresden)
- Church of the Redeemer, Sacrow, Brandenburg

== United States ==
- Old Holy Redeemer Catholic Church, Kissimmee, Florida
- Holy Redeemer Church (Eagle Harbor, Michigan)
- Church of the Redeemer (Cannon Falls, Minnesota)
- Church of the Redeemer (Longport, New Jersey)
- Church of the Redeemer (Addison, New York)
- Church of the Redeemer (Asheville, North Carolina)
- Church of the Redeemer (Orangeburg, South Carolina)
- Church of the Redeemer (Houston, Texas)
- Greater Union Baptist Church, originally built as Church of the Redeemer, Chicago, Illinois

== Elsewhere ==
- Cathedral Church of the Redeemer, Calgary, Alberta, Canada
- Church of the Redeemer (Toronto), Ontario, Canada
- Church of the Redeemer, Jerusalem, Israel (Lutheran)
- Il Redentore, Church of the Most Holy Redeemer, Venice, Italy
- Church of the Redeemer, Jamaica, Kingston, Jamaica
- Church of the Redeemer, Amman, Jordan

== See also ==
- Episcopal Church of the Redeemer (disambiguation)
- Christ the Redeemer Church
