= CHIJMES Hall =

Church in Singapore

Coordinates: 1°17′42.5″N 103°51′06.5″E

- Convent of the Holy Infant Jesus Chapel
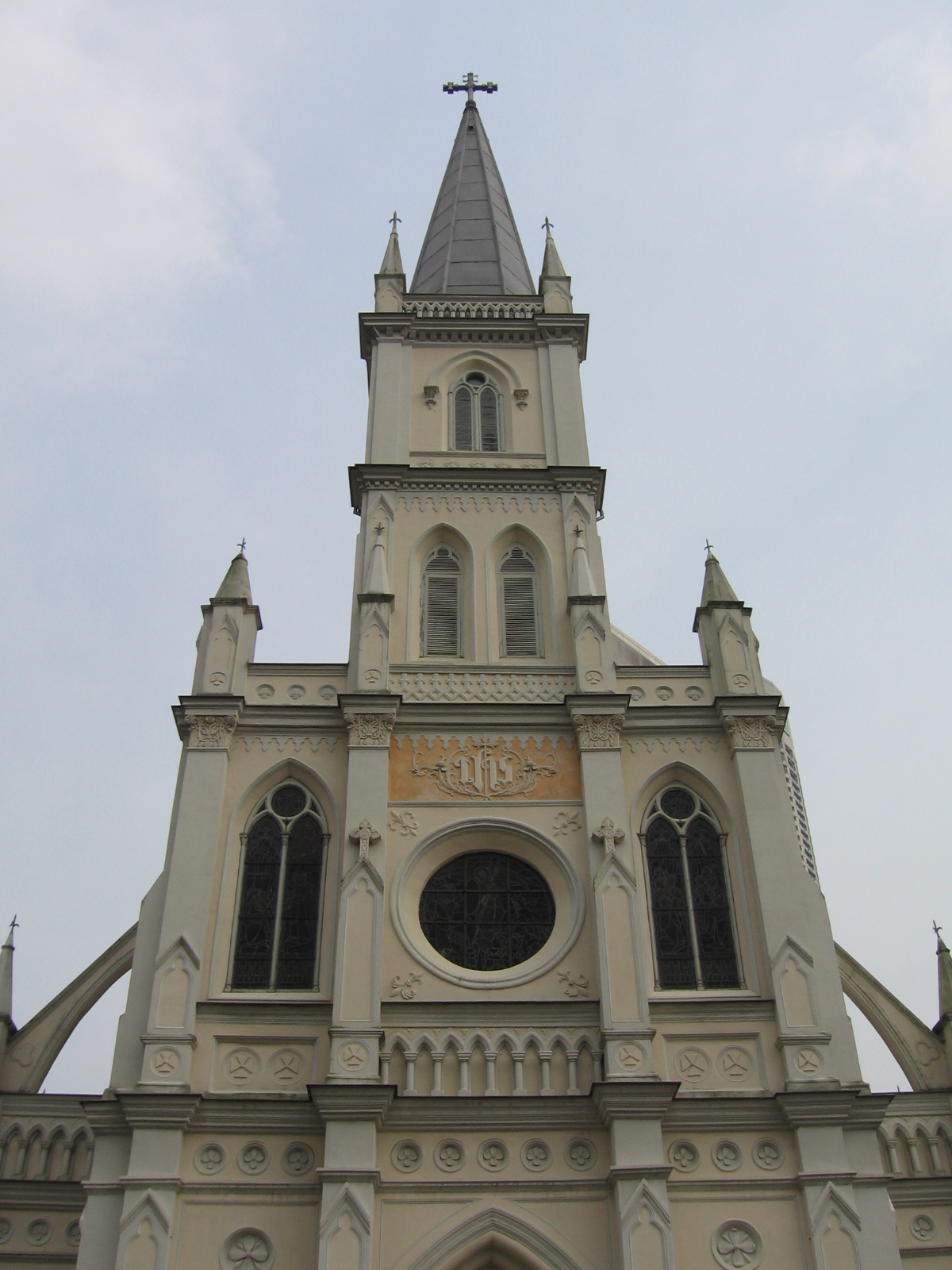

- Location in Singapore
- Location: CHIJMES, Singapore
- Country: Singapore
- Denomination: Deconsecrated
- Previous denomination: Roman Catholic
- Tradition: Catholic
- Religious institute: Convent of the Holy Infant Jesus (former)
- Churchmanship: Catholic
- Website: chijmes.com.sg

History
- Former name: Convent of the Holy Infant Jesus Chapel
- Status: former Chapel
- Founded: 11 June 1904
- Founder: Mother Mathilde Raclot
- Dedication: Infant Jesus
- Consecrated: 11 June 1904

Architecture
- Functional status: Deconsecrated
- Heritage designation: 26 October 1990
- Architect: Father Charles Benedict Nain
- Architectural type: Gothic Revival
- Years built: 1901
- Completed: 1903
- Closed: 3 November 1983

Specifications
- Capacity: 300

National monument of Singapore
- Designated: 26 October 1990; 35 years ago
- Reference no.: 23

CHIJMES Hall was the former Convent of the Holy Infant Jesus Chapel located at the CHIJMES complex in Singapore. The former chapel was designed by Father Charles Benedict Nain, it currently serves as a function hall venue for weddings and corporate events.

== History ==
The First Chapel of the Convent of the Holy Infant Jesus was built and consecrated in Singapore on 1855 for the Town Convent. As the old dilapidating chapel had become hazardous, the Sisters of the Holy Infant Jesus had to celebrate mass at the Caldwell House. They soon started fund-raising by various means for the new chapel to replace the former.

=== Architecture ===
In 1898, Father Charles Benedict Nain, an architect and priest of Church of Saints Peter and Paul, designed a new Gothic Revival chapel for the Convent. The architectural firm Swan and Maclaren would oversaw the construction of the chapel. The chapel's stained-glass windows imported from Bruges, Belgium in 1904 were designed by Jules Dobbelaere.

A five-storey spire flanked by flying buttresses marked the entrance to the chapel. The 648 capitals on the columns of the chapel and its corridors each bear a unique impression of tropical flora and birds.

=== Consecration ===
The new Convent of the Holy Infant Jesus Chapel was completed in 1903 and consecrated on 11 June 1904. The Entrance Gate pillars were later added to the front of the Chapel on the same year.

=== Deconsecration ===
In 1983, the Singapore Government had acquired the land from the Convent. The last mass was held at the chapel on 3 November 1983 before it was deconsecrated for non-religious use.

== Restoration ==
The Urban Redevelopment Authority put up the site for sale in March 1990 and gazetted the Convent of the Holy Infant Jesus Chapel and Caldwell House as national monuments on 26 October 1990, in order to preserve the ambience of the remaining buildings and designated the entire complex as a conservation area, with high restoration standards and strict usage guidelines. The remaining buildings, the Convent of the Holy Infant Jesus Chapel, Caldwell House, and the remaining former school blocks underwent extensive restoration works in 1991 and reopened as a complex known as CHIJMES in 1996.

The work was undertaken by Ong & Ong Architects with the help of Didier Repellin, Chief Architect for France’s Monuments Historiques who oversaw the meticulous restoration of the stained glass windows. New buildings were designed to complement the national monument, and the existing buildings were sensitively and tastefully restored. A new basement level was introduced, to increase the retail space and add underground car parking. New elements included tasteful fountains and new period-appropriate cast iron standard lamps. The centrepiece of the new additions is the sunken 'fountain court' which surrounds the liturgical east end of the chapel and featured a fountain with metal sculptures of foliage emitting water. This work won an Architectural Heritage Award in 1997 from the Urban Redvelopment Authority of Singapore

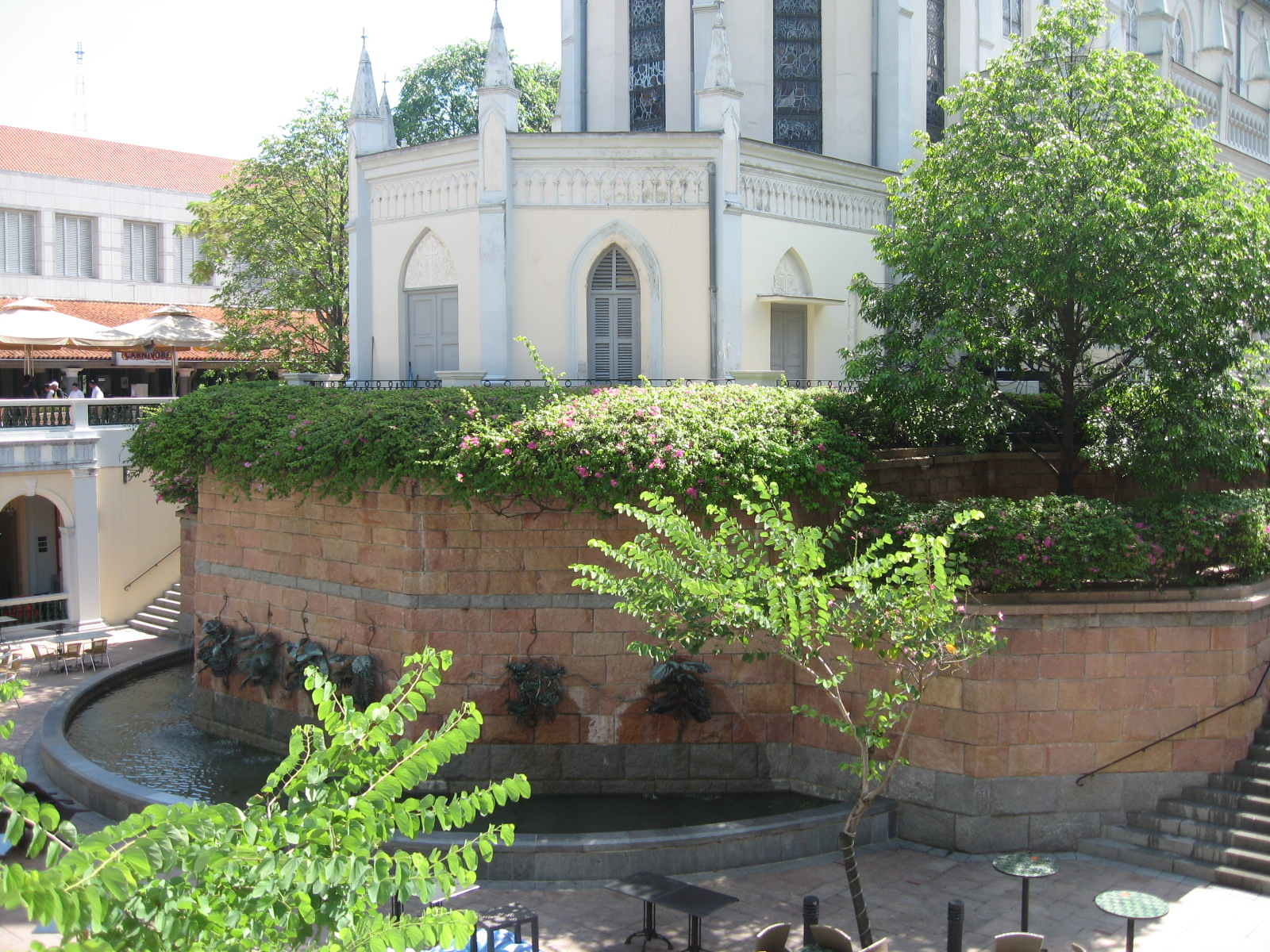

The former convent has since undergone several more renovations, in 2014 which involved the introduction of additional structures in a contrasting modernist style and temoporary-looking awnings, and the removal of many of the decorative features of the previous restoration such as the fountains, and filling in many of the former courtyard spaces with additional awnings and seating for restaurants.

The former chapel has since been renamed to CHIJMES Hall. Its function hall is managed by the Watabe Singapore, and currently serves as a venue for wedding and corporate functions.

== Gallery ==
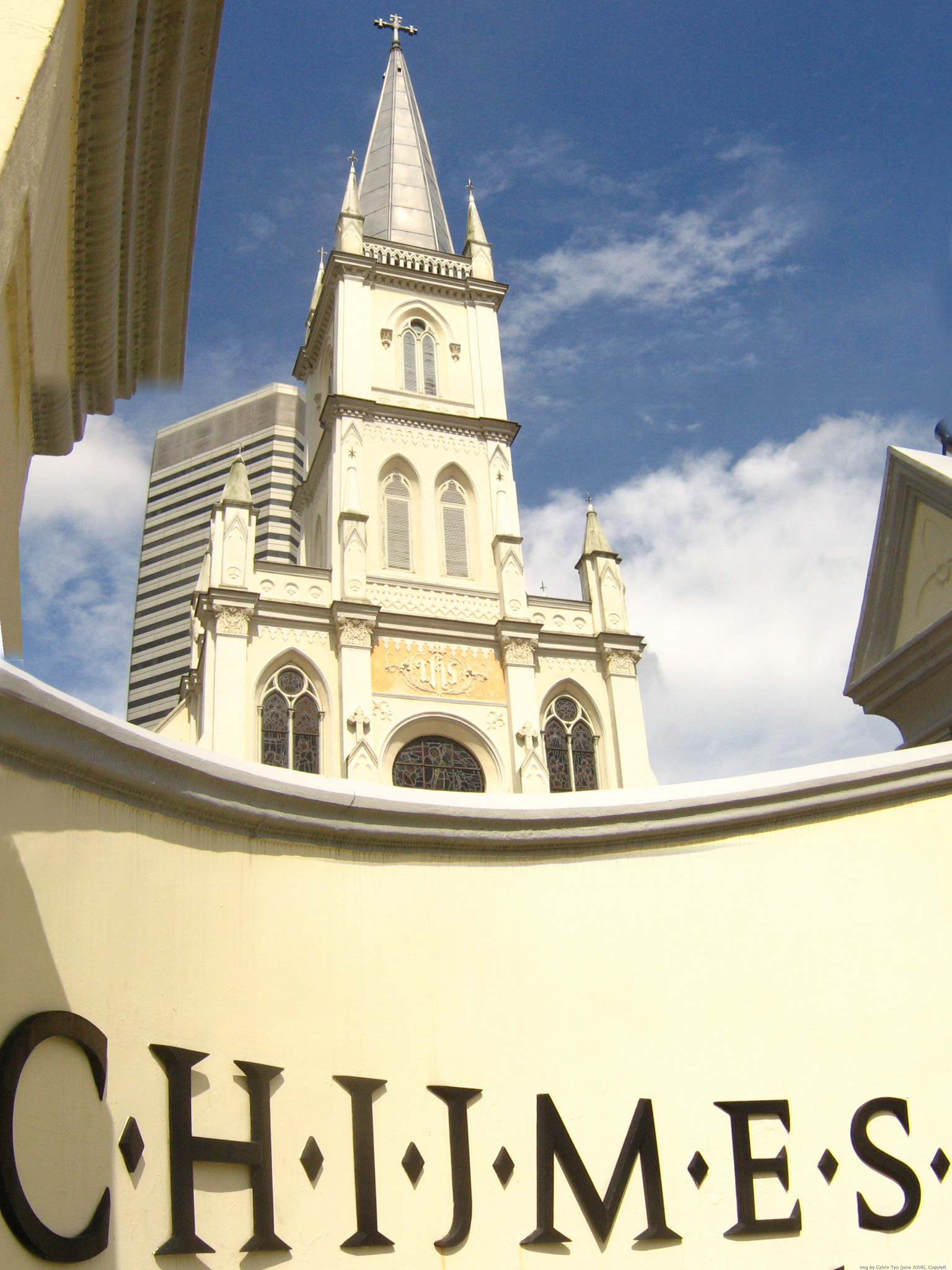

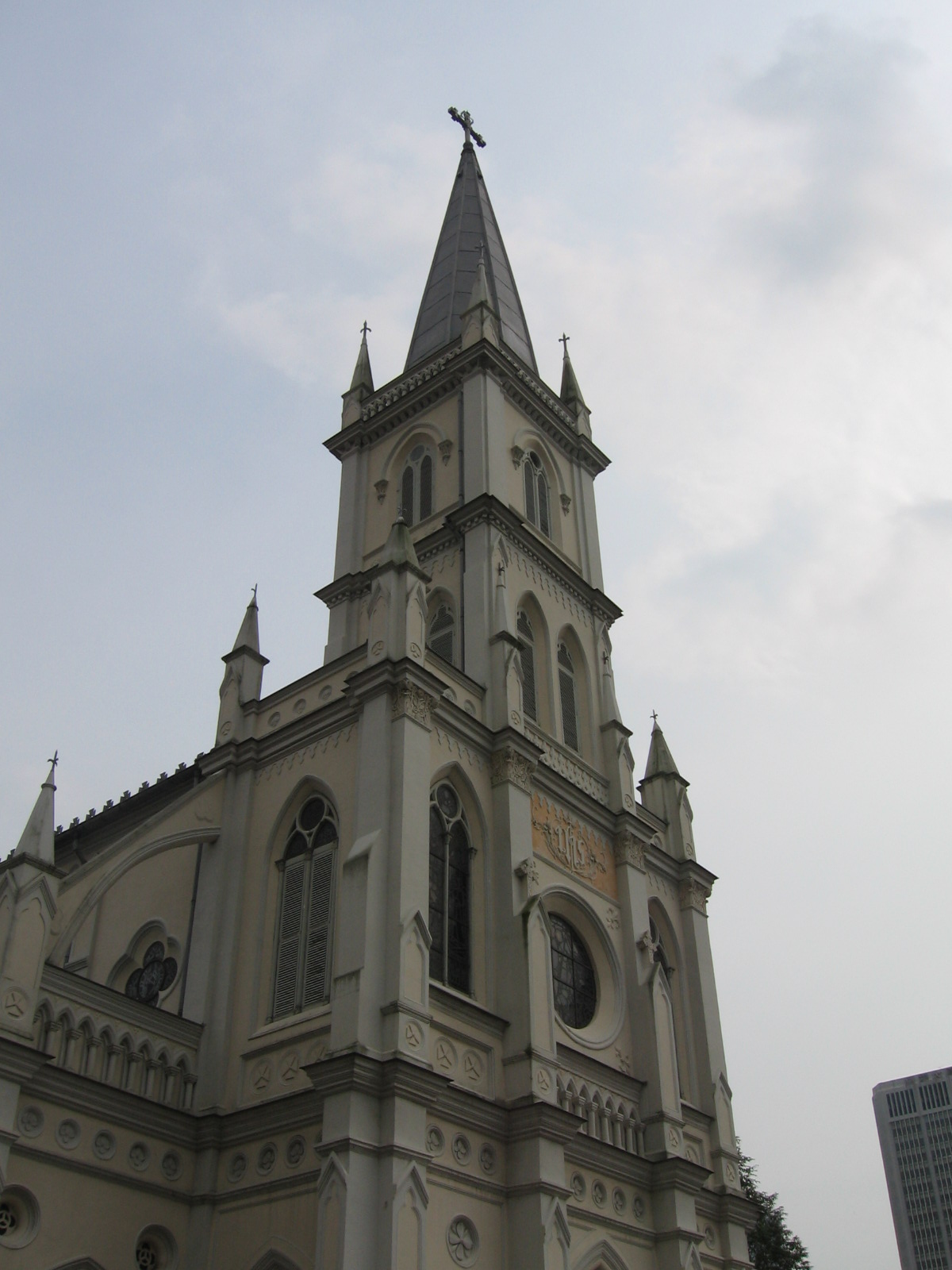

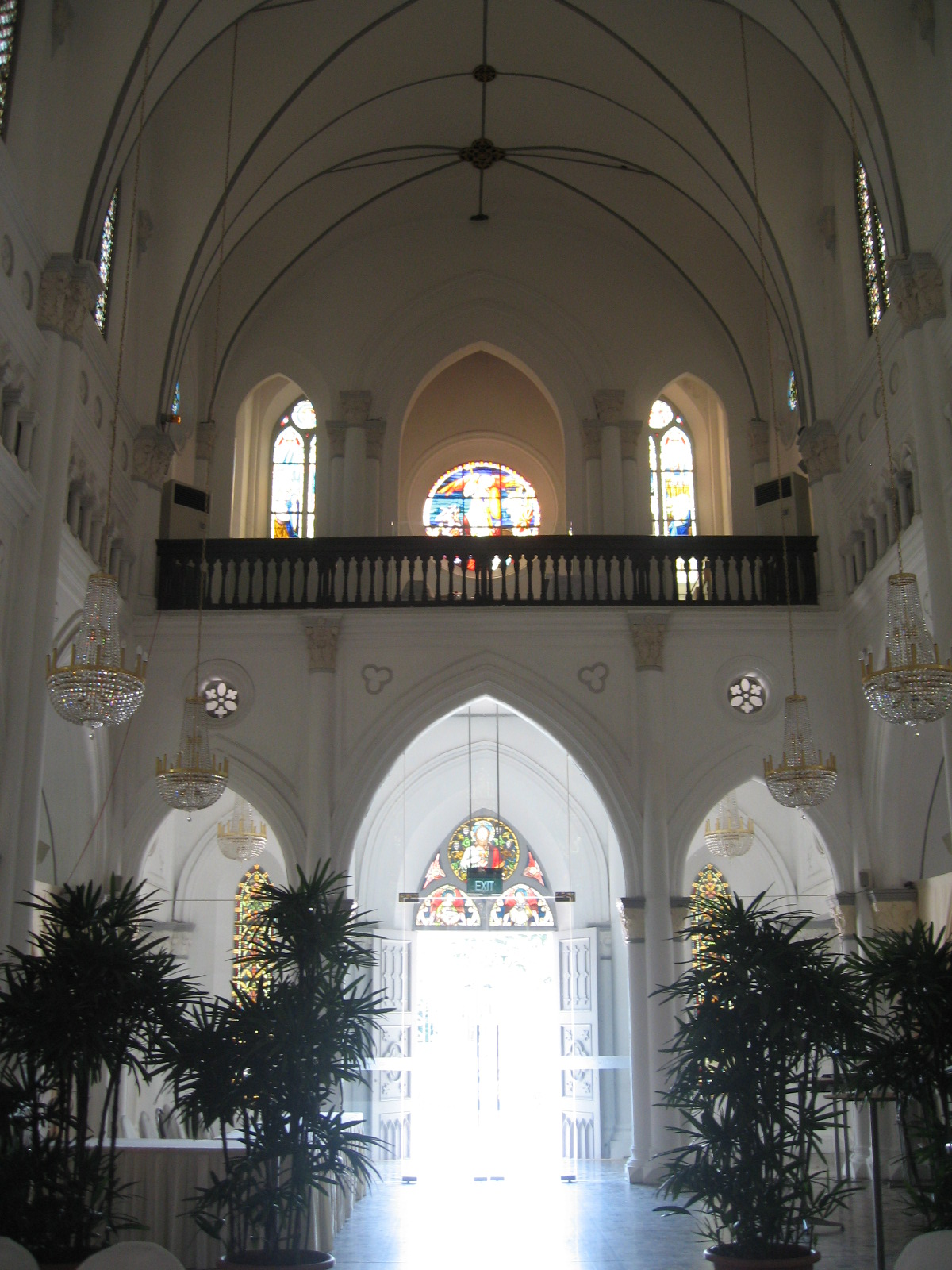

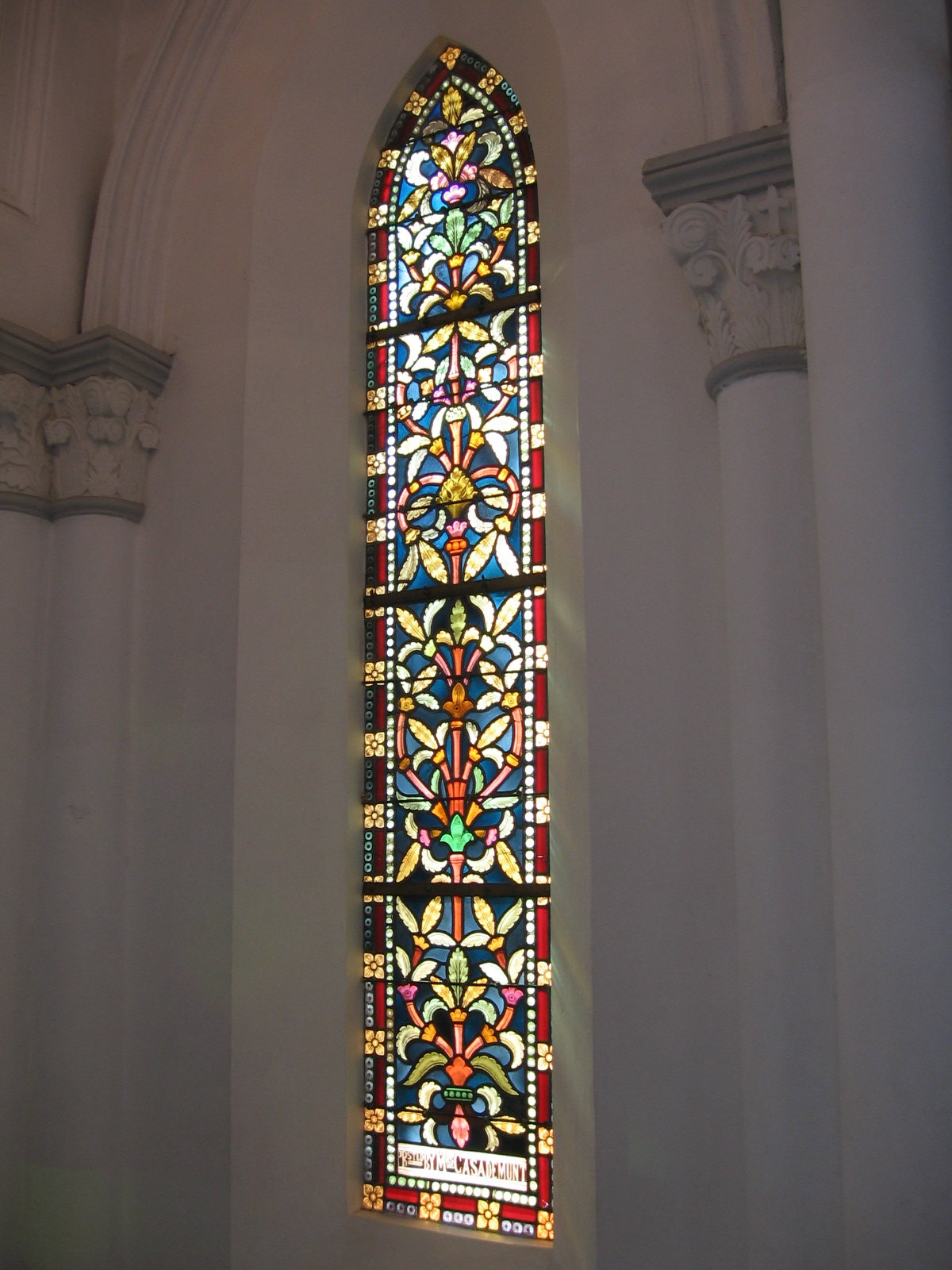

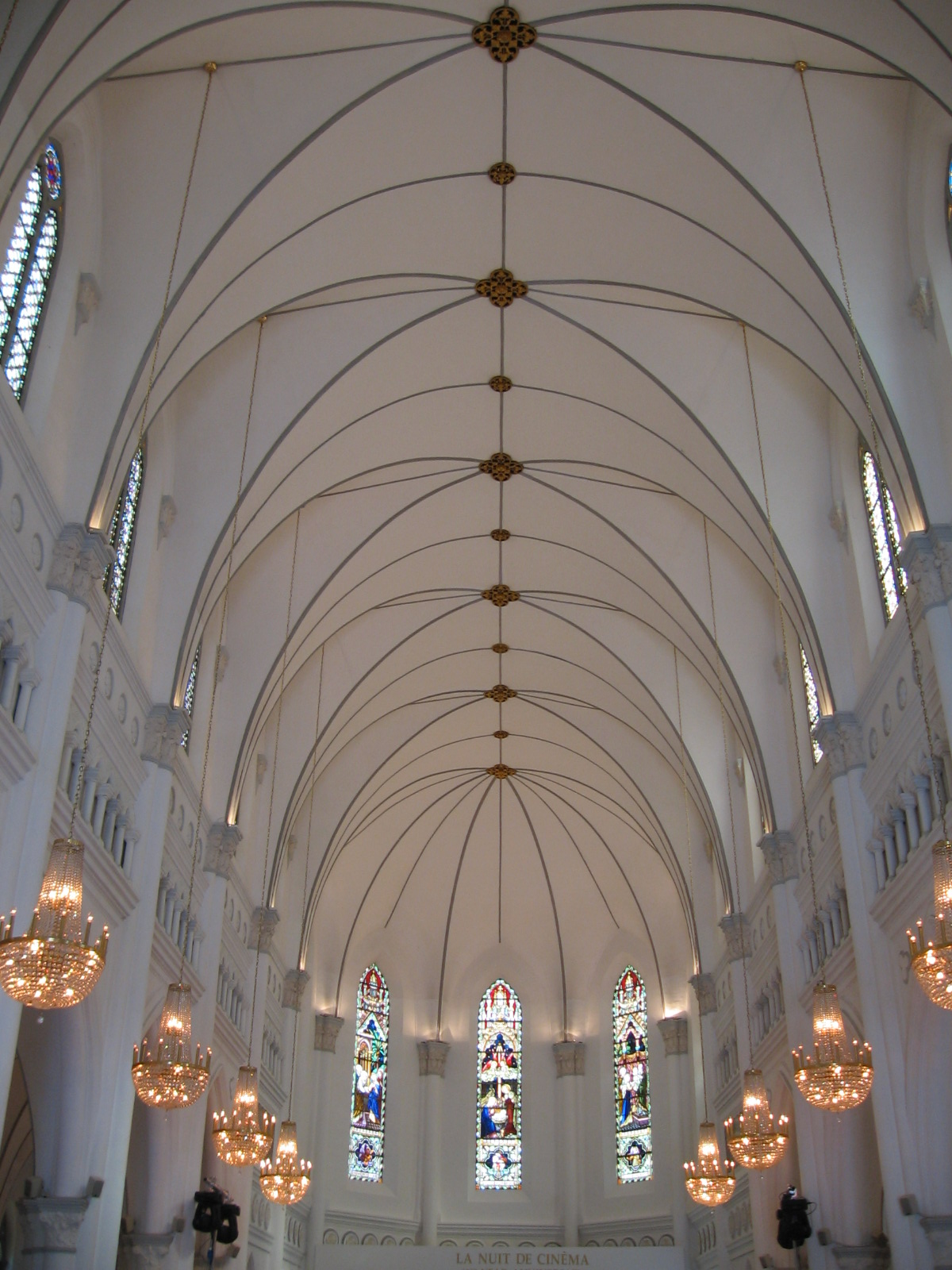

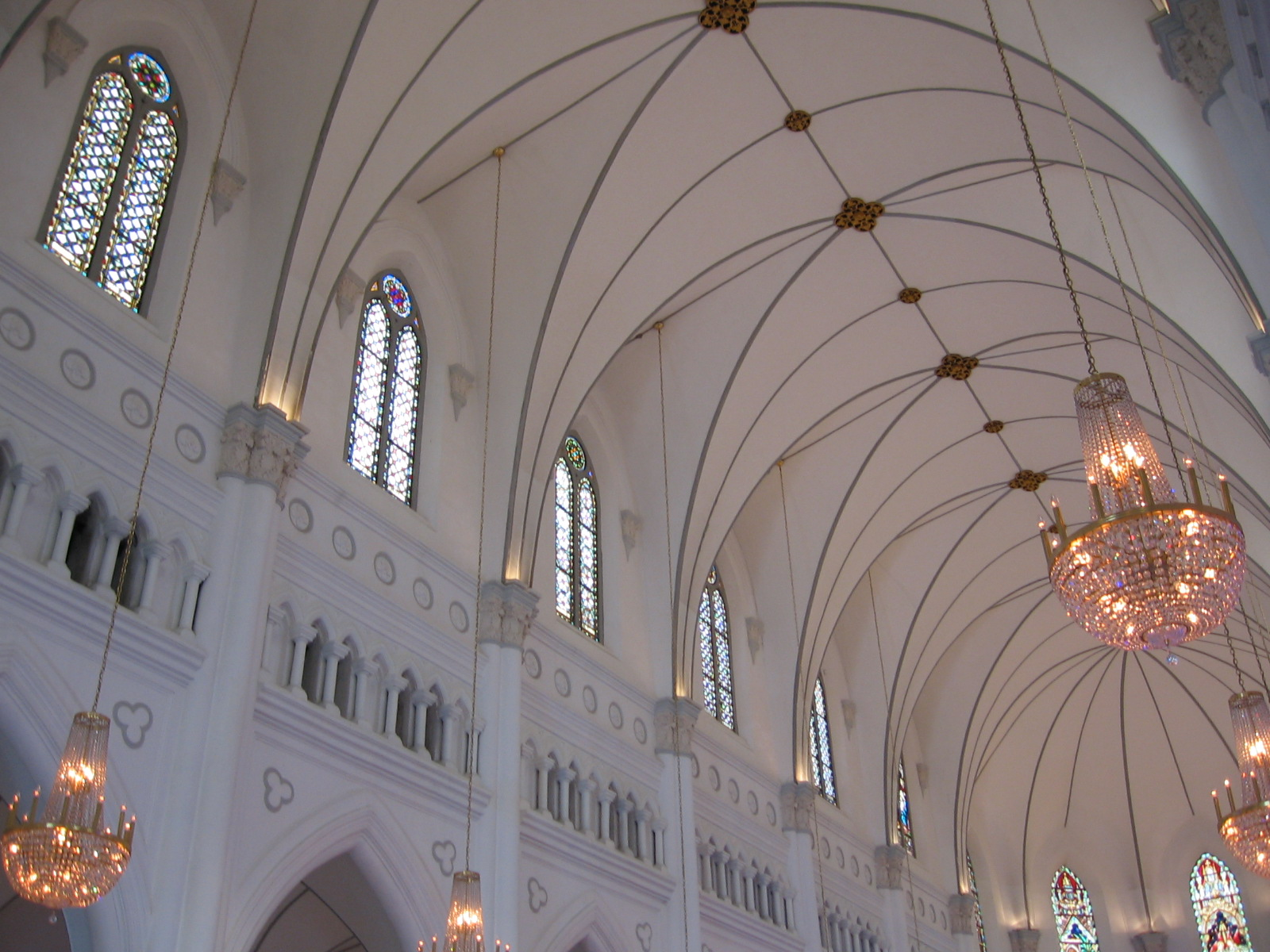

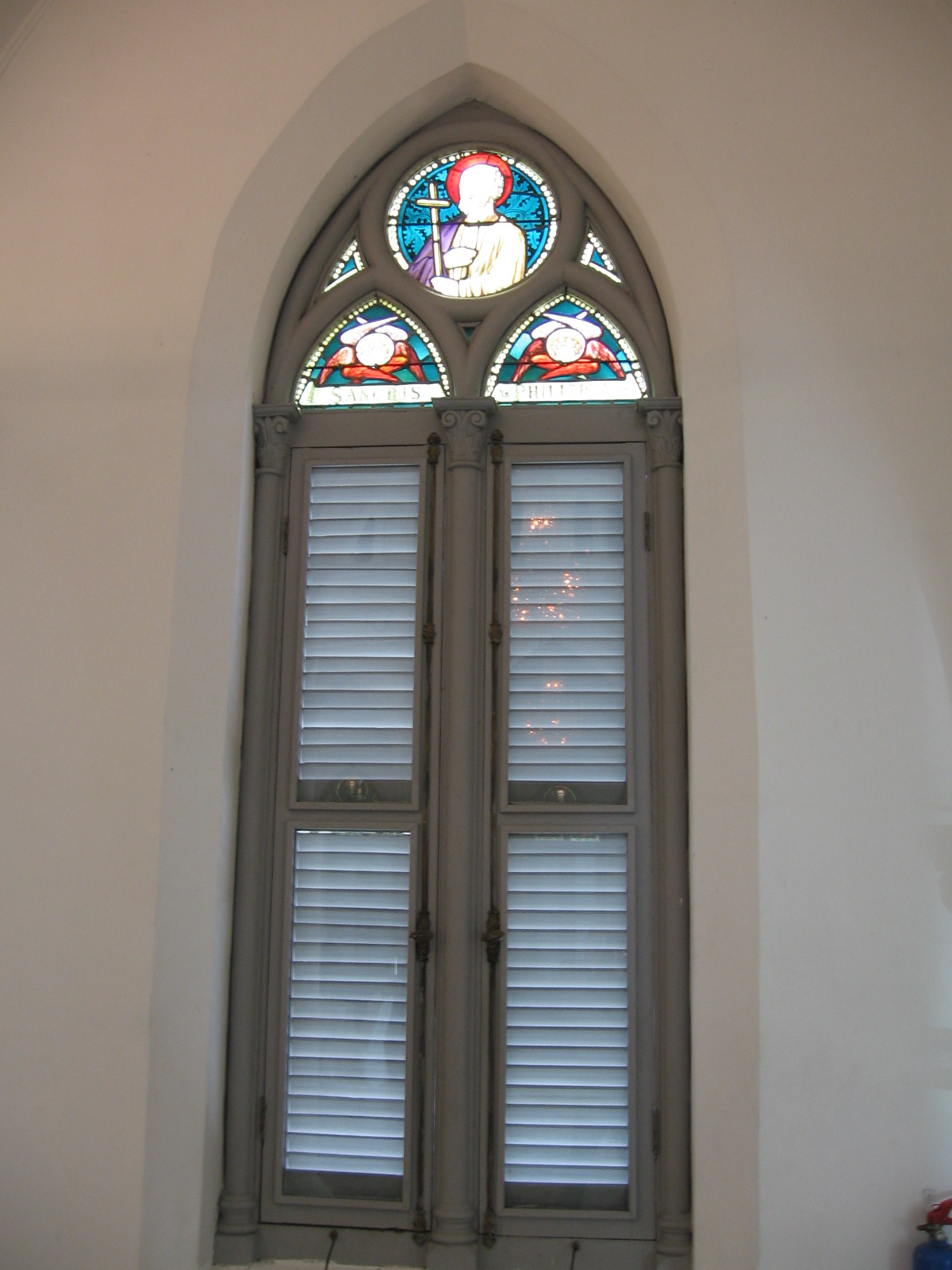

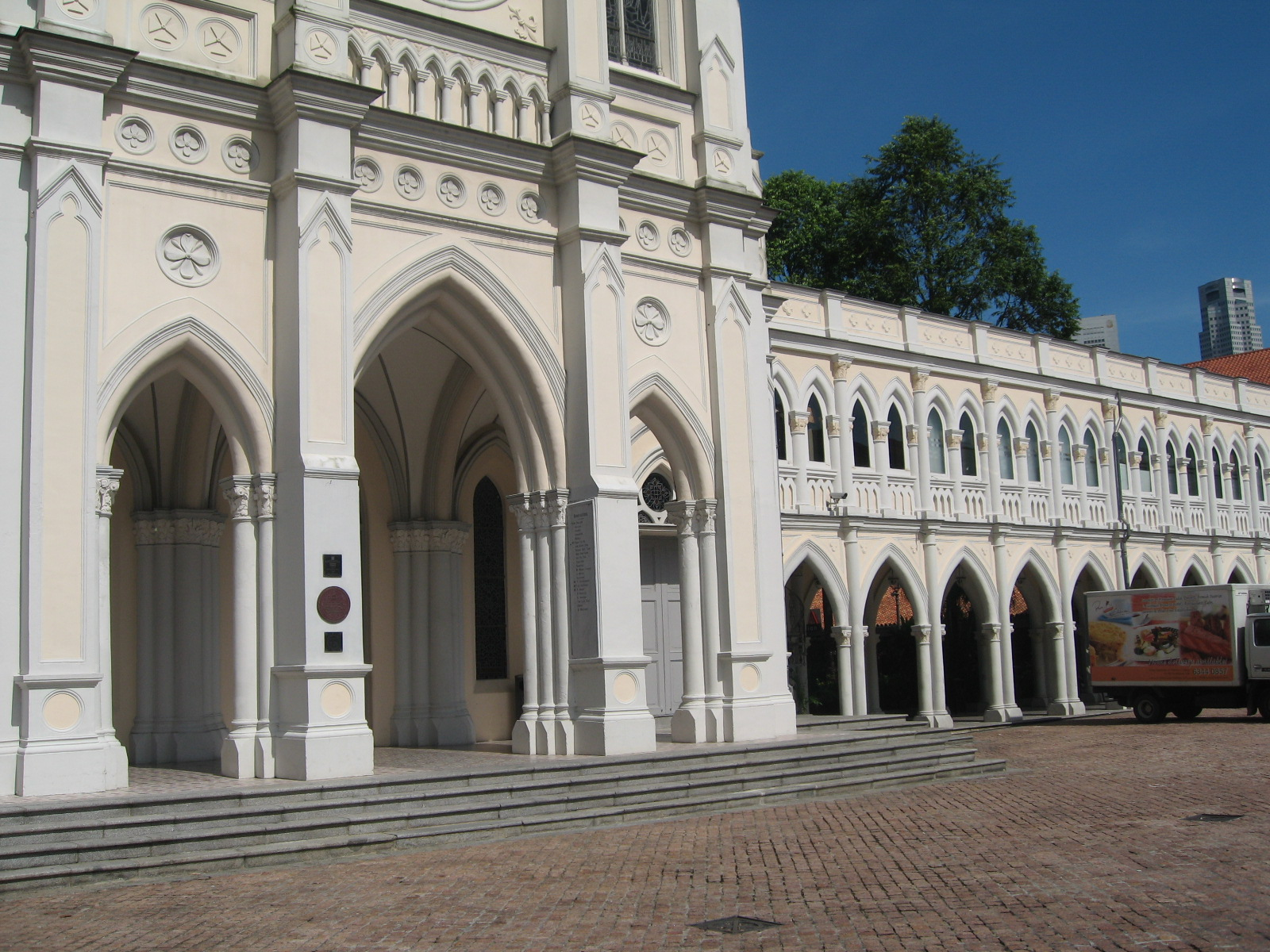

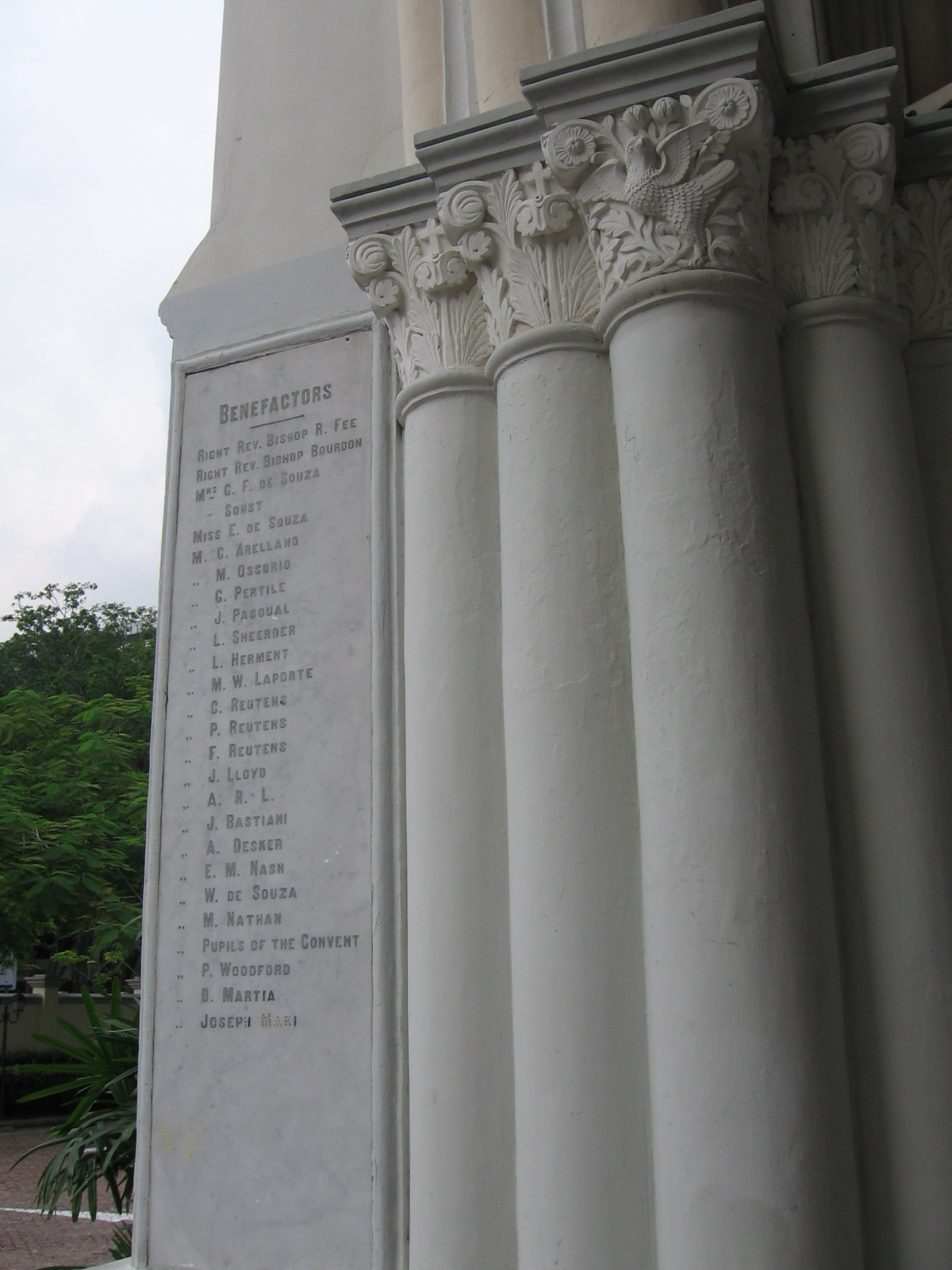

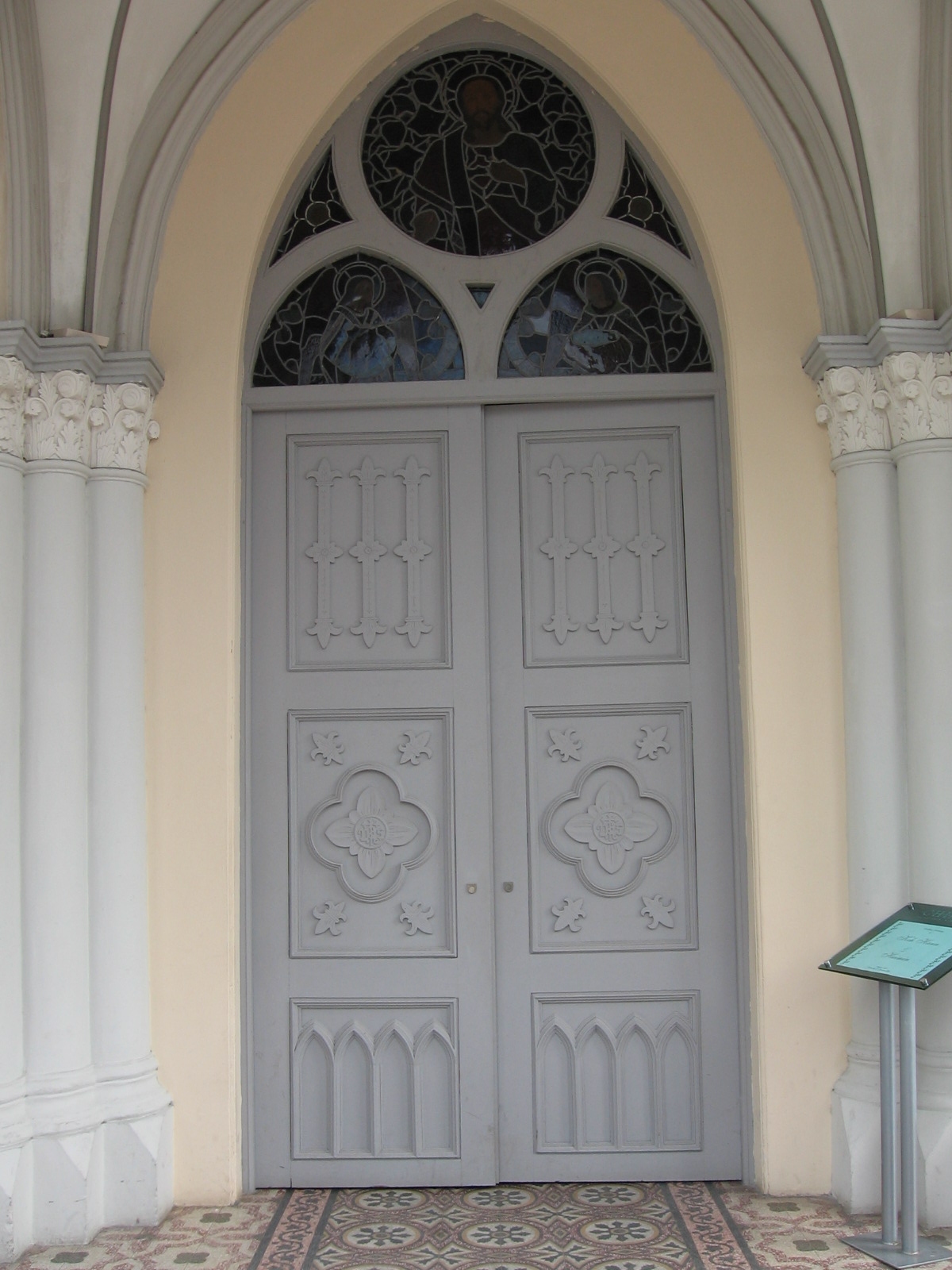

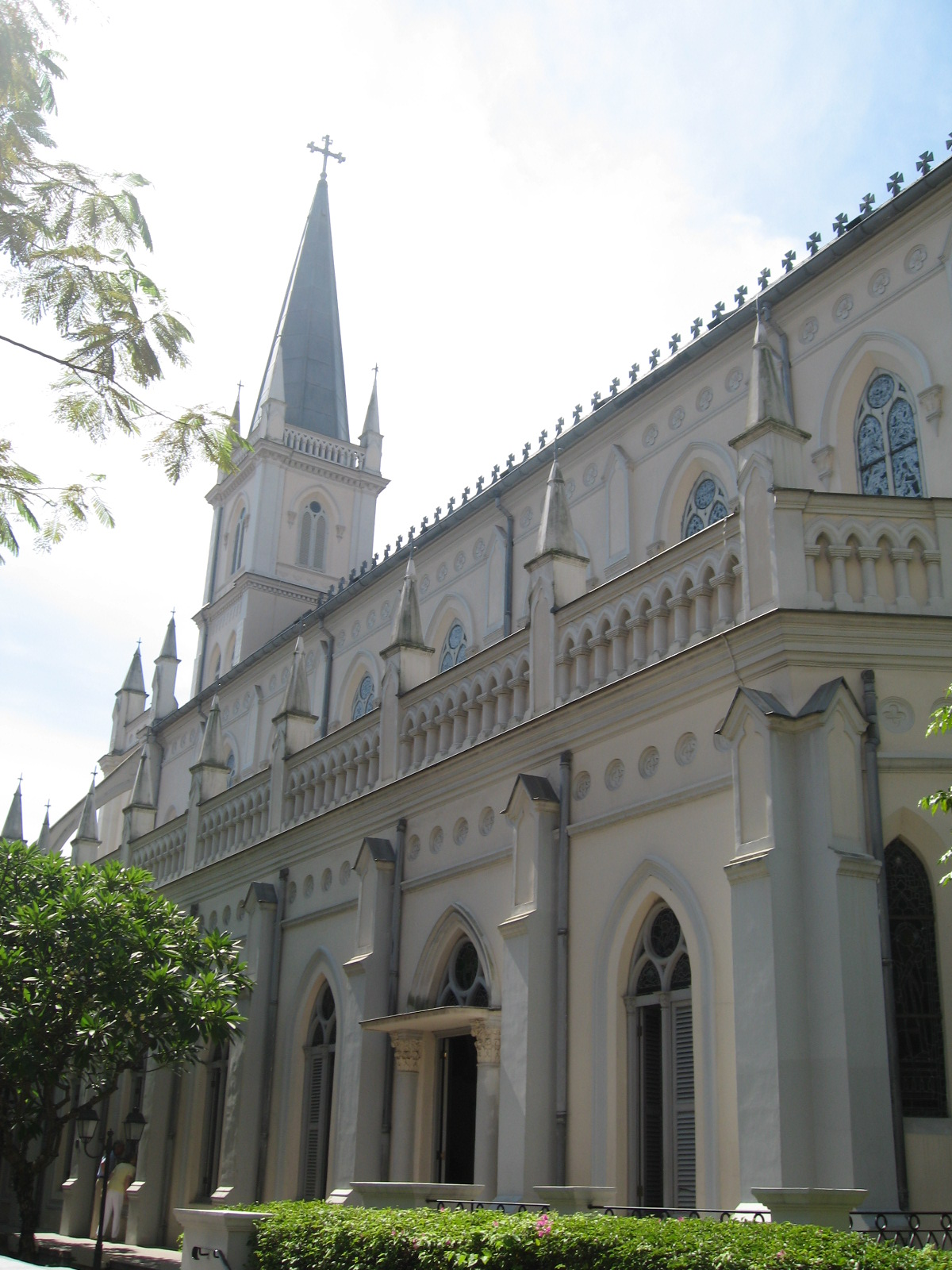

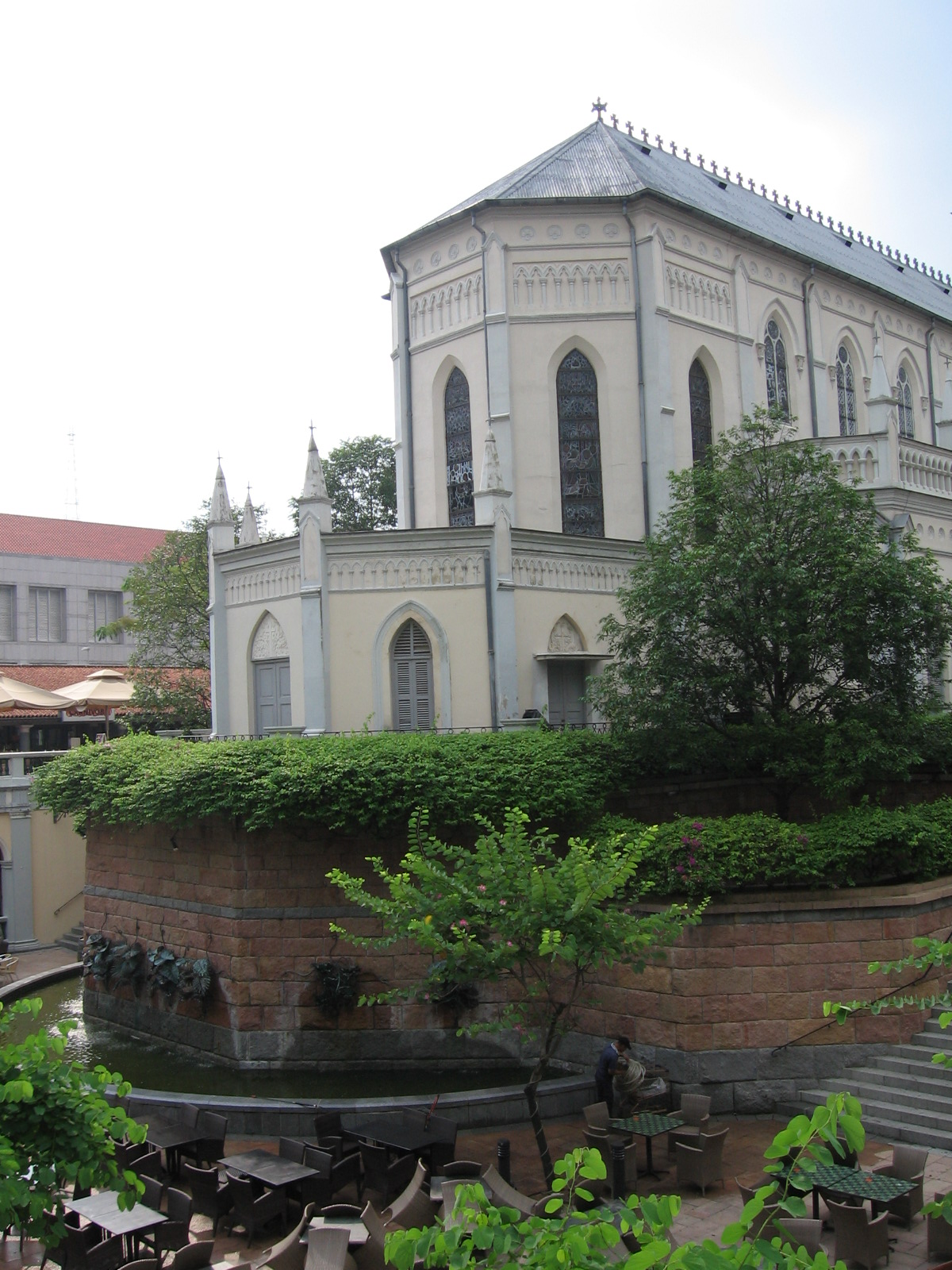

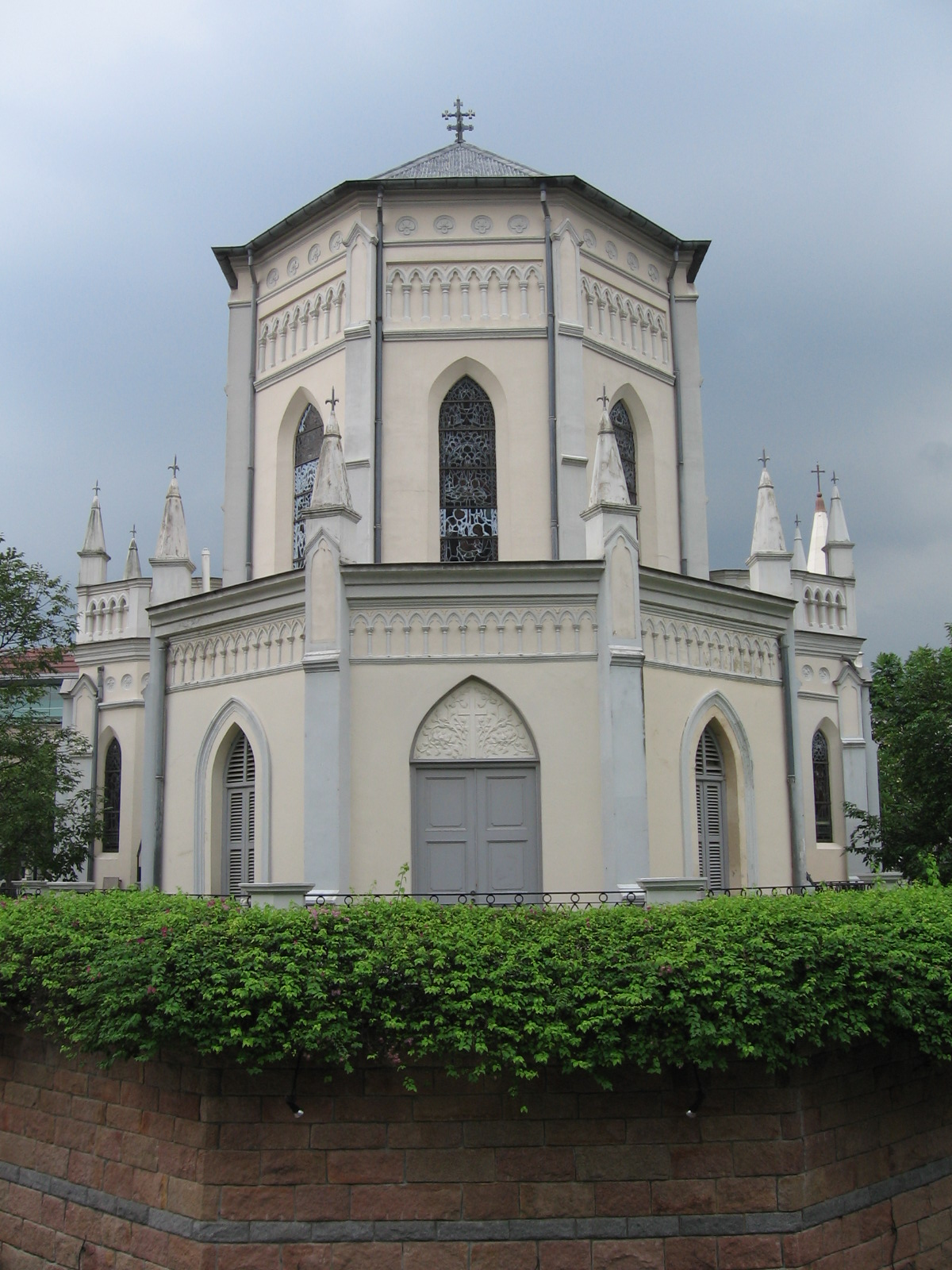

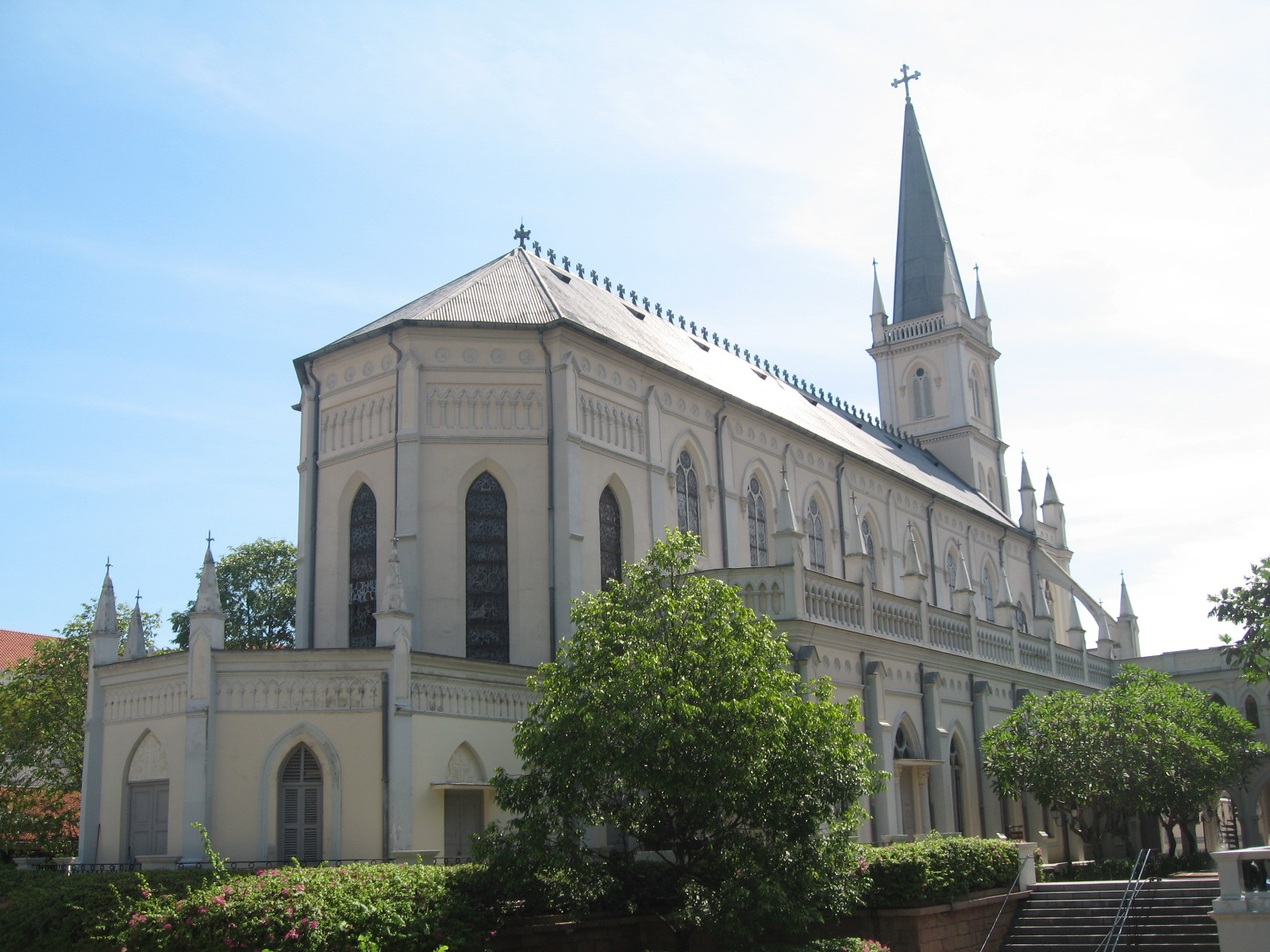

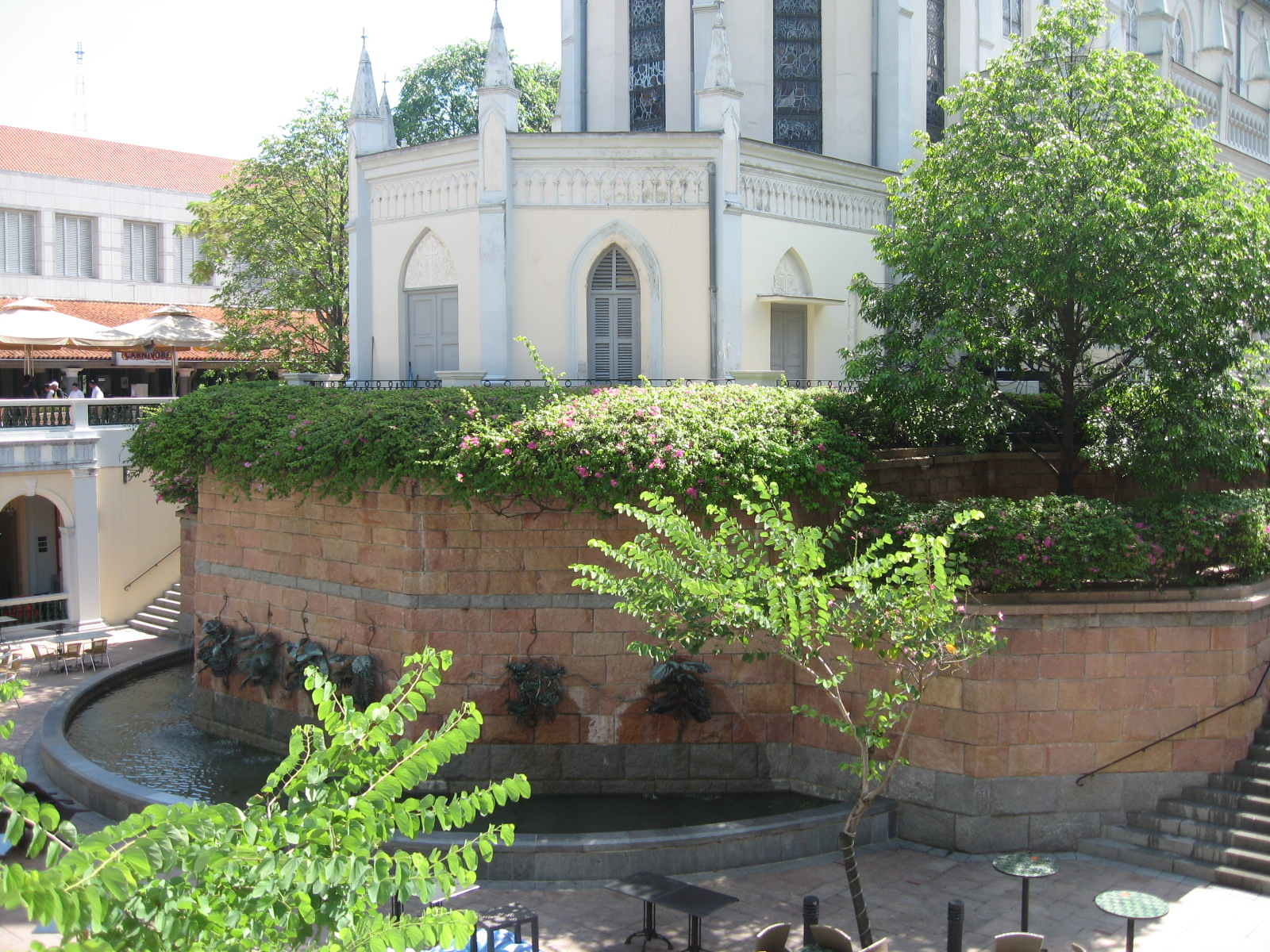
The fountain court showing the former fountain

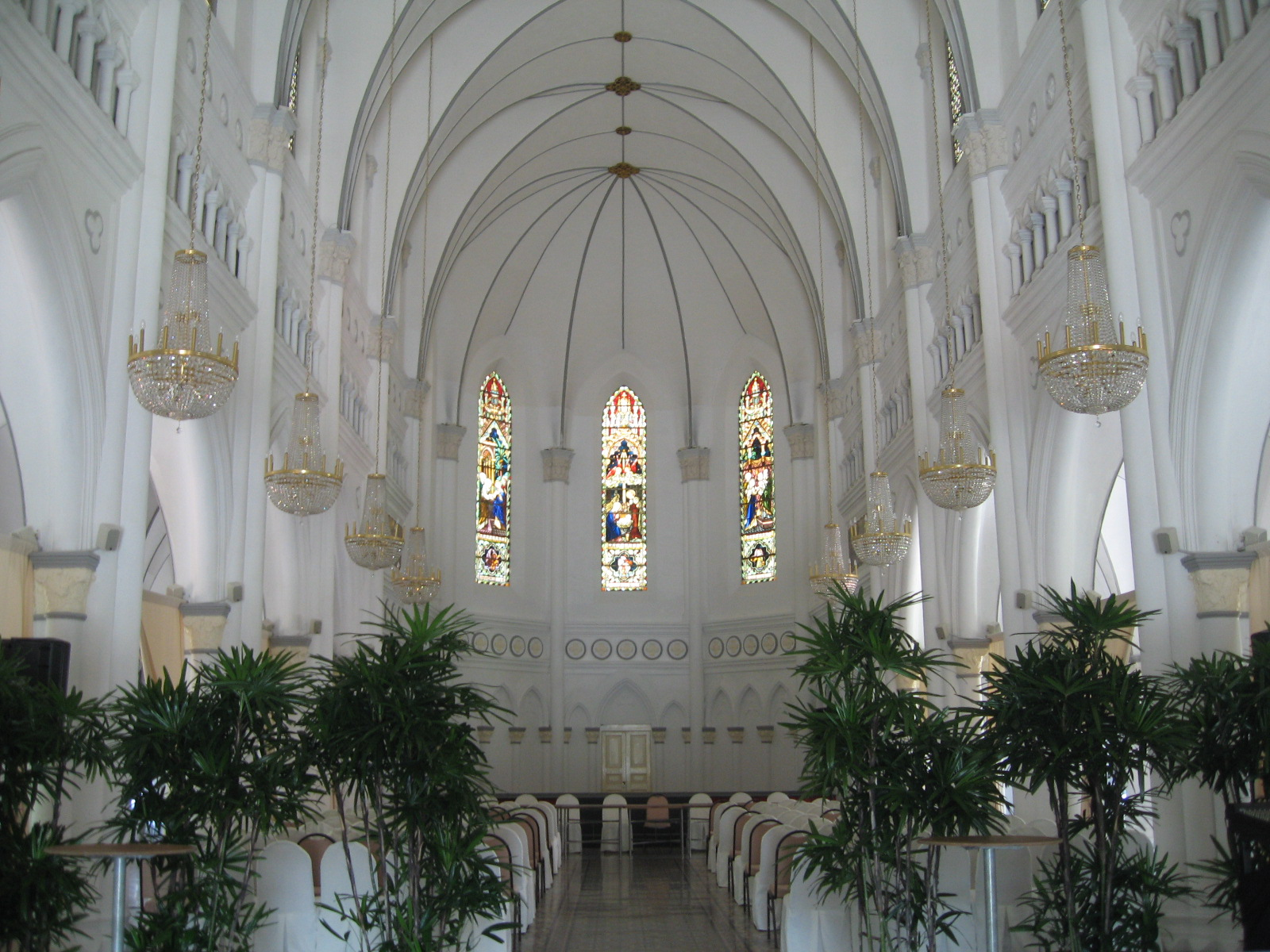

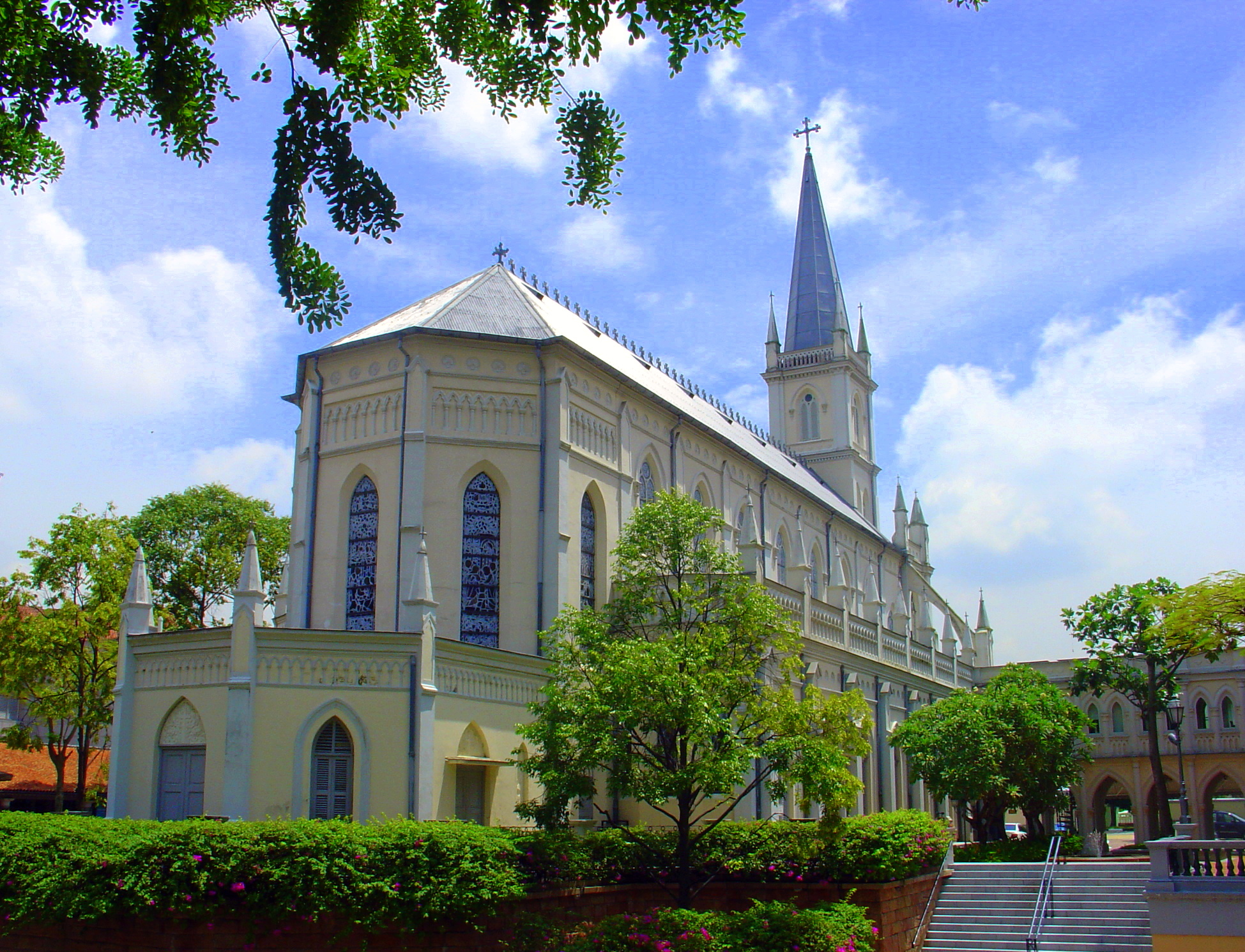

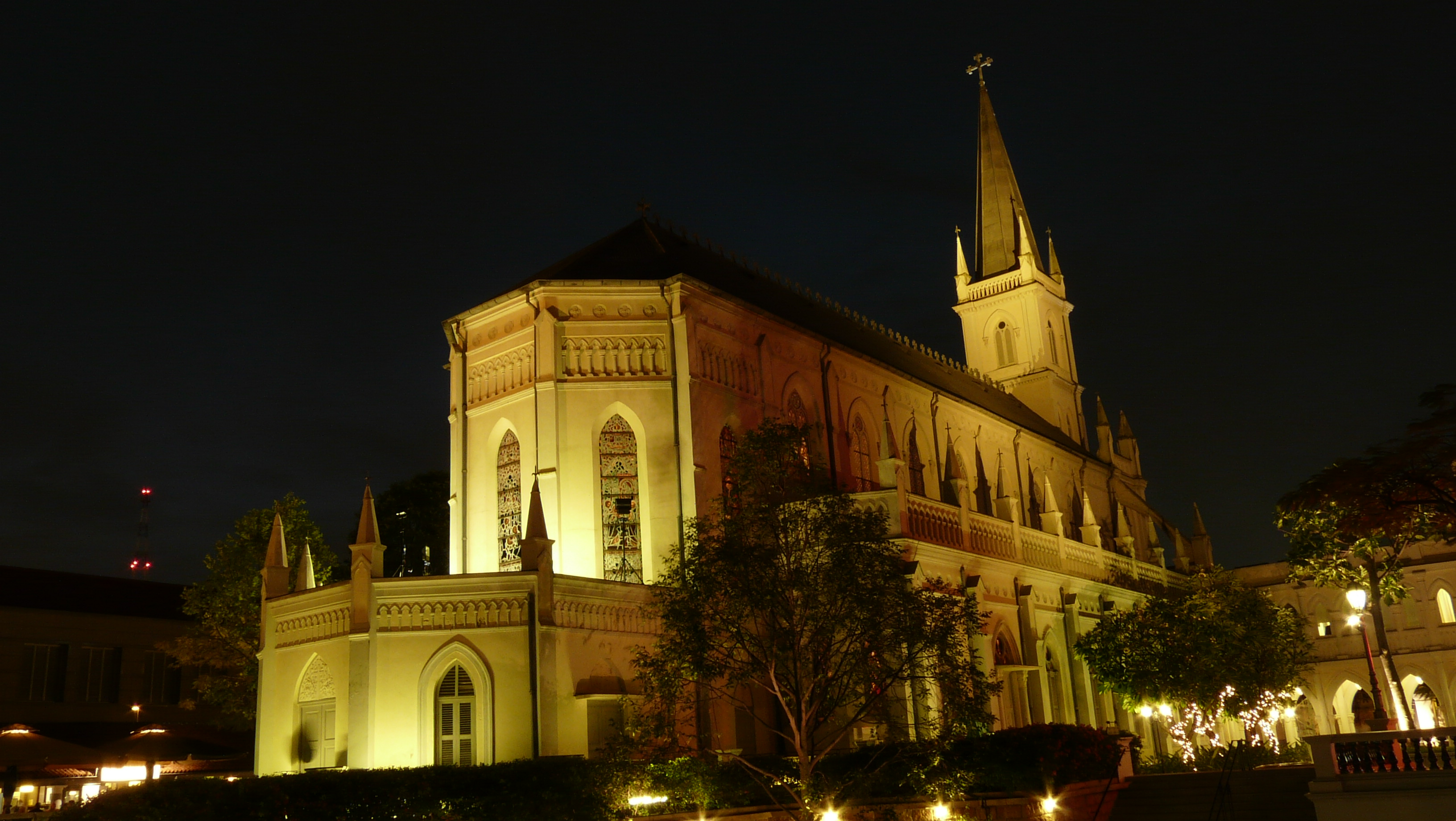

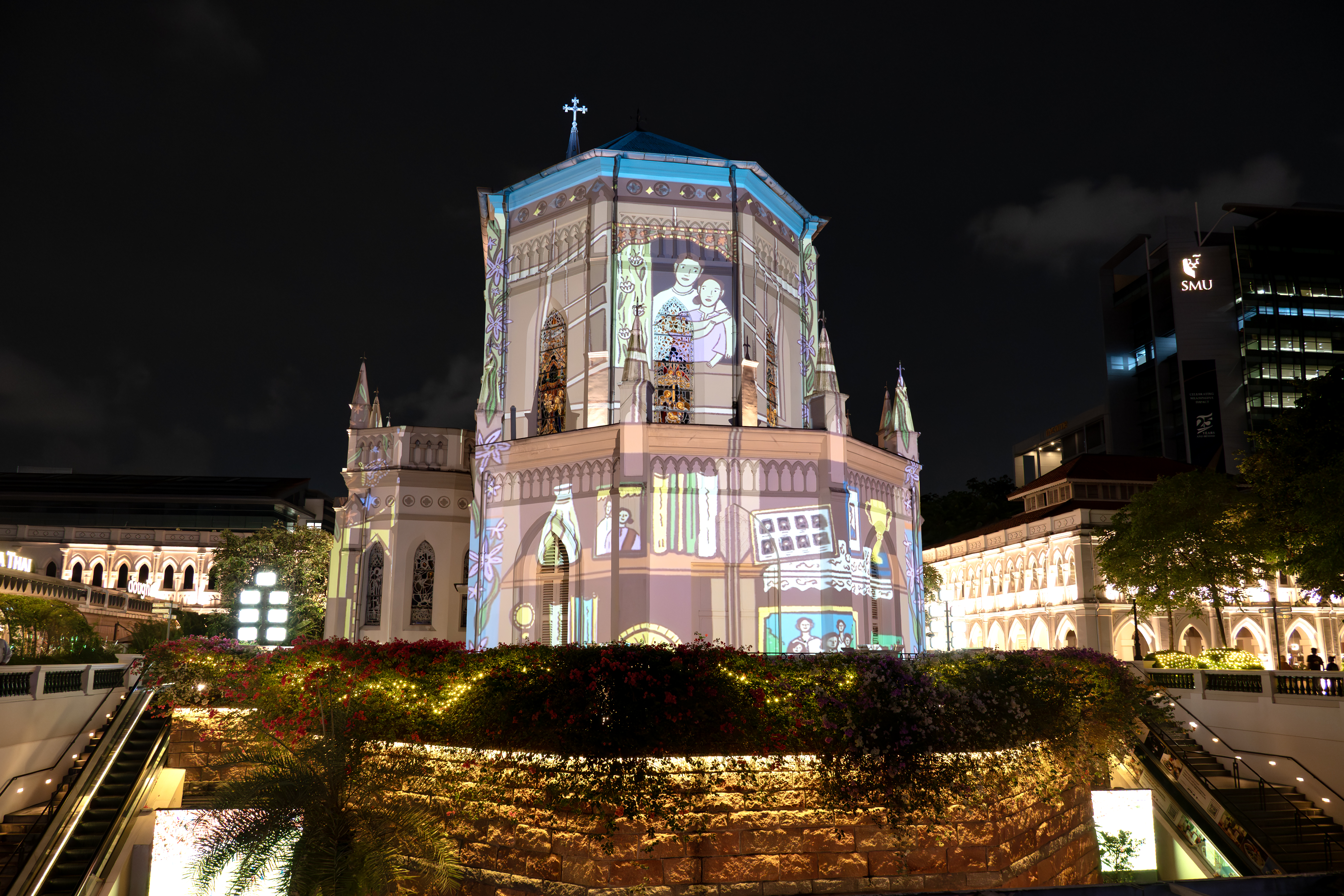
Projection mapping on CHIJMES Hall during Singapore Night Festival 2025.

== In popular culture ==
The wedding scene in Crazy Rich Asians took place in this former chapel.
