= Redeemer =

Redeemer may refer to:

== Religion ==
- A goel in Judaism
- Redeemer (Christianity), referring to Jesus Christ
- Mahdi, described in Islam as "the Redeemer (of mankind)"
- Redeemer Presbyterian Church (New York City)

== Other organisations ==
- Redeemer Lutheran College, school in Queensland, Australia
- Redeemer Baptist School, school in New South Wales, Australia
- Redeemers, Southern U.S. political coalition that overthrew Reconstruction in the 1870s

== Fiction ==
=== Comics ===
- The Redeemer (Black Library comic), a Warhammer 40k comic published by Games Workshop
- The Redeemer (Image Comics), a character from the Spawn comics
- Redeemer (comics), Redeemer is a codename used by two minor characters in Marvel Comics—both are connected to the Hulk
- Redeemers (comics), a Marvel Comics team connected to the Thunderbolts
- Redeemer, a Wildstorm character and member of the Paladins who appeared in Number of the Beast
- America Redeemers (also known as the Redeemers), a Marvel Comics team from Earth-712 who opposed the Squadron Supreme
- Darkhold Redeemers, a Marvel Comics team concerned with the supernatural book the Darkhold
- Elektra and Wolverine: The Redeemer, a series of graphic novels

=== Other fiction ===
- Redeemer (2004 film), a 2004 Brazilian film
- Redeemer (2014 film), a 2014 Chilean action film
- Hunter: The Reckoning – Redeemer, a 2003 video game
- Redeemer (video game), 2017

== Music ==
- Redeemer (Wheat Chiefs album), 1996
- Redeemer (Machinae Supremacy album), 2006
- Redeemer (Norma Jean album), 2006
- Redeemer (D'espairsRay album), 2007

=== Songs ===
- "Redeemer" a song written by Nicole C. Mullen in 2000
- "Redeemer", a song written by Jonathan Davis of Korn, performed by Marilyn Manson on the Queen of the Damned soundtrack
- "Redeemer", a song by Kutless from their 2009 album It Is Well

== See also ==
- The Redeemer (disambiguation)
- Christ the Redeemer (disambiguation), various meanings
- Church of the Redeemer (disambiguation), multiple organisations
