= Episcopal Church of the Redeemer =

Episcopal Church of the Redeemer may refer to:

- Episcopal Church of the Redeemer (Avon Park, Florida)
- Episcopal Church of the Redeemer (Cannon Falls, Minnesota)
- Episcopal Church of the Redeemer (Salmon, Idaho)
- Church of the Redeemer, Amman, Jordan

== See also ==
- Church of the Redeemer (disambiguation)
