= Charles Bénédict Nain =

French Catholic missionary (1870–1916)

Charles Bénédict Nain (5 May 1870 – 28 June 1916) was a Catholic missionary, priest and architect active in Penang, Seremban and Singapore. He designed the Church of the Nativity of the Blessed Virgin Mary, the Convent of the Holy Infant Jesus Chapel and the Saint Joseph's Institution extension, all of which have since been designated National monuments of Singapore.

== Early life and education ==
Nain was born in Farges-lès-Mâcon, France on 5 May 1870. According to historian Soon-Tzu Speechley, the "quality" of his draughtsmanship indicates that he was trained in architecture and it "seems likely that Nain studied at an architectural atelier in France, giving him the necessary skills required to design the sophisticated buildings he created for the Catholic Church in Singapore." Nain was listed as an "architect by training" by the convent. Nain was ordained a priest on 22 September 1894 and left for the Diocese of Malacca on 21 November.

== Career ==
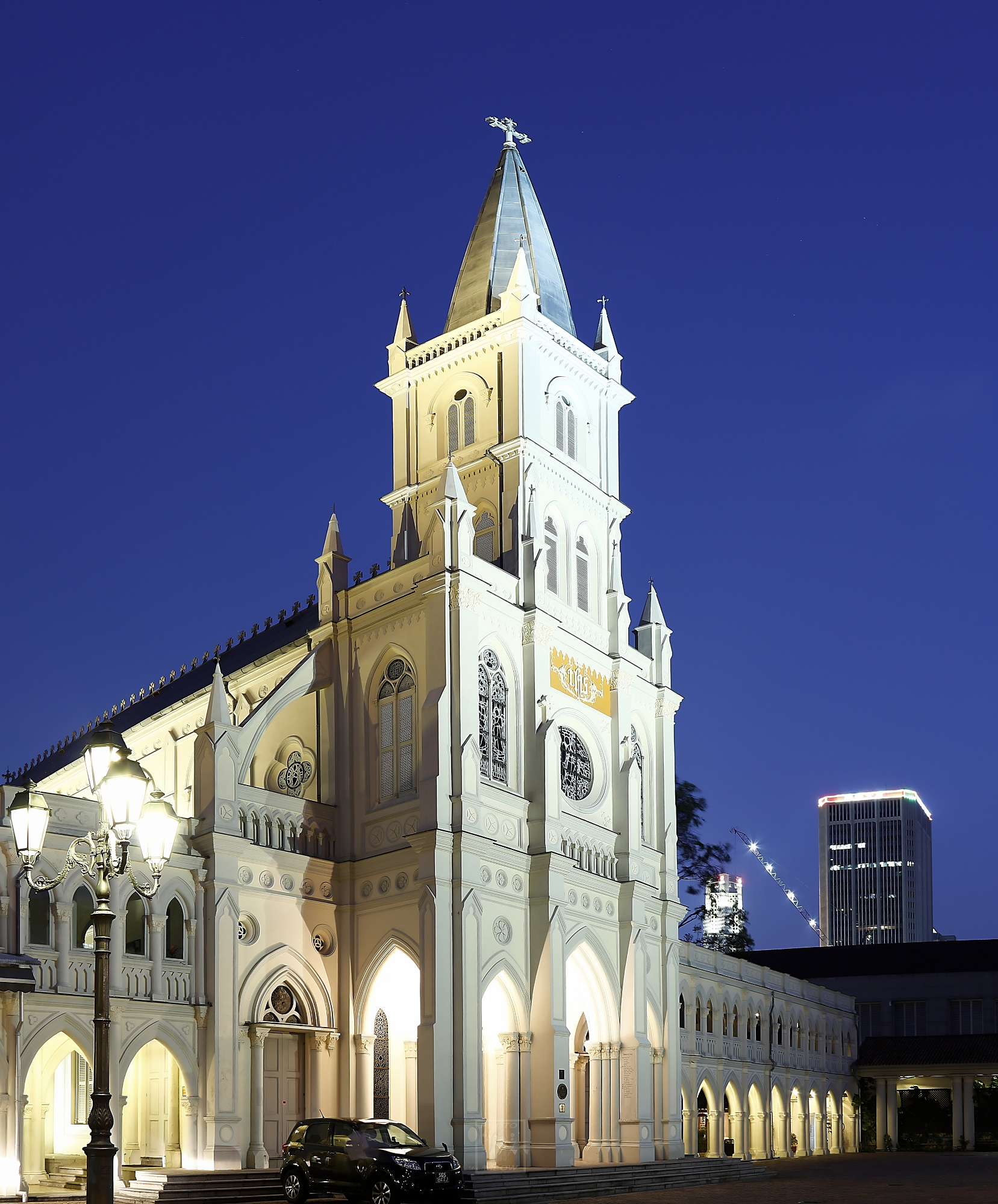
The Convent of the Holy Infant Jesus Chapel.

Nain arrived in Southeast Asia in December 1894. He was first assigned to the Church of Saints Peter and Paul in Singapore, then within the Malaccan diocese, under Father Alphonse Vignol. While there, he learnt to speak Hokkien. In 1896, he was assigned to the Church of Our Lady of Sorrows in Penang. Two years later, Bishop René Michel Marie Fée asked him to return to Singapore to serve as the vicar of the Cathedral of the Good Shepherd. By then, he had learnt to speak Teochew Min and Hakka Chinese. Nain was paid by Father Casimir-Jean Saleilles, the parish priest of the Church of the Nativity of the Blessed Virgin Mary in Serangoon, to design a new church for his congregation. The church was consecrated on 8 December 1901 and was later designated a National monument of Singapore. His next work was the Convent of the Holy Infant Jesus Chapel on Victoria Street, which was completed in 1904. Designed in the Gothic Revival style, the chapel was "no doubt inspired by the churches of Mâcon and Fontaine, located close to his birthplace." The chapel, which currently known as CHIJMES Hall, following the convent's departure and subsequent deconsecration, was one of two buildings within the CHIJMES complex to be designated a National monument of Singapore in 1990.

In 1900, Nain was approached by Michael Noctor, then the director of the St. Joseph's Institution to design an extension for the school. The extension, completed in 1903, included two curved wings and a "silvery dome". The extension gave the school a "baroque appearance" and a "resemblance to Saint Peter's in Rome. The newly extended building was hailed as "one of the most beautiful buildings in the East at that time." It was designated a national monument in 1992. In 1904, Nain was assigned to Seremban. While there, he worked on the St. Paul's Institution. He returned to France for two years in 1907. While on leave, he established a branch of the Convent of the Holy Infant Jesus for the training of Irish nuns who were to leave for British Malaya. Nain returned to Singapore in 1909 and was appointed the priest of the Cathedral of the Good Shepherd, a role which he held until 1913. He succeeded Father Henri-Pierre Rivet in this position. He designed and built a new presbytery. In 1912, he began raising funds for a Bevington & Sons pipe organ, which arrived the following year. It remains the oldest pipe organ in Singapore and possibly in Southeast Asia. He was also responsible for installing electric lights and fans in the cathedral. In this period, Nain designed a holiday home for the Brothers of the Christian Schools in Singapore in Katong. This later became Saint Patrick's School.

== Personal life and death ==
Nain returned to France in 1913 seeking treatment for a "bad attack of the sprue." By then, his health "had been failing for some time." However, World War I broke out the following year and Nain enlisted in the military as a nurse. He then "fell dangerously ill with a serious heart condition", which led to his death at the military hospital in Vichy on 28 June 1916. He was buried at the Cemetery of Farges-lès-Mâcon. His name is listed on The Cenotaph.
