= The Redeemer =

The Redeemer may refer to:

- The Redeemer (novel), a crime novel by Jo Nesbø
- The Redeemer (album), a 2013 studio album by Dean Blunt
- The Redeemer (film), an American horror film
- The Redeemer (Black Library comic), a 2002 comic mini-series by Warhammer Monthly
- The Redeemer (Image Comics), a character of the Spawn comic book series published by Image Comics

== See also ==
- Redeemer (disambiguation)
