= Former Saint Joseph's Institution =

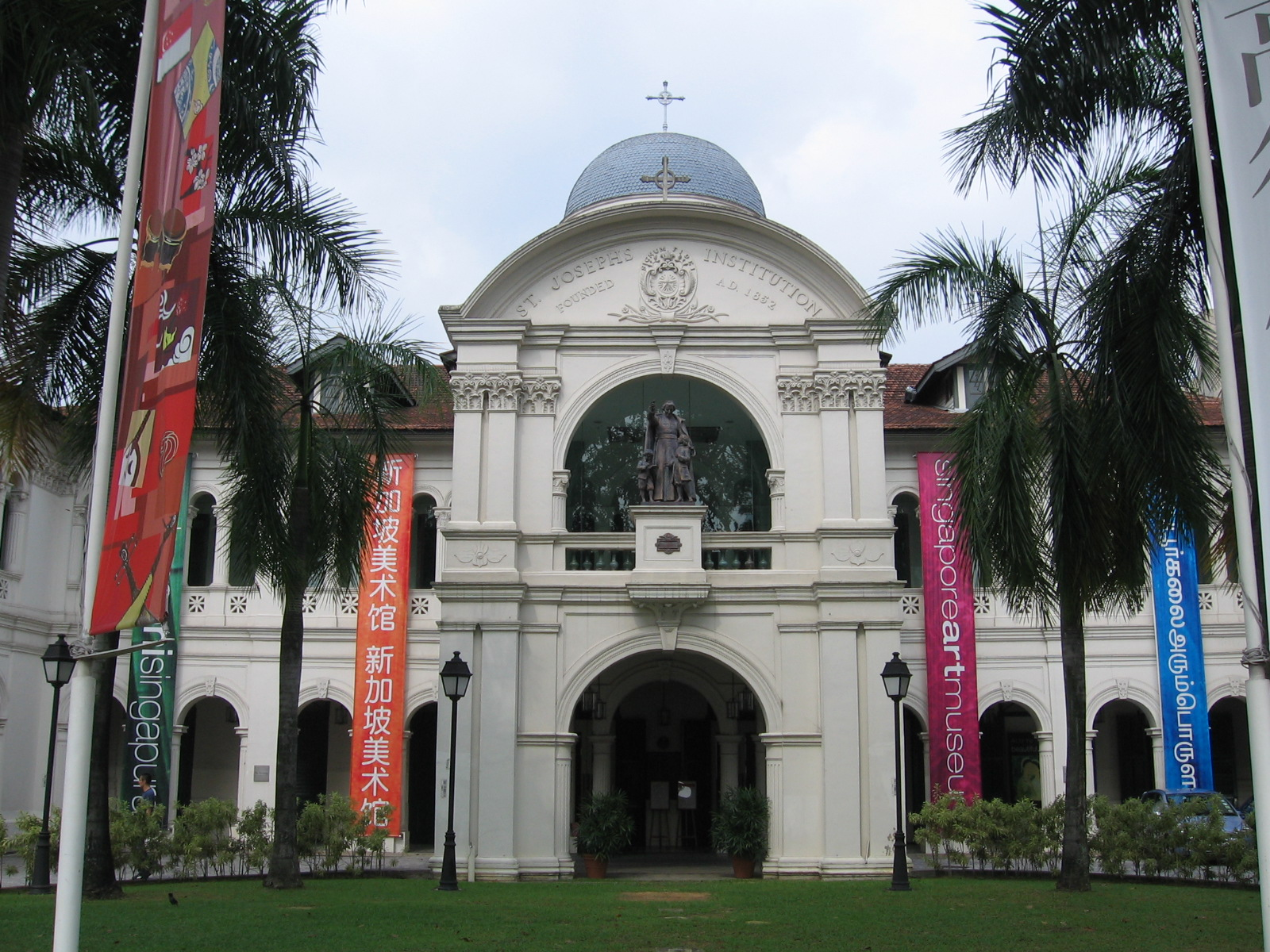
- The former Saint Joseph's Institution housed the Singapore Art Museum from 1996 to 2017

- Location within Singapore
- 1°17′50.3″N 103°51′03.6″E
- Location: 71 Bras Basah Road

History
- Built: 1867

Site notes
- Governing body: National Heritage Board

National monument of Singapore
- Designated: 14 February 1992; 34 years ago
- Reference no.: 31

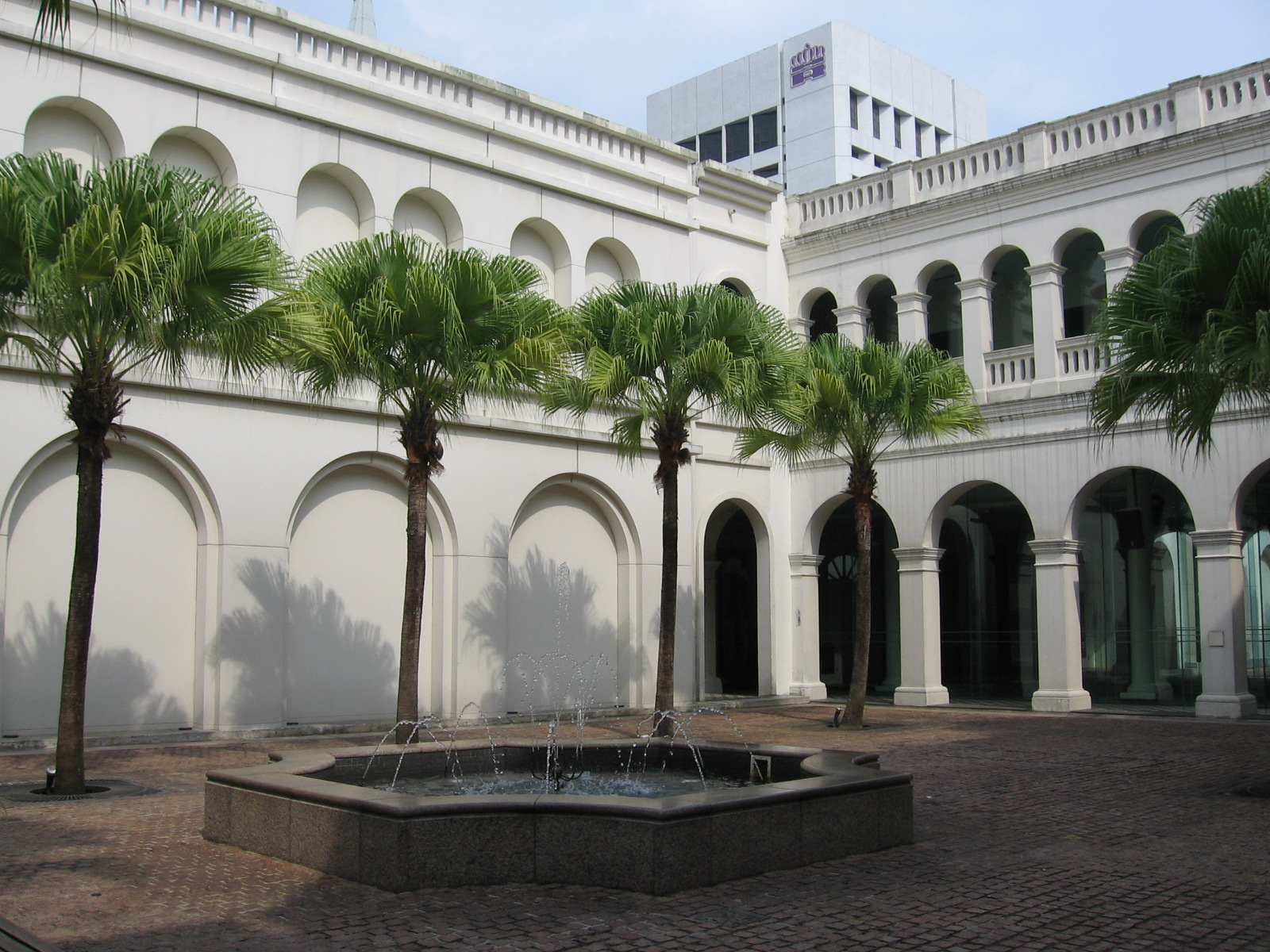
A courtyard within the grounds of the former Saint Joseph's Institution.

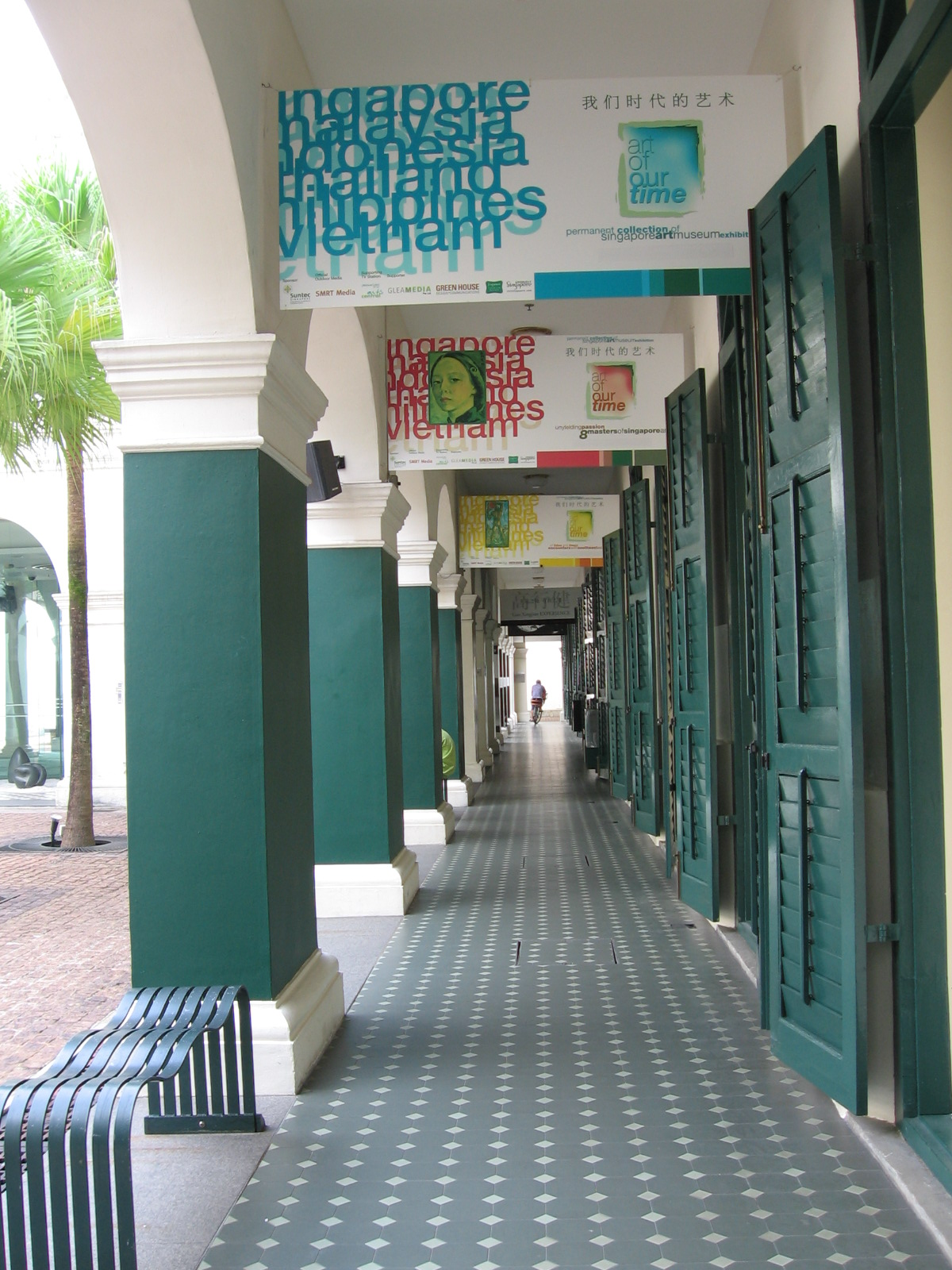
One of the long verandahs at the rear of the building.

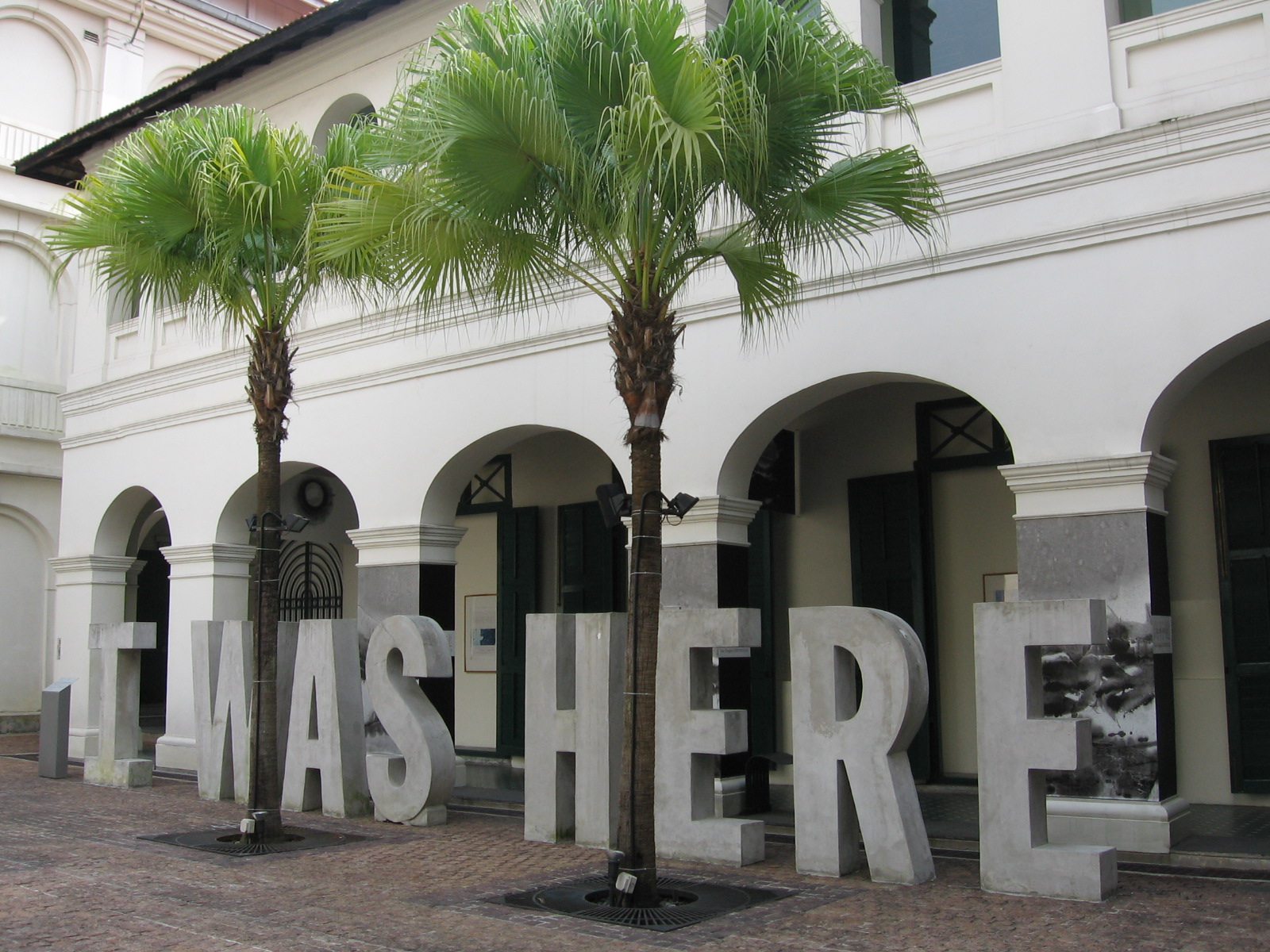
A stone sculpture artwork on display at the former Singapore Art Museum.

The former Saint Joseph's Institution (Chinese: 前圣约瑟书院) is a historic building in Singapore, located at Bras Basah Road in the Museum Planning Area, within the Central Area. The building previously housed the Lasallian school Saint Joseph's Institution. It came into disuse after St. Joseph's Institution moved into a new campus on Malcolm Road in 1988. The building was restored and housed the Singapore Art Museum from 1996 to 2017. The building is currently being studied for a potential Singapore Design Museum.

== Architecture ==
Built on the site of a small Catholic chapel erected in the 1830s, the first in Singapore, the former Saint Joseph's Institution is another example of the work of a 19th-century French priest-architect, Brother Lothaire. Brother Lothaire was one of six Brothers, five Sisters and two young missionaries who came to Singapore with Reverend Father Jean Marie Beurel on his return from France in 1852 to found the new Catholic boys' school of Saint Joseph's Institution.

When the school was first completed in 1867, the completed building which is the current central block comprised a two-storey rectangular block with a pitched roof and modest belfry.

In 1903-1906, Father Charles Bénédict Nain, the then parish priest, added two new semi-circular wings to match the architectural theme of the central block and to define the fine Baroque entrance forecourt which is such an important part of the urban area in which it stands. This quality has been all but destroyed in recent years.

In 1910, verandahs running along the whole length of the building were added at the rear, a large dome built that replaced the old belfry was lined with teak and the cross was erected. New pediments and a parapet were also added. Brother Michael was responsible for the hall, gymnasium and the chapel, which were added between 1911 and 1912.
