= Deconsecration =

Act of removing a religious blessing

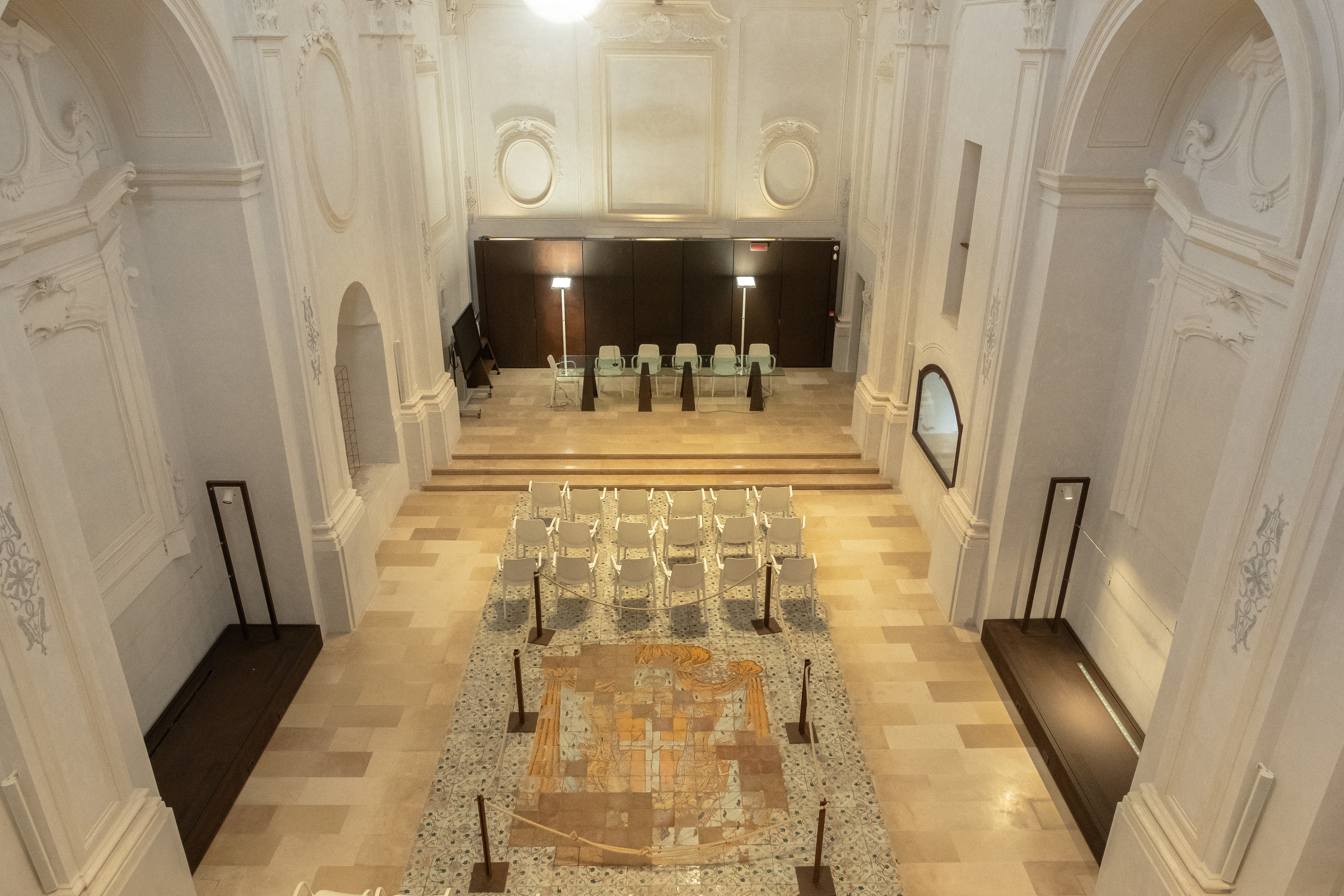
Deconsecrated Church of Saint Philomena in Ugento, Italy, used as a city hall.

Deconsecration, also referred to as decommissioning or secularization (a term also used for the external confiscation of church property), is the removal of a religious sanction and blessing from something that had been previously consecrated for spiritual use. This can be of any particular thing, including people or places, that may have been considered holy or blessed in some way in the past.

In particular, church buildings no longer required for religious use are deconsecrated for secular use or demolition.

== Judaism ==
Jewish legalistic discourse surrounding both abstract and physical objects—such as sacrifices for the Temple in Jerusalem, coinage, and nature— often describes consecration as dependent on the circumstance by which those objects are used. The term "consecration" may be used to describe the neutral, unadulterated, innate state of a thing, where "deconsecration" is a consequence of a particular action that renders that object unfit for certain ceremonial, religious, or moral uses. For instance, silver or coinage circulated under a previous occupying ruler of Palestine, it can be considered deconsecrated for the sake of, e.g., Tzedakah. As is common in virtually all Talmudic discourse, there is dissenting opinion.

=== Synagogues ===
Jewish legalistic tradition generally does not consider synagogues to be holy structures on their own, but rather holy through the congregation or minyan that uses it. Thus, there are no formal procedures for the consecration or deconsecration of a synagogue (Hebrew: בית הכנסת [Beit haKnesset]). This also allows any space habitually used to support a minyan (quorum of ten Jews above the age of bar mitzvah) to be considered a synagogue, as long as it contains a torah ark (Hebrew: ארון קודש [Aron Kodesh]), and bimah or platform from which the Torah can be observed and read. There are provisions, however, concerning what can be done with the building that constituted a synagogue after it has been sold, when a synagogue must be deconstructed, what purpose a building that is be converted into a synagogue may have had immediately prior, to whom a synagogue can be sold, and what can be done with the financial proceeds gained through the sale of a synagogue. For instance, a synagogue may be converted into a hall of learning (such as a Yeshiva), but a hall of learning cannot be converted into a synagogue, as a hall of learning is considered holier than a synagogue.

== Christianity ==
=== Anglicanism ===
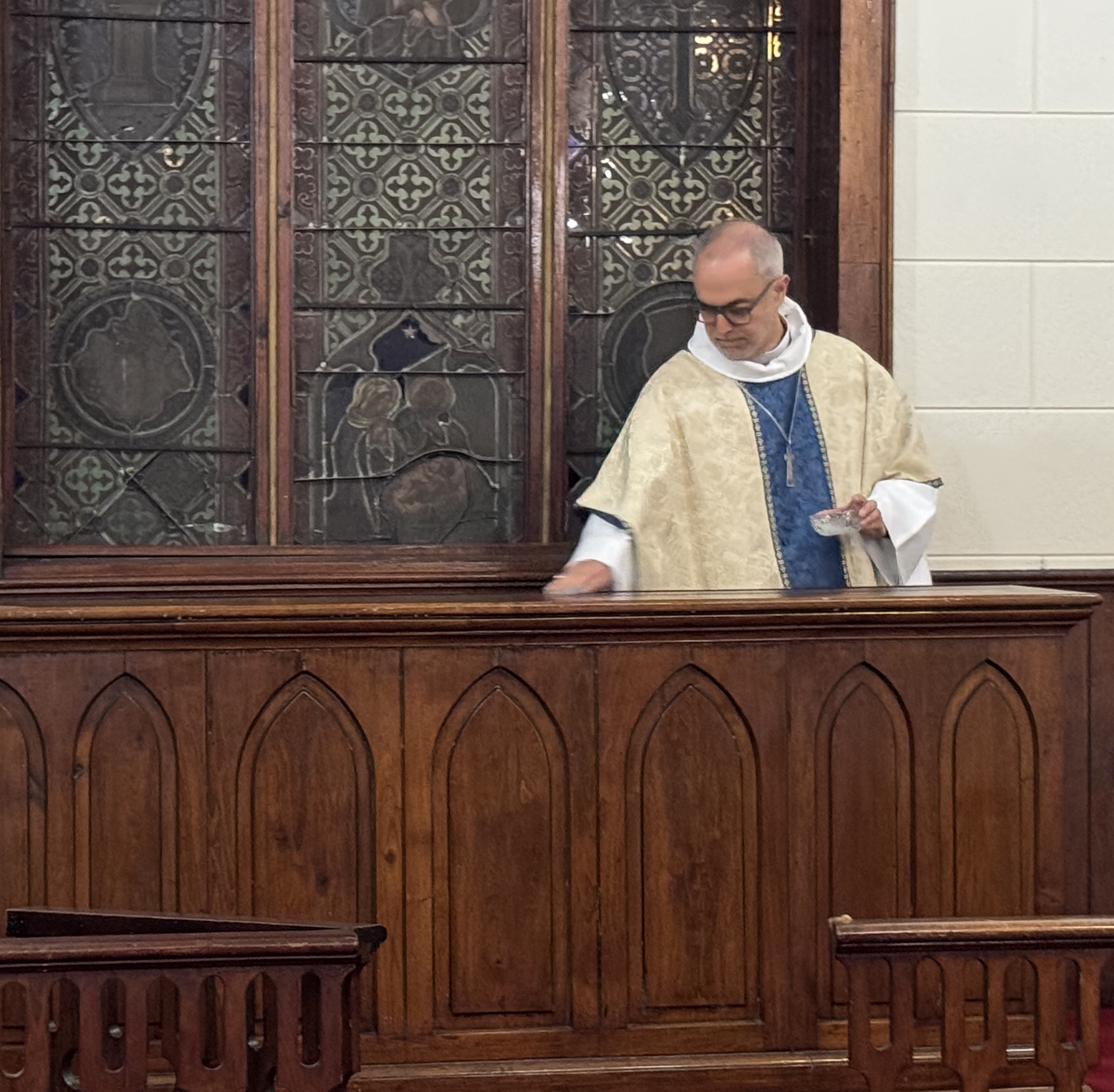
Bishop Craig Loya washing the bare altar during the deconsecration of the Episcopal Church of the Redeemer in Cannon Falls, Minnesota.

Anglican places of worship may be deconsecrated under the direction of the bishop. The Episcopal Church, based in the United States, has a ritual in The Book of Occasional Services which specifies "all consecrated and dedicated objects that are to be preserved are removed" before the "declaration of secularization" is read.

=== Catholicism ===
According to the 1983 Code of Canon Law of the Latin Catholic church, an altar, chapel, or shrine may be deconsecrated if it can no longer be used for divine worship and cannot be restored or if other reasons suggest that it is no longer suitable for its prior purpose. For the bishop to issue a decree declaring the church relegated to a "Secular but not unbecoming purpose", he must consult the presbyteral council of the diocese, obtain the consent of those who may have legal rights, and ensure that the good of Souls will not be harmed. Accordingly, and similarly to in Judaism, no formal deconsecration rite is needed. Altars automatically lose their consecration if they are significantly damaged, one of their anointed corners has been broken or removed, or they have been permanently relegated to secular usage, either de facto or by a decree of the bishop.

== See also ==
- Desacralization of knowledge
- Desecration
- Sacred space
- Genizah
