= Church of the Redeemer (Asheville, North Carolina) =

Historic church in North Carolina, United States

- U.S. National Register of Historic Places
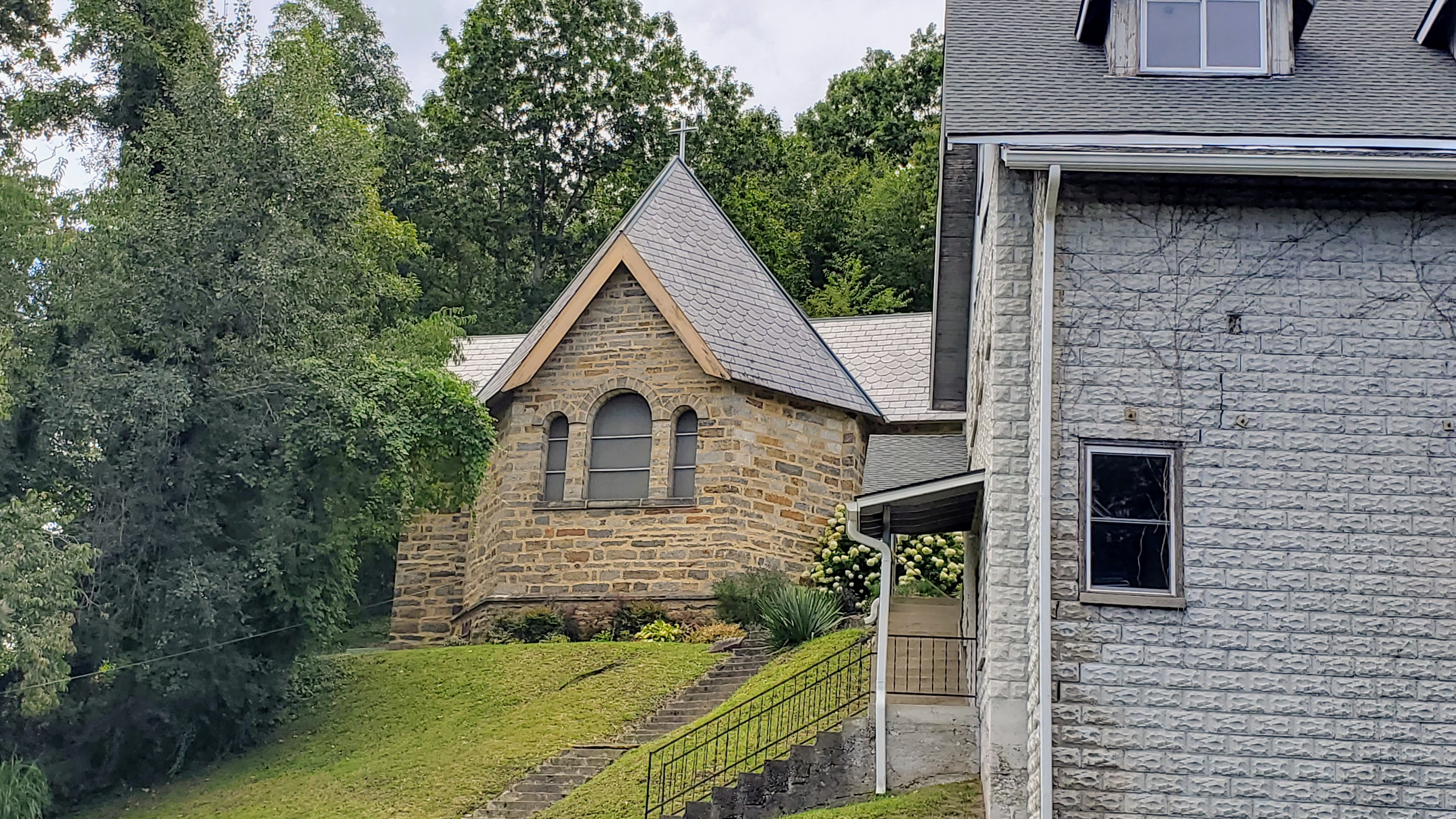
- Church of the Redeemer, 2021

- Location within North Carolina Location within the United States
- Location: 1202 Riverside Drive, Woodfin, North Carolina
- Coordinates: 35°37′28″N 82°35′33″W
- Area: 0.7 acres (0.28 ha)
- Built: 1886-1888
- Architect: Willis, Dr. Francis
- Architectural style: Romanesque
- Website: https://churchoftheredeemer-episcopal.com/
- NRHP reference No.: 85002419
- Added to NRHP: September 19, 1985

Church of the Redeemer is a historic Episcopal church located in Asheville, Buncombe County, North Carolina. It was built in 1886–1888, and is a native stone cruciform chapel in the Romanesque style. It measures 50 feet long and has a steeply pitched slate gable roof. It features stained glass in round-arch windows—including a Tiffany window signed by Louis Comfort Tiffany. Also on the property is a contributing cemetery. It was built by Dr. Francis Willis, a British physician, who built the private chapel on his 100-acre estate.

It was listed on the National Register of Historic Places in 1985.
