= Holy Redeemer Church (Eagle Harbor, Michigan) =

Historic church in Michigan, United States

- U.S. National Register of Historic Places
- Michigan State Historic Site
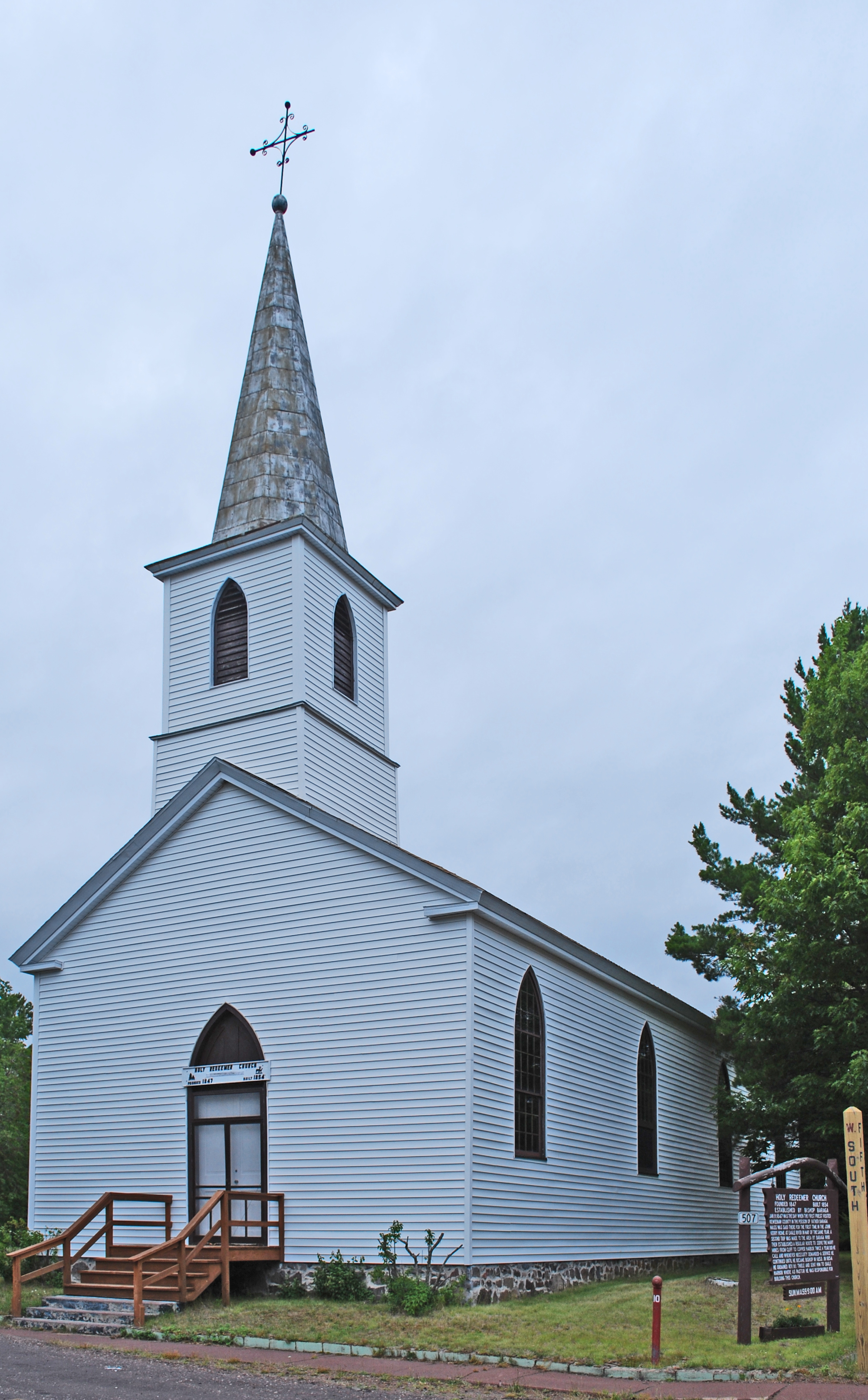

- Location within Michigan Location within the United States
- Interactive map
- Location: West end of Center Street, Eagle Harbor, Michigan
- Coordinates: 47°27′24″N 88°9′54″W
- Built: 1854
- Architectural style: Carpenter Gothic
- NRHP reference No.: 72000629

Significant dates
- Added to NRHP: March 16, 1972
- Designated MSHS: February 19, 1958

Holy Redeemer Church is an historic Carpenter Gothic style Roman Catholic church located at the west end of Center Street in Eagle Harbor, Michigan. It was designated a Michigan State Historic Site in 1958 and listed on the National Register of Historic Places in 1972.

== History ==
Holy Redeemer Church was built in 1854. The church had high attendance when it was first constructed, but as the copper industry declined and the population of Eagle Harbor dropped at the end of the 19th century, the usage of the building dropped. The church sat vacant for many years, but near the end of the 20th century was refurbished and used for summer services.

== Significance ==
The structure is the oldest surviving Roman Catholic church in the Marquette Diocese. The construction was supervised by the diocese's first ordained priest, the Reverend Henry L. Thiele, and the church is dedicated to Bishop Frederic Baraga.

== Description ==
Holy Redeemer Church is a single-story Carpenter Gothic style structure with end gables. The entrance is shaped in a Gothic arch. The belfry is square, with Gothic arch openings, an octagonal steeple and an iron cross at the top. The interior is simply decorated.
