= Church of the Redeemer (Cannon Falls, Minnesota) =

Historic church in Minnesota, United States

- U.S. National Register of Historic Places
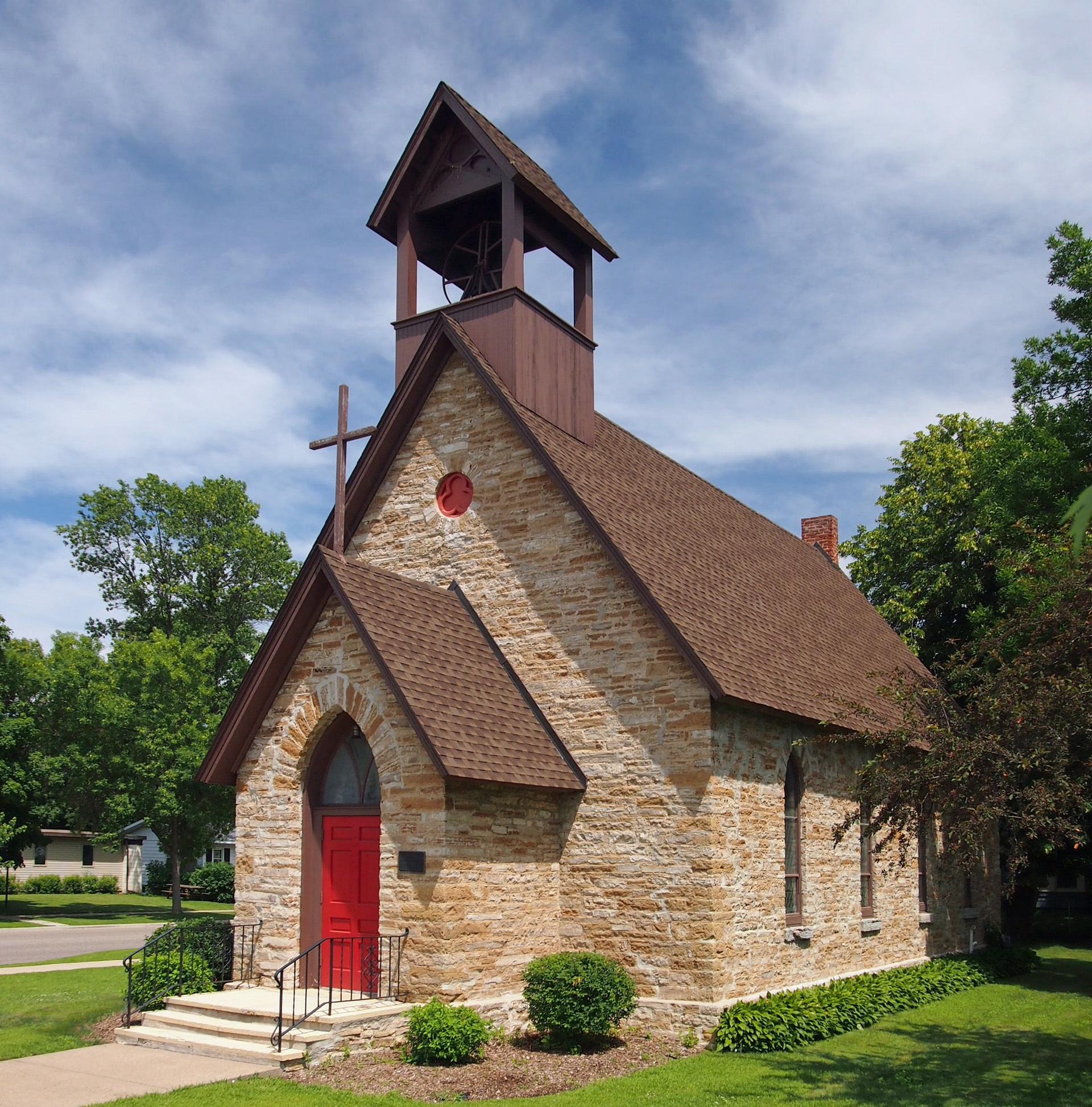
- The church in 2013

- Location within Minnesota Location within the United States
- Location: 123 Third Street North, Cannon Falls, Minnesota
- Coordinates: 44°30′28.9″N 92°54′15.9″W
- Area: less than one acre
- Built: 1867
- Built by: Christopher Doner and Lester Bancroft
- Architectural style: Gothic Revival
- MPS: Rural Goodhue County MRA
- NRHP reference No.: 80002040
- Added to NRHP: February 12, 1980

The Church of the Redeemer is a historic Episcopal church located at 123 Third Street North in Cannon Falls in the U.S. state of Minnesota. The building was built with limestone and wood in 1867.

Episcopal families started meeting in private homes for about eight years before they decided to build a church. The minister traveled from Hastings, by foot or by horseback, for about 18 miles (29 km). In 1866, the congregation decided to build a church. Christopher Doner drew up the plans, while Lester Bancroft did the masonry. The stone was Platteville Limestone quarried from a farm north of Cannon Falls. Bishop Henry Benjamin Whipple laid the cornerstone on June 28, 1866. When the church was complete, at a cost of about $3500, Bishop Whipple returned on May 1, 1867, to consecrate the church.

On February 12, 1980, it was added to the National Register of Historic Places. In November 2025, Bishop Craig Loya of the Episcopal Church in Minnesota led "a service of deconsecration and thanksgiving" as the parish had closed after 160 years.

== Gallery ==
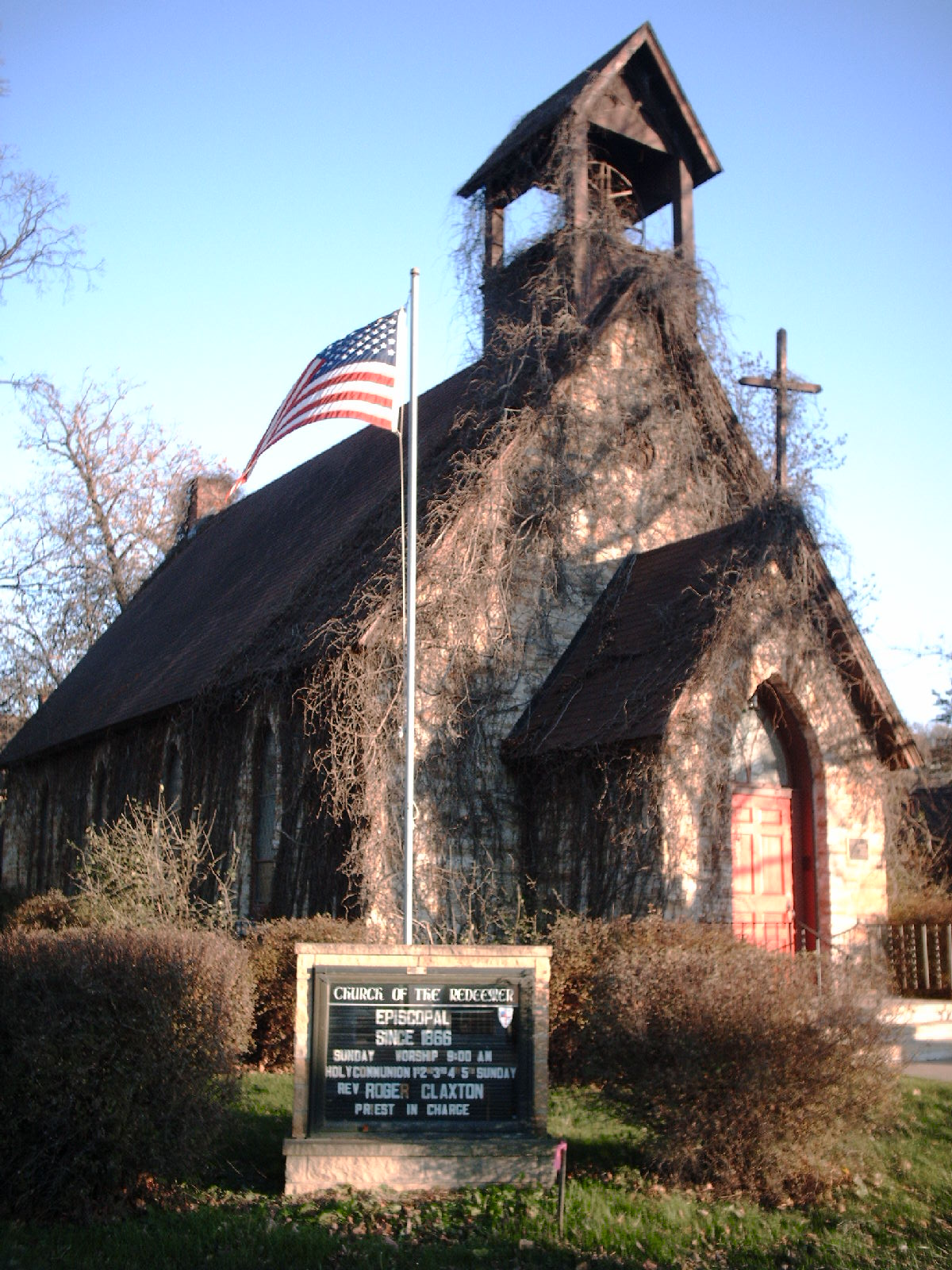
Exterior in 2006, covered in ivy

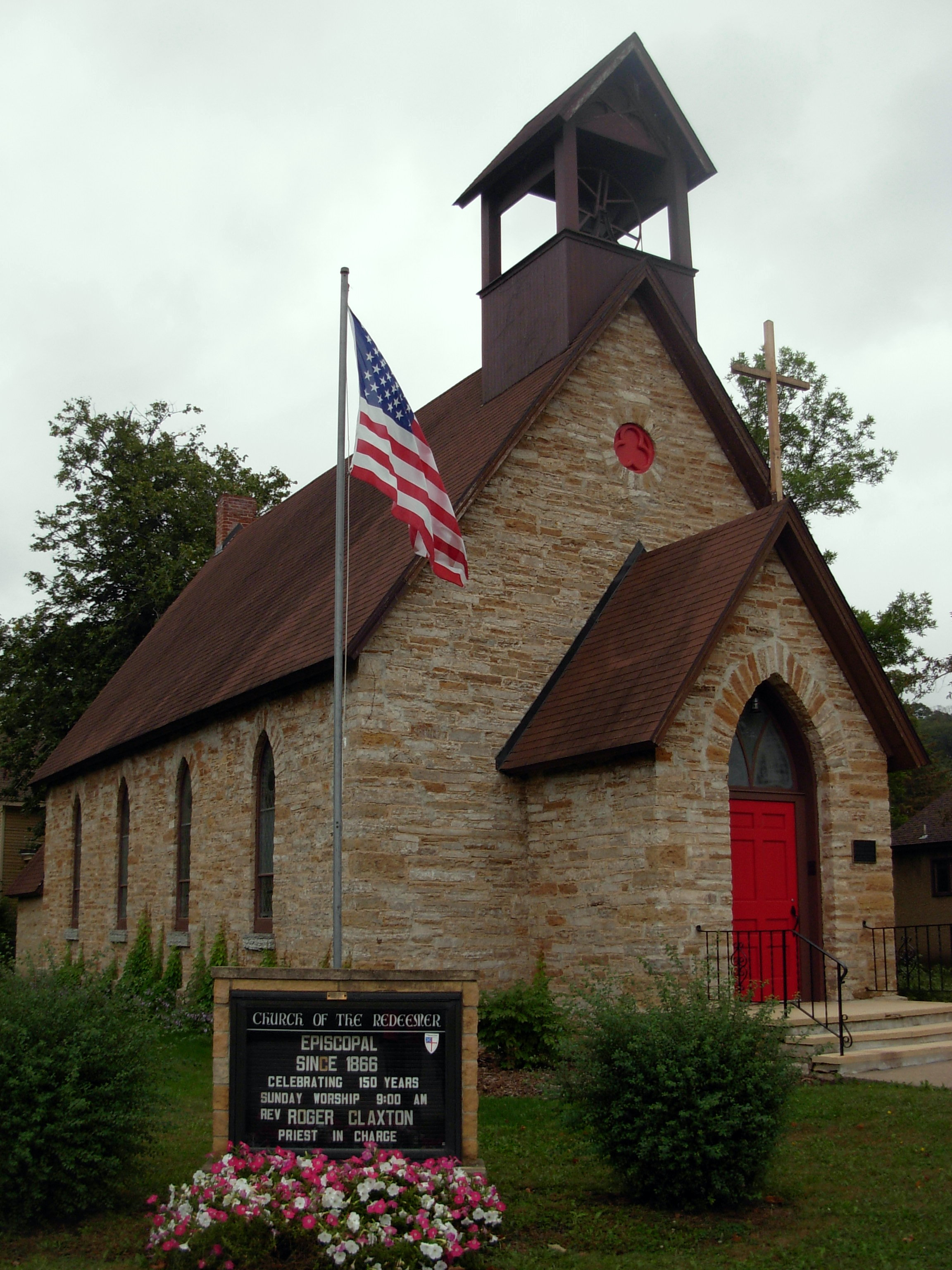
Exterior in 2008, after restoration work

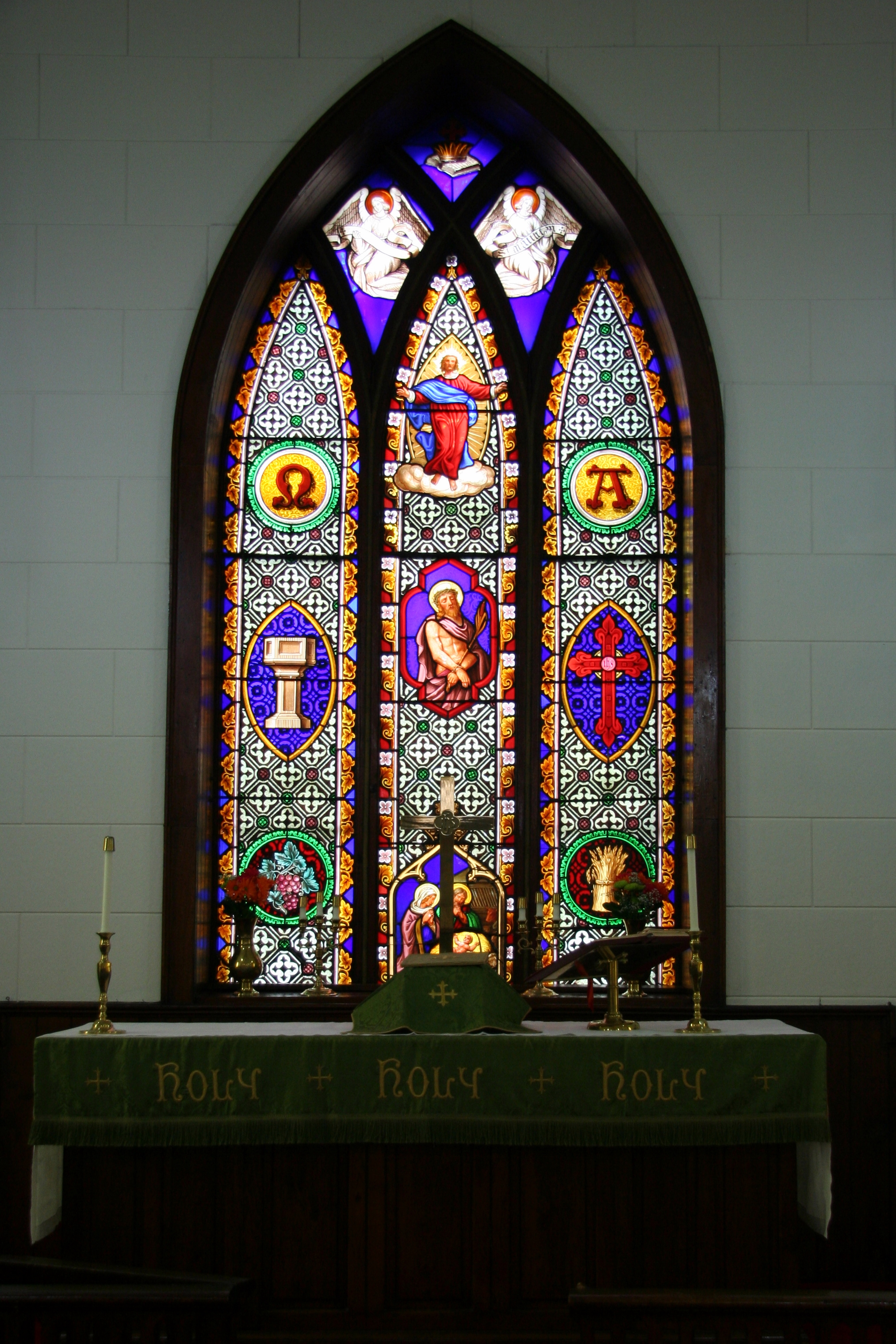
The altar and central stained glass window

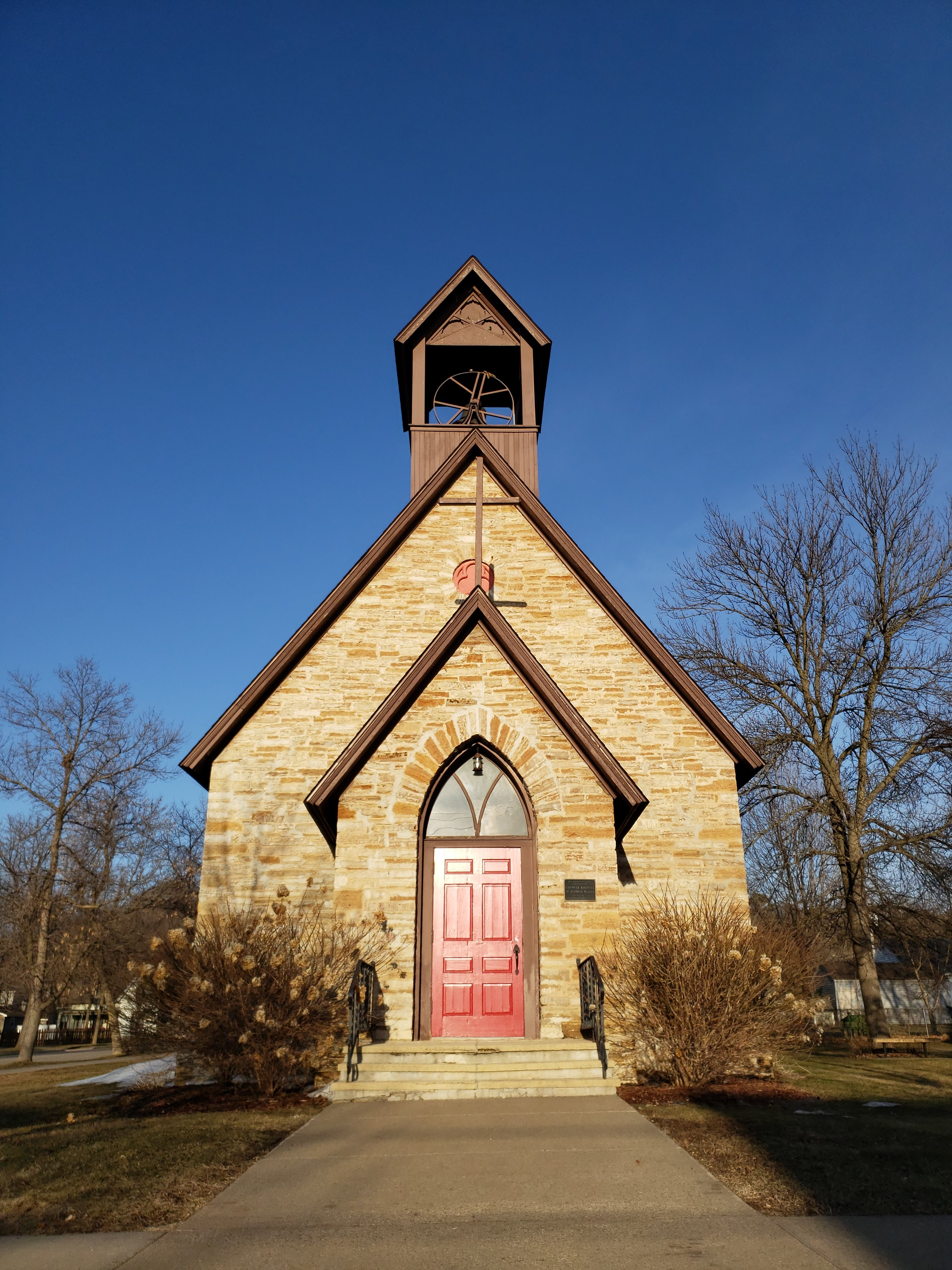
Church of the Redeemer in 2018.
