= Bernhard Willhelm =

German fashion designer (born 1972)

Bernhard Willhelm (born 3 November 1972 in Ulm) is a German fashion designer.

== Education and first season ==
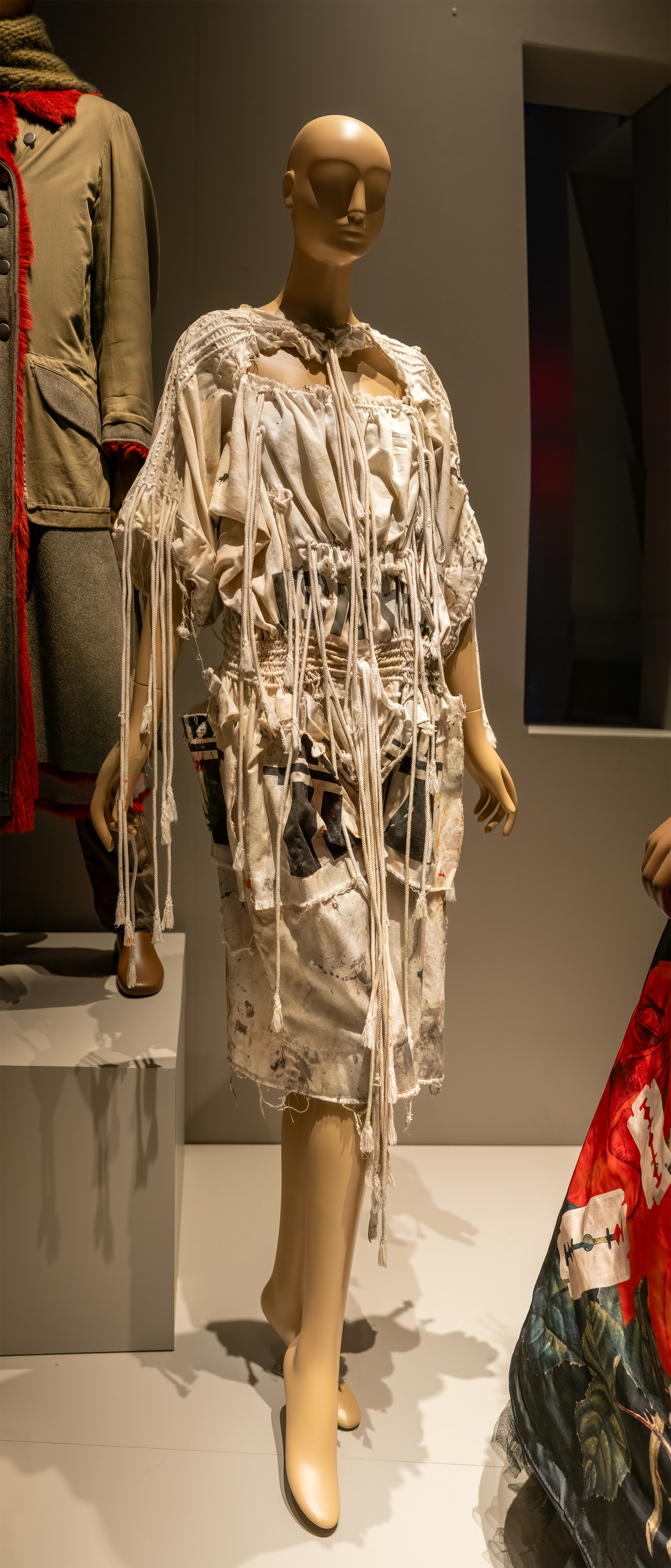
Off-white jumpsuit, 2012-2013, in the Museum at FIT

Bernhard Willhelm studied fashion design at the Royal Academy of Fine Arts in Antwerp, during which he assisted Walter van Beirendonck, Alexander McQueen, Vivienne Westwood and Dirk Bikkembergs. In 1998, he established his namesake fashion house, together with Jutta Kraus. They debuted their first womenswear collection in 1999 and their first menswear collection was introduced in 2000.

In 2002, Bernhard Willhelm moved their design studio from Antwerp to Paris, at which time Willhelm also became creative director for the fashion house Capucci through 2004.

== Later work ==
From 2009 up until 2014, Willhem held the position of head of the fashion department at Universität für Angewandte Kunst in Vienna, Austria. In 2011, Willhelm relocated his team temporarily to Puerto Vallarta, Mexico, and later in 2013 to Los Angeles, where the company has been based since.

== Style ==
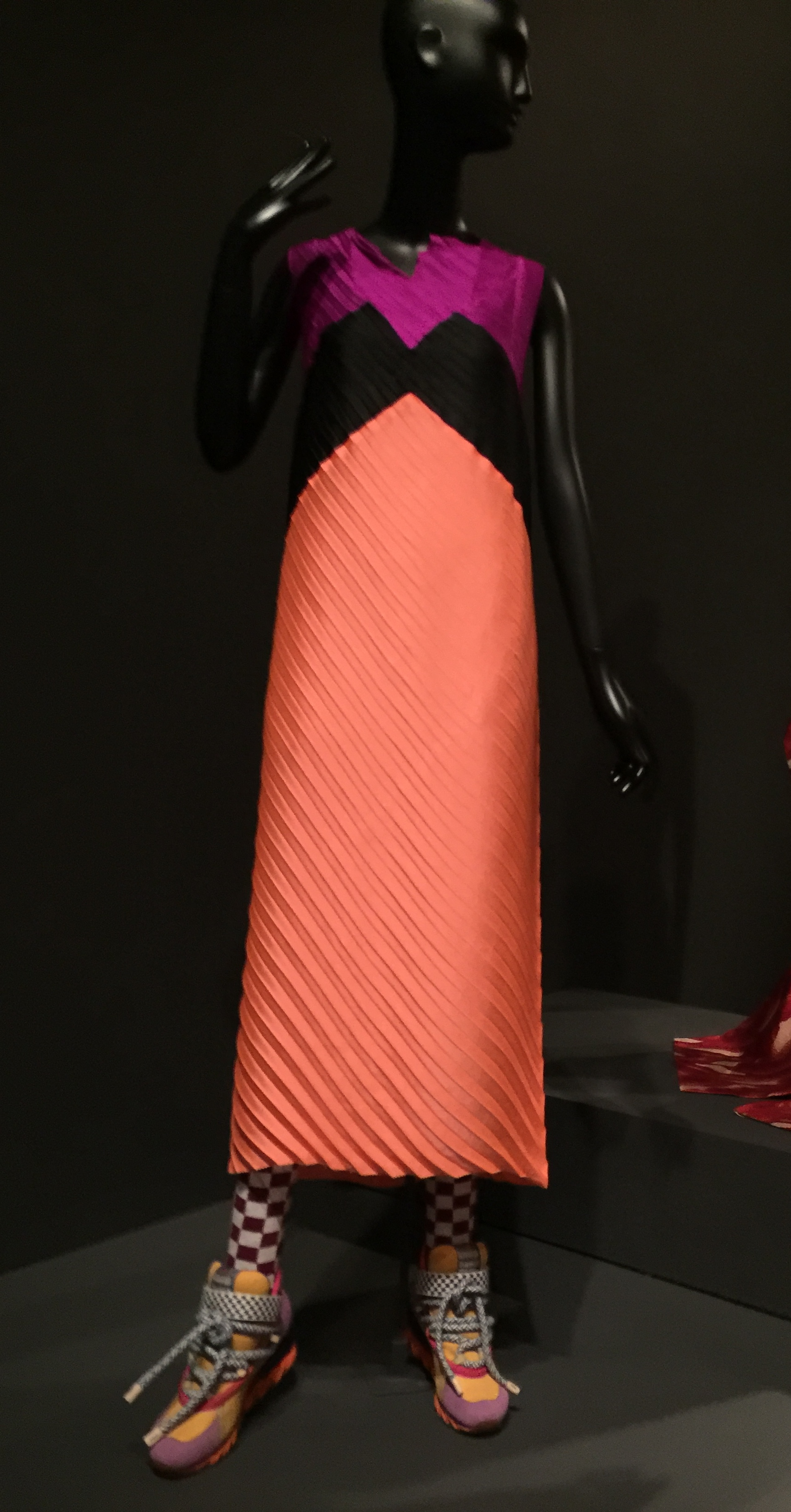
Dress by Bernhard Willhelm with trainers by Camper, Spring-Summer 2013. (PMA)

Wilhellm's clothing has been described as being typified by craftsmanship, eclecticism, and irony. His inspirations range from South German folklore, historical costume to sport and traditional Japanese dress as well as questions of diversity, the human condition, facets of culture and perceptions of reality.

Eccentric silhouettes, for both men and women, are additional characteristic features of Willhelm's work.

Wilhelm is known for his unconventional approach to presenting seasonal collections, preferring installations, performances and tableaux vivants over the fashion runway.

His career has been marked by collaborations with artists and creatives across disciplines, including Bjork, Olaf Breuning, Cutler X, Joe Dallesandro, Carsten Fock, William Forsythe, Carmen Freudenthal, Item Idem, Nick Knight, Nikolaus Schafhausen, Rade Petrasevic, Elle Verhagen, Tony Ward, and Lukas Wassmann.

== Special projects ==
In 2001 Willhelm posed naked in the first issue of magazine Butt, in a pictorial shot by Turner Prize-winning photographer Wolfgang Tillmans.

In 2013, Willhelm presented his men / women AW13-14 collection, in the form of a dance performance in collaboration with Josh Johnson and The William Forsythe Company, Frankfurt.

Willhelm has worked on a number of films, including Men In Tights, a collaboration with fashion photographer Nick Knight, which was shown in conjunction with his AW08-9 Menswear Collection and Red Rose Pink Donkey, made in collaboration with Dirk Bonn and screened at Athens Biennale.

Willhelm created costumes for Bjork, used for her Volta album cover and her 2007 World Tour, as well as for R.W. Fassbinder’s play Die bitteren Tränen der Petra von Kant, shown at Deutsches Theater in Berlin.

== Commercial collaborations ==
Willhelm has engaged in a number of commercial collaborations. From 2008 to 2015 he worked with Spanish footwear company CAMPER on a line of men and women's shoes.

In 2009, he commenced a partnership with German eyewear brand MYKITA. His collection of sunglasses featured color gradient lenses.

Willlhelm has also worked with Swedish rug manufacturer Henzel Studio on a collection of rugs and pillows that feature proclaiming statements drawn from the exhibition BERNHARD WILLHELM 3000: When Fashion Shows The Danger Then Fashion Is The Danger at the Museum of Contemporary Art Los Angeles (MOCA).

== Exhibitions ==
- 2015: BERNHARD WILLHELM 3000: WHEN FASHION IS THE DANGER, THEN FASHION IS THE DANGER at the Museum of Contemporary Art, Los Angeles
- 2009 Bernhard Willhelm Jutta Kraus at Groninger Museum, Groninger, The Netherlands.
- 2007 BERNHARD WILLHELM: HET TOTAAL RAPPEL at MOMU Fashion Museum, Antwerp, Belgium.
