= C International Photo Magazine =

- Categories: Photography
- Frequency: Biannual
- Founder: Elena Ochoa Foster
- Founded: 2006
- Company: Ivorypress
- Country: Spain
- Based in: Madrid
- Language: English, Spanish
- Website: www.ivorypress.com/en/editorial-page/c-photo-page/

C International Photo Magazine covers contemporary photography in a range of cultural, geographic and themes. It was created by Elena Ochoa Foster, founder of Ivorypress and is published twice yearly. It comes in two different editions, English/Chinese and Spanish/Japanese and is designed by Oscar Mariné creator of Pedro Almodóvar's movie posters.

== Description ==
With a hardback cover and 300 pages, C International resembles a book more than a magazine. The magazine emphasizes design and aims to replicate the white walls and neutral background of an art gallery, with no interfering text in its central pages. Its creator said 'It would be extremely provincial to do it just in English,' and noted 'First I thought we would make it half in English and half in Spanish. Then I began to go to China a lot, and after discovering many photographers there, I knew a magazine like C Photo would have a following. I am convinced that Asia is the future'.

The publisher of C International is Ivory Press.

== Magazine sections ==
Within the core photographic pages, each issue has sub-sections: Collector, Archive, Scope, Portfolio, C Action, Vintage and Guest.

In every issue the magazine publishes a private or public photographic collection alongside an interview with the owner or responsible curator of the collection in order to better understand the criteria behind the collection.

The archive section sheds light on previously unpublished or unknown works, such as those of Isamu Noguchi, and Francis Bacon, and archives the charting history of cities such as London and Shanghai.

This section provides an eclectic view of the world of international image making. Scope shows a selection of contemporary artists. It aims to illustrate the creative pulse of contemporary photography.

Portfolio presents works created by contemporary photographers. Some of them comprise recent and unpublished works, while others live alongside previous series that help to bring each artist's work into context and to outline their evolution over the last few years.

C Photo Magazine has established an initiative to promote the creation of contemporary photography. In each issue two artists are commissioned for a series that is published exclusively in this section of the magazine. The authors are awarded a cash grant as a contribution to the production of a portfolio that is made up of a minimum of six photographs. An edition of up to four copies is made from these works.

The series created in this way for the C Action initiative has become part of C International Photo Magazine's Collection of Contemporary Photography, and will be gradually circulated both within its pages and through other media. The selection of participating artists is made by the editorial team of the magazine, in collaboration with various curators, gallery owners and photography specialists of both private and public institutions. The selected artists' profiles are not subject to any prior conditions, including geographical origin or subject matter of the work presented.

The legacy of the masters of photography is represented in the Vintage section.

=== Guest ===
In each issue, C Photo Magazine invites a ‘guest’, generally from a creative field outside of photography, to reveal their most recent ventures into photography or how they use it in their creative processes. This section approaches photography from a different angle, and as a result, reveals the multi-faceted nature of this medium. Wim Wenders, Brian Eno, Bill Viola and Marina Abramović are amongst guest collaborators.

The publication is predominantly devoted to photography. Included within its opening pages, however, are a number of essays by renowned writers, philosophers, and artists who explore a wide range of viewpoints about the role and significance of photography.

C International Photo Magazine ultimately intends to create an encyclopaedia of photography, one that can be used as a source of reference for years to come.
