= Oscar Mariné =

Spanish artist (born 1951)

Oscar Mariné Brandi (born 1951 in Madrid, Spain) is a designer, illustrator, expert typographer and professional artist. His work includes designs for filmmakers like Pedro Almodóvar, Alex de la Iglesia, and Julio Médem, musicians like Bruce Springsteen, The Psychedelic Furs or Brian Eno, the press (El País, C International Photo Magazine) and a variety of firms (Absolut Vodka, Hugo Boss, Camper, Loewe etc.) He is the founder of OMB Graphic Design studio in Madrid.

== Biography ==
Oscar Mariné Brandi (born 1951 in Madrid, Spain)

Mariné has produced works in areas as diverse as publishing, corporate communications, film and music.

=== Early days - Madrid Me Mata magazine (1980s) ===
Mariné was founder and artistic director of the counter-cultural magazine Madrid Me Mata during the La Movida Madrileña of the 1980s.

=== As a graphic designer/communicator (1991 to date) ===
In the area of branding, his projects for Camper, Loewe and Vega Sicilia are well known in Spanish design circles. International achievements include the US advertising campaign for Absolut Vodka Absolut Mariné for Seagram USA, his work for Swatch, Benetton's Fabrica and the Japanese Narizuka Corporation. Also the development of the brand for Sir Norman Foster's architectural studio in London, Foster and Partners, where his concepts remit one to the aesthetics of London in the swinging '60s.

He has an extensive portfolio of editorial projects, and in the world of journalism, in 2007, the Spanish newspaper El País entrusted his studio with the design of their leading editions. The El País Semanal (the Sunday glossy magazine) has recovered its original name, Babelia (the Saturday newspaper's cultural review) has totally transformed its contents. Domingo (the Sunday newspaper's current affairs section) provides in-depth journalism for the weekend. He has also supervised the overall redesign of the daily newspaper, altering typographic protocols. Since 2005 Mariné is responsible for the art direction of the design of the C International Photo Magazine published by IvoryPress, London.

Many musicians have requested Mariné's input in the creation of their album covers: Bruce Springsteen, Immaculate Fools, The Psychedelic Furs, Andrés Calamaro, Los Rodríguez, Brian Eno, Kevin Ayers, Siniestro Total, Michel Camilo and Tomatito to name just a few.

His projects for film include iconic posters for All About My Mother by Pedro Almodóvar, The Day of the Beast by Alex de la Iglesia, and Tierra by Julio Médem. This connection with cinema continues with designs for film festivals such as Zinebi International Festival of Documentary and Short Films of Bilbao (Spain), where Mariné's poster was awarded the New York Art Directors Club Award for 2000.

He also designed the official look for the last two editions of the San Sebastián International Film Festival (Spain) and all of its sections. His Federico García Lorca-like designs are featured in the scenery of the flamenco dancer Eva Yerbabuena's show El huso de la memoria.

=== Current work ===
Recent projects include the brand for Madrid's new cultural center, Matadero Madrid.

Other work includes: Exhibition Sebastiao Salgado "The Workers" for the National Library Madrid, publications for the Seville 1991 Universal Exposition, various for ICEX - Spanish Institute for Exterior Commerce, art catalogues for the IVAM - Valencia Institute of Modern Art, campaigns for the Junta de Castilla-La Mancha, exhibition graphics for the National Museum of Reina Sofia Center, multitude of projects over the past 15 years for the Huelva Tourist Board, launch for the Spanish Television + Radio- rtve, exhibition for The United Nations, and other works for Sgae-General Association of Authors and Editors, Caja Madrid Group, Santander Bank, 40 Principales, Los Aljibes and Paternina Vineyards, La Ser radio, Canal+, Condé Nast, El Corte Inglés, Santiago Bernabéu Stadium, Hugo Boss, Pepsi, Tissot Watches, Diseño Interior, Cambio 16, Marie Claire España, Amnesty International...

=== As an artist (1991 to date) ===
Mariné's pictorial work has been the subject of solo exhibitions in Tokyo, New York, Milan, Venice, Bologna, Madrid and Ibiza, and also forms a part of many collective shows.

== Graphic design awards ==
- 2010 National Award of Design. (Premio Nacional de Diseño) Government of Spain.

== Individual exhibitions ==
- 2002 "Mariné" Galería Almirante, Madrid
- 2003 "Mariné: No Money No Honey" Galería Magenta 52, Milán
- 2005 "Mariné: Buenos Aires, Videos and Photography" PHotoEspaña 05, Casa de América, Madrid
- 2005 "Mariné: Buenos Aires, Videos and Photography" Museum of Fine Arts of Bilbao
- 2006 "Days of Glory" ABA Art Contemporani, Palma de Mallorca
- 2007 "Latest Serie (screenprints)" Estampa 2007, Madrid
- 2008 Estampa 2008, Madrid
