= Demetrio Paparoni =

Italian art critic and curator (b. 1954)

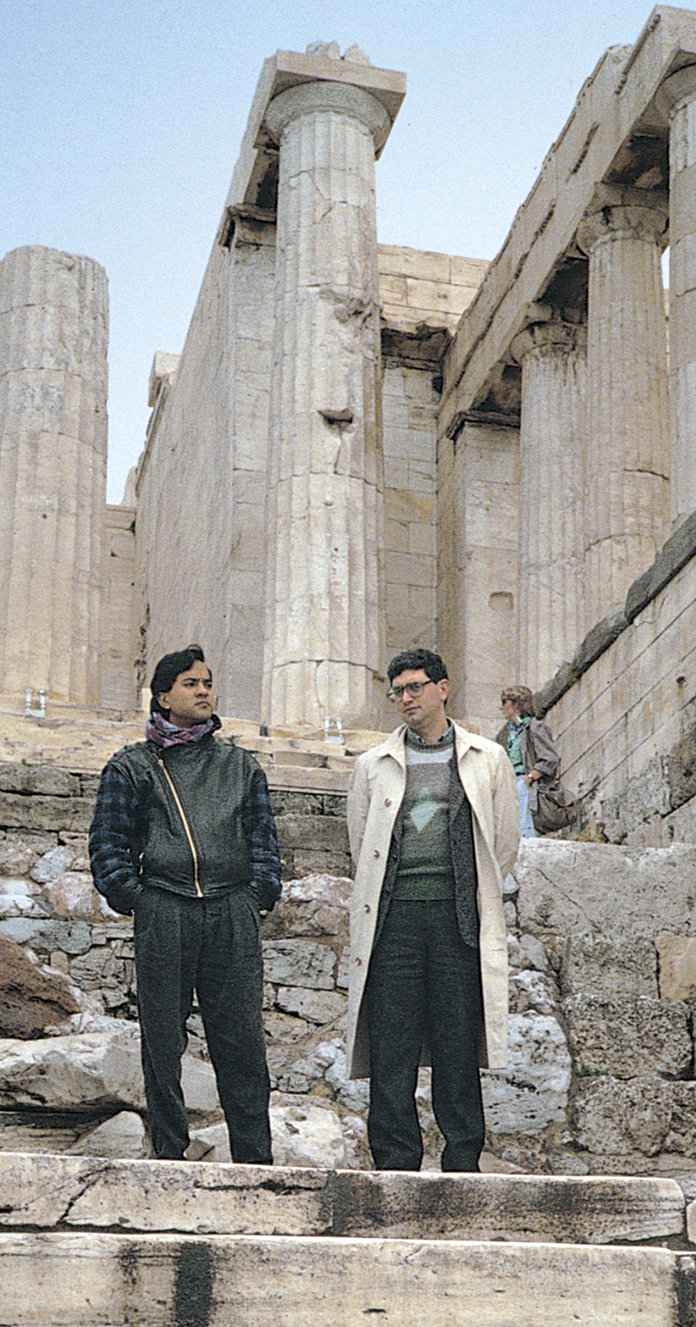
- Anish Kapoor and Demetrio Paparoni, Athens 1983
- Born: January 25, 1954 (age 72); Siracusa, Italy
- Occupations: Art critic; Curator; Writer; Editor
- Website: demetriopaparoni.com

Demetrio Paparoni (born Siracusa, Italy, 1954) is an Italian art critic, curator, writer, and editor who has taught History of Modern Art and History of Contemporary Art at the University of Catania.

== Art criticism ==
Paparoni is the art critic of the Italian newspaper Domani. He has curated a number of major exhibitions. In 1983 he founded the contemporary art magazine Tema Celeste and the publishing house of the same name, which he ran until 2000.

His art criticism books include The Devil: A Visual History (Cernunnos/Abrams). and Art and Posthistory, Conversations on the End of Aesthetics written with Arthur Danto (Columbia University Press).

Paparoni has published monographs on Chuck Close, Jonathan Lasker, Timothy Greenfield-Sanders (Alberico Cetti Serbelloni editore), Wang Guangyi, Natee Utarit, Ronald Ventura, Gottfried Helnwein (Skira), Nyoman Masriadi, Rafael Megall, Andres Barrioquinto (Rizzoli New York).

His essays are featured in monographs and catalogs of many artists including Jean-Michel Basquiat, Peter Halley, Keith Haring, Edward Hopper, Zhang Huan, Alex Katz, David La Chapelle, Markus Lupertz, Tony Oursler, Mimmo Paladino, Michelangelo Pistoletto, David Salle, Jenny Saville, Sean Scully, Li Songsong, Doug and Mike Starn, Joana Vasconcelos, and Andy Warhol, among others.
