= St. Joseph's Institution, Singapore =

Independent school in Singapore

St. Joseph's Institution

Location
- 38 Malcolm Road; Singapore 308274; Singapore; 1.3236°N 103.8273°E

Information
- Type: Independent
- Motto: Ora Et Labora (Pray and Work)
- Religious affiliations: Catholic; Lasallian Brothers
- Established: 1852; 174 years ago
- School code: 7020
- Chairman: Lee Kok Fatt
- Principal: Justin Arul Pierre
- Brother President: Bro Paul Ho, FSC
- Enrolment: 2,000
- Houses: Fintan, Lawrence, Marcian, Michael
- Colour: Green White
- Website: www.sji.edu.sg

St. Joseph's Institution (SJI) is an independent Catholic educational institution in Singapore. Founded in 1852 by the De La Salle Brothers, it is the first Catholic school and the third oldest school in the country.

SJI has been offering a dual-track education comprising the GCE Ordinary Level Programme (OP) and the Integrated Programme (IP) track since 2013. The IP track which leads to the International Baccalaureate Diploma Programme (IBDP), integrates the four-year secondary education with a two-year IBDP, where IP students can proceed onto the two-year IBDP without the need to complete the O-Level examinations at the end of their fourth year. The OP students will take their O-Level examinations at the end of their fourth year. Based on their O-Level examination results, they can apply to continue the IBDP at SJI, or pursue their studies at other junior colleges or polytechnics.

The school had its first IP intake at Secondary 1 and Secondary 3 in 2013 and 2014 respectively while the first IBDP intake was in 2013.

The school's current principal is Justin Arul Pierre, a former cluster superintendent in the schools division, who assumed principalship in January 2022.

The school's four fraternities, Fintan, Lawrence, Marcian and Michael, are named after Brother Fintan Blake, Brother Lawrence Robless, Brother Marcian James Cullen and Brother Michael Noctor respectively. The school's thirteen blocks, not counting the chapel or the brothers’ quarters, are named after Julian-Nicolas Rèche, Benildus Romançon, Cyril Bertrán, the school's founder Jean-Baptiste de La Salle, Evencio Uyarra, Florencio Martín, Gabriel Drolin, Jaime Hilario Barbal, former principal Kevin Byrne, the school's first principal Liefroy Bajon, Mutien-Marie Wiaux, the Notre Dame de La Star and Solomon Leclercq.

== History ==
St Joseph's Institution (SJI), originally known as St. John's Institution, was founded in 1852 as the first missionary establishment of the De La Salle Brothers in the Far East. This endeavour was initiated by Rev Fr Jean-Marie Beurel MEP, who offered the opportunity to six Brothers from Europe to start the school using a former chapel as premises. Within a year, an attap hut had to be erected to accommodate all the students.

On 19 March 1855 (Feast of Saint Joseph), the cornerstone of a new school building at Bras Basah Road was laid, and from that date, the school came to be known as St. Joseph's Institution. The new central classroom block was completed in 1865, though the further expansion of the facilities continued well into the 20th century. The school had 426 students in 1900. This grew to almost 1200 in 1914, and 1600 in 1922. With the student population expanding, a temporary branch school was opened, which eventually led to the building of a second school – Saint Patrick's School, Singapore – in 1933.

During World War II, prior to the fall of Singapore to the Japanese, the school was used as a Red Cross hospital and housed a unit of the Civil Defence Force, the A.R.F. (Air Raid Precautionary Group). On 16 February 1942, a bomb hit the school courtyard during the war, leaving a crater, but the main building remained unscathed. However, the original grandfather's clock brought by the brothers on the first voyage was hit by a wooden splinter and stopped. It remains at SJI to this day.

During the Japanese occupation of Singapore, the school was renamed to Bras Basah Road Boys' School. The Brothers were asked to 'resign' and the school and hostel were run along military lines. Three weeks after the Japanese surrender, the Brothers returned and St Joseph's was re-opened and normal lessons resumed.

In 1975, St Joseph's Institution's first-year pre-university classes and some of its teachers were transferred to the newly opened Catholic Junior College.

In 1988, St. Joseph's Institution shifted into a new campus at Malcolm Road situated just off the neighbourhood of Toa Payoh, beside the Tanglin Community Centre. The old campus, with its distinctive semi-circular wings, was gazetted by the Singapore National Heritage Board as a national monument. It housed the Singapore Art Museum from 1996 to 2017.

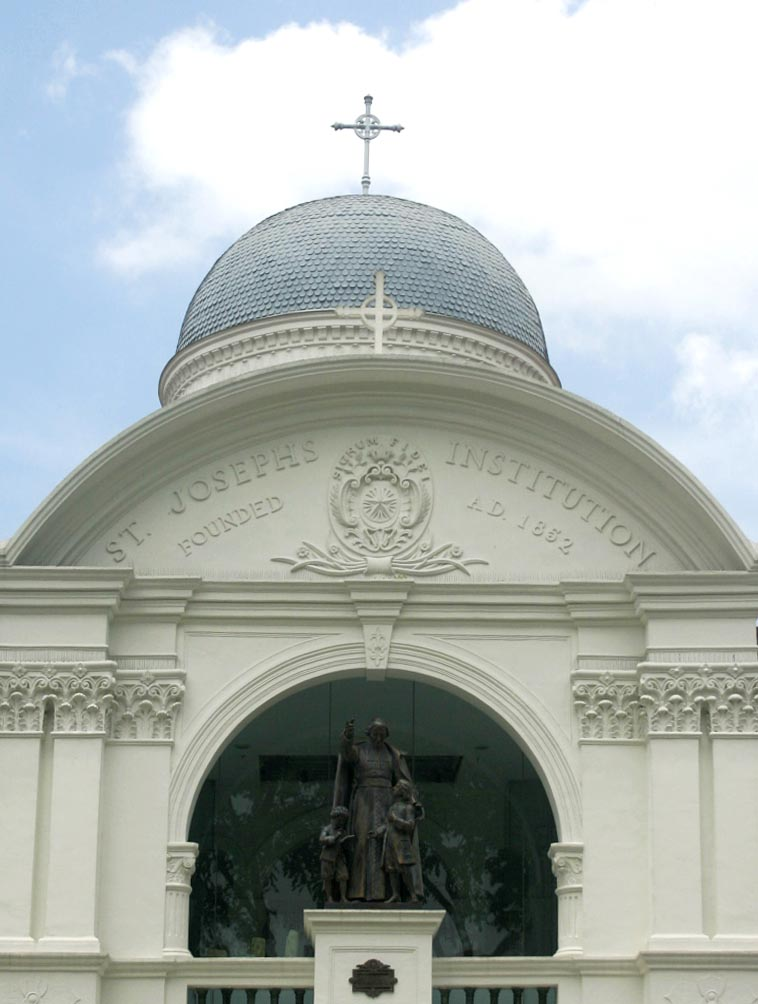
Sculpture of St John Baptist de la Salle, founder of the Institute of Brothers of the Christian Schools (La Salle Brothers), on the second floor of the portico of the former SJI campus at Bras Basah.

Under the administration of Brother Paul Anthony Rogers, St Joseph's Institution saw its peak in growth. In 1995, a Performing Arts Centre (PAC) and a new wing to house Secondary One students were added.

In 2006, St. Joseph's Institution, upon the urging of the Economic Development Board, began an international school. SJI International (St Joseph's Institution International) began classes in January 2007.

It was also the first year in which only pure sciences were offered to every candidate.

In 2013, St. Joseph's Institution took in its first intake of Year 5 male and female students under the International Baccalaureate Diploma Programme (IBDP), with an inaugural batch of 80 students admitted. That same year, St Joseph's Institution also had its first intake of secondary 1 male students into its Integrated Programme (IP) which will culminate with the IBDP when they are year 5. St Joseph's Institution also bolstered its academic staff and upgraded its facilities for the IBDP student block to provide the necessary infrastructure and support for the students to develop to their fullest potential.

At the end of 2013, St. Joseph's Institution moved to a holding campus at Bishan Street 14, while the main campus at Malcolm Road was undergoing renovations. On 20 July 2015, works to redevelop the school began, with a new target of moving back by March 2017.

On 9 January 2017, St. Joseph's Institution moved back to their main campus at 38 Malcolm Road, after two years of renovations. The renovated campus featured two new blocks exclusively for IBDP students (Blocks A and B).

== Affiliated schools ==
- Primary schools:
  - De La Salle School (DLSS)
  - St. Joseph's Institution Junior (SJIJ), formerly St. Michael's School
  - St. Stephen's School (SSS)
  - St. Anthony's Primary School (SAPS)
- Tertiary institution (non-Lasallian school):
  - Catholic Junior College (CJC)

== The Lasallian Family ==
- Primary schools:
  - De La Salle School (DLSS)
  - St. Joseph's Institution Junior (SJIJ), formerly St. Michael's School
  - St. Stephen's School (SSS)
  - St. Anthony's Primary School (SAPS)
- Secondary school:
  - St. Patrick's School (SPS)
- International school:
  - St. Joseph's Institution International (SJII)
- Tertiary institution (non-Lasallian school):
  - Catholic Junior College (CJC)

== Uniform ==
The school uniform is a simple, white collared shirt with the school badge on the pocket. The secondary school boys (Years 1 and 2) wear white shorts and white long pants are worn by the Year 3 and 4 boys. The IBDP boys in Years 5 and 6 wear a white shirt with a green inner collar and the school badge on the pocket with white long pants while the girls wear a white blouse with the school badge on the left hand side and a dark green skirt. The shirt is tucked into the pants.

The school tie is worn on the first weekday of school from the start of the school day until 9.30 am, and at all formal school functions. The top button is buttoned when the tie is worn.

School prefects and those authorised to wear the school's green blazer with the school's crest are permitted to wear simple, black, leather shoes when they are formally attired.

== Co-curricular activities ==
=== Co-curricular activities ===
SJI has three main groups of co-curricular activities: sports, uniformed groups and clubs & societies. SJI's niches include canoeing, football and table tennis.

The St Joseph's Institution Military Band (SJIMB) clinched the Gold with Honours Award under the baton of Mr Tan Thiam Hee in the recent 2009 Singapore Youth Festival Central Judging, the highest achievable award in that competition. It was one of the top 10 bands in the competition to do so. In the 2011 Singapore Youth Festival Central Judging, the band managed to clinch the Silver award. The choice piece was the Seventh Night of July and the set piece was the Memories of Friendship.

== Notable alumni ==
=== Politics ===
- Tony Tan, 7th president of Singapore
- Teo Chee Hean, former Senior Minister of Singapore
- Edwin Tong, Minister for Law and Member of Parliament for Marine Parade GRC
- Christopher De Souza, Deputy Speaker of the Parliament and Member of Parliament for Holland-Bukit Timah GRC
- George Yeo, former minister for foreign affairs
- Mah Bow Tan, former minister for national development
- Charles Chong, former Member of Parliament
- Matthias Yao, former Member of Parliament
- Ng Pock Too, former Member of Parliament
- Tan Chye Cheng, Member of the Legislative Council of Singapore (1948–1955)
- Daniel Goh, former Non-Constituency Member of Parliament (NCMP)

=== Governmental organisations ===
- Gerard Ee, chairman, Agency for Integrated Care and chairman, Charity Council (Singapore)
- Philip Yeo, chairman, SPRING Singapore and former chairman, A*STAR
- Tan Chorh Chuan, chief health scientist, Ministry of Health (MOH) and executive director, Office for Healthcare Transformation, Ministry of Health. former president, National University of Singapore and former director, Medical Services, Ministry of Health.

=== Business ===
- Ee Peng Liang – businessman and philanthropist
- Khoo Teck Puat – late Singapore tycoon
- Anthoni Salim – head of Salim Group

=== Sports ===
- Goh Tat Chuan – former national soccer player
- Jacob Mahler – national soccer player
- Rudy Mosbergen – former field hockey Olympian and founder of Raffles Junior College
- Tan Eng Yoon – former sprinting Olympian

=== Arts and entertainment ===
- Chong Fah Cheong – Cultural Medallion winner for visual arts (2014)
- Dick Lee – musician; Cultural Medallion winner (2004)
- Goh Sin Tub – A pioneer of Singapore literature and a teacher, civil servant, banker, builder, social worker and former chairman of the SJI Board of Governors
- Jeremy Monteiro – jazz pianist; board member, National Arts Council; Cultural Medallion winner (2002)
- Julian Hee – Mediacorp artiste
- Jahan Loh – contemporary artist
- Anthony Then – dancer and choreographer

=== Legal ===
- Chan Seng Onn – judge of the High Court of Singapore (since July 2007), former solicitor-general of Singapore (2001–2007)
- Davinder Singh, S.C. – lawyer, former MP, CEO of Drew & Napier
- Steven Chong – judge of appeal

=== Education ===
- Tan Cheng Han, S.C. – former dean and head, Faculty of Law, National University of Singapore
- Tan Chorh Chuan – Chief Health Scientist, Ministry of Health (MOH) and executive director of the new Office for Healthcare Transformation (from Jan 2018); former president, National University of Singapore (NUS)

=== Religious Organisation ===
- Lawrence Khong – Senior Pastor of Faith Community Baptist Church

== See also ==
- Former Saint Joseph's Institution
- Father Jean-Marie Beurel
- Catholic education in Singapore
- SJI International
