= Enrique Fuentes =

Austrian painter, born in Mexico

Enrique Fuentes

Enrique Fuentes Avila (born in Mexico) is an Austrian painter. He lives and works in Vienna and Berlin.

== Life ==
Enrique Fuentes grew up in Mexico until he travelled to Europe in 1998, aged 17, and settled down in Paris. From 1999 to 2000, he attended the École nationale supérieure d’arts in Paris Cergy. In 2001, he was accepted at the École nationale supérieure des beaux-arts in Paris where he studied in the master class of Jean-Michel Alberola until 2007. From 2004 to 2005, he interrupted his studies in France for an artistic residency in Tokyo during which he dedicated himself to calligraphy and graphic art In 2006, he attended the Salzburg Summer Academy of Arts under Guillaume Bijl. From 2008 until 2009, he completed a “Post-Diplôme” programme at the École nationale supérieure des beaux-arts in Paris. From 2005 until 2011, he worked as personal assistant to the Austrian painter Arnulf Rainer at the latter’s studio on Tenerife.

In 2009, Fuentes married Clara Rainer, Arnulf Rainer’s daughter; the marriage lasted until 2011. During the following years, Fuentes worked with Austrian action artist Günter Brus. The results from that collaboration were presented at numerous exhibitions. Since 2010, Enrique Fuentes has been living in Vienna and Berlin; in 2022, he was granted Austrian citizenship. His art is presented in galleries and museums in Austria, Germany, France, Spain, and Mexico. In 2019 and 2020, three museums in San Luis Potosí (Mexico) dedicated a comprehensive retrospective to him, honouring his 40th birthday, which coincided with his 20th artist anniversary; the retrospective was titled “40° 20’ Enrique Fuentes”.

== Work ==
Enrique Fuentes, Via Crucis – Die Auferstehung (the Resurrection), 2022, 900 × 400 cm, oil, pigment and dispersion paint on canvas, St. Stephen’s Cathedral, Vienna

Fuentes engages regularly with literature, poetry, history, and music and incorporates this engagement in his creative process. His works appear to be abstract; however, he describes them as narrations in which he deals with various subject matters. He prefers to work in large formats, painting with a brush or using his bare hands, or he pours the paint directly unto the support, thus creating expressive imagery

At the beginning of his artistic career, he was influenced by American Abstract Expressionism. During his study years, French art became another influence. Later, engaging with Austrian artists Arnulf Rainer and Günter Brus became formative for his further artistic development. Together with Brus, a proponent of Viennese Actionism, Fuentes created graphic cycles such as “Catrina die Große” (Catrina the Great) and “Goya”, among other pieces.

In 2020, Fuentes created the logo of the campaign “Kunst und Sport gegen Rassismus” (arts and sports against racism) of the Antidiskriminierungsstelle Steiermark (Styrian anti-discrimination office). His wing design was printed on sports jerseys to make a mark against racism and discrimination; it was worn especially by children‘s and adolescents‘ football teams but also by Austrian celebrities.

In 2022, Fuentes created the cycle “Via Crucis”, Stations of the Cross, the final station being the oil painting “Die Auferstehung” (the Resurrection) measuring nine by four meters. The hexapartite, monumental work was exhibited in the Stephansdom (St. Stephen’s Cathedral) in Vienna where it obscured the main altar during Advent 2022

== Exhibitions ==
=== Solo shows (selection) ===
Sources:

- 2026 Enrique Fuentes. Cooperari, galerie art moments, Vienna, Austria
- 2025 Tide - Gezeiten, Schütz Art Museum, Engelhartszell, Austria
- 2024 Enrique Fuentes, Château de Monboucher, Lamonzie-Saint-Martin, France
- 2023 The Forest – Monboucher, Galeria HMH, Port d’Andratx, Spain
- 2022 Enrique Fuentes: Via Crucis, Stephansdom (St. Stephen’s Cathedral), Vienna, Austria
- 2022 Requiem II, galerie art moments, Vienna, Austria
- 2021 Cosmos, galerie art moments, Graz, Austria
- 2019 Enrique Fuentes. 40° 20‘ Latitud, Museo Centenario, San Luis Potosí, Mexico
- 2019 Nueva Lotería Mexicana, Museo Francisco Cossío, San Luis Potosí, Mexico
- 2019 Enrique Fuentes. Piezas del Mes, Museo de Arte Contemporáneo MAC, San Luis Potosí, Mexico
- 2018 Atlas Obscuro, Novomatic Forum in cooperation with galerie art moments, Vienna, Austria
- 2018 Aaren-Klonrotor, Museum Leonora Carrington, San Luis Potosí, Mexico, Austria
- 2015 Die Blumen des Bösen/Las flores del mal, Mexikanisches Kulturinstitut in Wien/Instituto Cultural de Mexico en Viena, Vienna, Austria
- 2015 Nueva Lotería Mexicana, La maestranza, Villa de la paz, San Luis Potosí, Mexico
- 2014 Der Tod ist ein Hysteriker (death is a hysteric) – Fuentes/Brus, Galerie Trapp, Salzburg, Austria
- 2013 Etwas Unmenschliches (something inhuman), Kunsthaus Weiz, Weiz, Austria
- 2012 Einheit der Zwietracht (unity of discord) – Enrique Fuentes/Günter Brus, Galerie Gölles, Fürstenfeld, Austria
- 2011 Dunkle Energie (dark energy) – Enrique Fuentes/Günter Brus, Galerie Kunst & Handel, Graz, Austria
- 2010 Schlafwandeln (sleepwalking), Galerie Ulysses, Vienna, Austria
- 2009 Variaciones (variations), Museo de Arte, Santiago de Querétaro, Mexico
- 2008 Instante cualquiera (any moment), Museo de Aguascalientes, Aguascalientes, Mexico
- 2007 Intervalo (interval), Museo Francisco Cossío, San Luis Potosí, Mexico

=== Group shows (selection) ===
Sources:

- 2026 Exposición Colectiva de Collage (collective collage exhibition), Museo Vizcaínas, Mexico City, Mexico
- 2025 Gott und Geld (God and money), Museum Stift Klosterneuburg (Klosterneuburg monastry museum), Klosterneuburg, Austria
- 2021 TR3INTA Y S6IS, Museo de Arte Contemporáneo de San Luis Potosí, Mexico
- 2019 Günter Brus & Enrique Fuentes – „Todschwarze Aufzeichnungen“ (death-black notes), Hofgalerie Steiermarkhof, Graz, Austria
- 2017 Art on Paper, Kunsthaus Weiz, Weiz, Austria
- 2015 Compassion, Künstlerhaus Bethanien, Berlin, Germany
- 2015 Koschatzky Award, MUMOK, Vienna, Austria
- 2013 Catrina die Große (Catrina the Great), Galerie Sommer, Graz, Austria
- 2012 Zusammenwerken – Zusammenwirken. Gemeinschaftsarbeiten von Günter Brus mit Künstlerfreunden seit 1970 (collaboration – interaction. Works created by Günter Brus together with artist friends since 1970), Neue Galerie Graz, Graz, Austria
- 2009 Jadite Gallery, New York, USA

== Works in collections and museums ==
- Museo de Arte Contemporáneo, San Luis Potosí, Mexico
- Schütz Art Museum, Engelhartszell, Austria
- Chateau de Monboucher, France

== Literature ==
- Enrique Fuentes & Marion Fischer (2023): Via Crucis. art moments. ISBN 978-3-200-09012-5
- Antonio García Acosta (Ed.) (2020). 40° 20‘ Enrique Fuentes. Veinte años de trayectoría. Gobierno del Estado de San Luis Potosí, Secretaría de la Cultura de San Luis Potosí, Centro de las Artes de San Luis Potosí, Museo Leonora Carrington San Luis Potosí, San Luis Potosí: Colección Panoptilon. With essays by Eudoro Fonseca Yerena, Antonio García Acosta, Silvia del Carmen Rodríguez Solís, Ofelia Zacarías Díaz Infante, Aldo Arellano Paredes, David Eduardo Vázquez Salguero, Nikolaus Schaffer, Laure Jaumoillé, Walter Kratner, Günter Brus, Florian Steininger.
- Johann Baumgartner (Ed.) (2019). Todschwarze Aufzeichnungen. Günter Brus - Enrique Fuentes. Steiermarkhof - das Kultur- und Bildungszentrum der Landwirtschaftskammer Steiermark. ISBN 978-3-9504724-3-1
- Enrique Fuentes & Marion Fischer (2018). Atlas obscuro. Novomatic Forum. ISBN 978-3-200-05589-6

== Videos ==
- Atelierbesuch bei Enrique Fuentes (a visit to the studio of Enrique Fuentes), Art News Portrait, written by Patrick Schuster, directed by Osama Rasheed
- Enrique Fuentes „Via Crucis – Der Kreuzweg“, Stephansdom/St. Stephen’s Cathedral, Vienna
- Interview with Enrique Fuentes on the occasion of the Latitudes 40° 20‘ exhibitions in San Luis Potosí, Mexico, CRM Noticias
