= Titarubi =

Indonesian artist (born 1968)

- Born: Rubiati Puspitasari; 1968; Bandung
- Education: Bandung Institute of Technology

Titarubi (born 1968) is an Indonesian artist. She is based in Yogyakarta and is one of Indonesia's most prominent contemporary artists.

== Biography ==
Titarubi began making art while studying ceramics at Bandung Institute of Technology in 1988.

She is heavily involved in social movements. She was very active in fight against the Bill against Pornography and Pornoaction, and produced Surrounding David, a gigantic replica of Michelangelo's David with the body covered by red lace brocade. Titarubi created the Vagina Brocade in Opera Jawa, symbolising both a vagina and a blazing fire. She is the director and founder of Indonesian Contemporary Art Network (iCAN). Titarubi has exhibited at the Venice Biennale, the Singapore Art Museum, the Singapore Biennale, the ZKM Center for Art and Media Karlsruhe, the Museum and Art Gallery of the Northern Territory, the Busan Biennale, the Museo d'Arte Contemporanea Donnaregina, and the Govett-Brewster Art Gallery.
