= Bolun Shen =

Chinese artist

- Born: China
- Known for: Performance, Activism
- Website: shenbolun.art

Bolun Shen is an artist from China, known performance art and socially engaged practice. His work engages themes of civic participation, public speech, and political procedure through various textual forms, including dialogues, debates, and public speeches.

He has been an artist-in-residence in the US, Europe and so on. He is also a frequent public speaker, having delivered several TEDx talks in China.

== Education and early career ==
Bolun was raised in Shanghai and Beijing and lived for a short period in North America. He graduated from the Communication University of China with a degree in communication. He subsequently transitioned from Journalism into documentary filmmaking and began exploring multidisciplinary artistic practices.

== Works ==
=== Theatre and performance ===
- Would you allow me to be Swiss? (2022): A theatrical work exploring Swiss immigration and direct democracy, inspired by the 1978 film The Swissmakers. Created during a Pro Helvetia residency at Kaserne Basel, the performance features a fictional citizenship hearing where the audience votes on the performer's naturalization.
- The Colosseum: An interactive project consisting of improvised debates and deliberations among audience members. The work examines voting systems and authority management without a script or professional actors. It has been staged eight times in Beijing.
- Where Is My Water?: First presented at the Shanghai Ming Contemporary Art Museum (McaM) in 2018 and later at the Wuzhen Theatre Festival in 2019. The performance involves actors in a glass enclosure designed as a fish tank, exploring interpersonal dynamics and institutional observation.
- See You in My Dreams: A collaborative series between artists in Beijing and Detroit. The project features digitally connected sessions where participants read news propaganda from their respective countries to each other as bedtime stories.
- The Petition of Nothing is a social performance work, developed in 2026 during a residency at MacDowell in Peterborough, New Hampshire. The project consisted of submitting a petitioned warrant article to the town meeting proposing a two-minute moment of collective silence during the deliberative session in April. Intervening as a Chinese within a system of American direct democracy, the proposal did not seek policy change or funding but functioned as a symbolic insertion into the formal procedures of New England town governance. The work examined questions of participation, legitimacy, and non-resident civic presence, and has been described as a reflection on the contemporary condition of democracy in both American and global contexts.

=== Independent Film ===
Bolun appeared on stage in As Autumn Draws Near in 2022.

=== Artivism ===
- Action in Action: In 2023, Bolun began working on the video activism project Action in Action, which was released on Chinese video platforms. Less than a year later, the account was banned, and the videos were taken down. However, they remain available on YouTube.
- Action Office: is a fictitious collective name adopted by Bolun beginning in 2024 for a series of works engaging real-world political contexts. One of these projects, Future Vote, was initiated in China in 2024 and involved an auction-based participatory format in which participants wrote down a future year; these written projections were subsequently treated as speculative commodities and circulated as part of a structured commercial and game-like exchange. On January 13, 2024, the day of the Taiwan presidential election, Action Office organized an auction of nine such “futures” in mainland China. Bolun was later detained by Chinese authorities for 38 days in connection with the project. In 2024, during his artist residency program at Singapore Art Museum, Bolun released the work of PoCard under Action Office in the open studio addressing contemporary political themes in Singapore.
- Babel Tower was a sculpture project in collaboration with Greenpeace Beijing Office, made of discarded mobile phones and shaped like a cell tower, to highlight the problem of electronic waste. It was displayed in a shopping mall.

=== Documentary ===
Bolun spent approximately eighteen months filming questions posed by 1,000 young people in ten cities across China. An exhibition based on this material was presented domestically and was shown internationally in 2015 at the Helsinki Art Festival. The project prompted public discussion regarding documentary and performance project in shared spaces and the education system.

== Crowdfunding campaign ==
Bolun and his former partner Wu Xia had a daughter while unmarried. They were informed that, under the family planning regulations then in effect, a Social Maintenance Fee of 40,000 yuan would be imposed. TIn response, they launched a crowdfunding campaign on Dreamore.com, which drew public attention and discussion regarding state involvement in reproductive policy. The campaign was subsequently removed from the platform, reportedly under official pressure, and related posts were deleted from WeChat.

== Residencies ==
- Singapore Art Museum, 2024
- By Art Matters天目里美术馆, 2022
- Pro Helvetia, Basel, 2022
- MacDowell Fellowship, 2025/2026

== Speeches ==
- TEDxChengdu Edu, 2019
- TEDxTHU, 2018
- TEDxRUC, 2013
