= SAM at 8Q =

Annexe of Singapore Art Museum

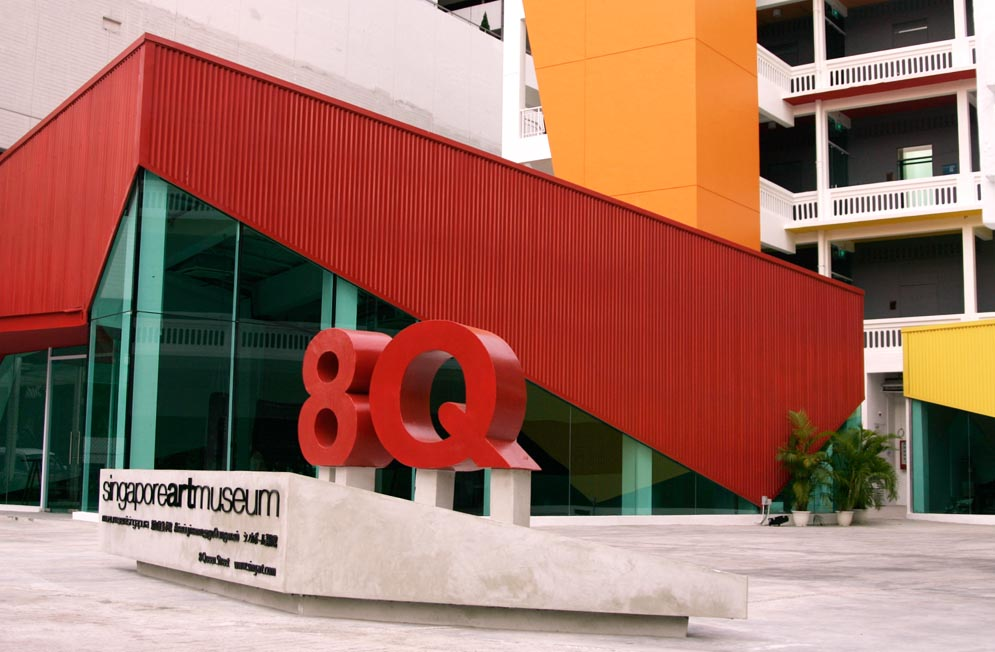
- Facade of SAM at 8Q, the former Catholic High School. Image courtesy of SAM.

- Location in Singapore
- Established: 15 August 2008; 18 years ago
- Dissolved: August 2019; 7 years ago
- Location: 8 Queen Street, Singapore 188535
- Coordinates: 1°17′48″N 103°51′5″E
- Type: Contemporary art
- Public transit access: CC2 Bras Basah
- Website: www.singaporeartmuseum.sg

SAM at 8Q was the annexe of Singapore Art Museum - Singapore's contemporary art museum. Located at the heart of the city, it derived its name from the museum's location at No. 8 Queen Street near Bras Basah Road. SAM at 8Q is also approximately 88 steps away from Singapore Art Museum.

== History ==
The 4-storey building was formerly the primary school wing of the Catholic High School. When the School relocated to their current location in 1987, the 3,500 m^{2} (38,000 sq ft) space gave home to the Kum Yan Cantonese Methodist Church. In September 2007, the Church ended its tenancy and the building was repossessed by the Singapore Land Authority.

== Launch ==
With new interest on contemporary art by the young, the National Heritage Board (NHB) took up tenancy of the building from the Land Authority. The Board also spent $5.8 million on renovations, and converted the classrooms in the 4-storey building into six galleries to showcase contemporary installation works, video and photography installation, performance art and sound art. A lift was also installed, and the galleries, staircases and parts of corridors have also been air-conditioned and humidity-controlled. There are also spaces to house two restaurants on the ground floor which are currently occupied by Love Pal Cafe and Standing Sushi Bar.

SAM at 8Q was officially opened on 15 August 2008 with an inaugural 8-man art exhibition titled 8Q-Rate: School; a name pun from the word 'curate'. 8Q-Rate featured the works by young contemporary artists such as Jahan Loh, Donna Ong, Grace Tan, Chong Li Chuan, Jason Wee, Tan Kai Syng, Phunk and sculptor Ahmad Abu Bakar.

== Closure ==
In August 2019, SAM at 8Q closed for redevelopment. The reopening date was delayed from 2021 to 2023 to 2026, when it was announced that SAM would not return to Bras Basah but remain at its outpost in Tanjong Pagar Distripark, which opened in 2022.

== Location and facilities ==
Situated in the centre of Singapore's major shopping district and Waterloo Street Arts Belt, SAM and SAM at 8Q were located alongside Singapore's major performing arts and visual arts institutions: such as the Nanyang Academy of Fine Art, LaSalle College of the Arts, the Stamford Arts Centre, the Selegie Arts Centre, Singapore Calligraphy Centre, YMS Arts Centre, Dance Ensemble Singapore, Sculpture Square and Action Theatre as well as the School of the Arts: an institution that offers an integrated arts and academic curriculum for youths aged 13 to 18 years of age.

SAM at 8Q was accessible by major public transportation systems such as the public buses, the Mass Rapid Transit (MRT) lines and cab services. The nearest MRT station was Brash Basah on the Circle Line.

== See also ==
- Singapore Art Museum

== Gallery ==
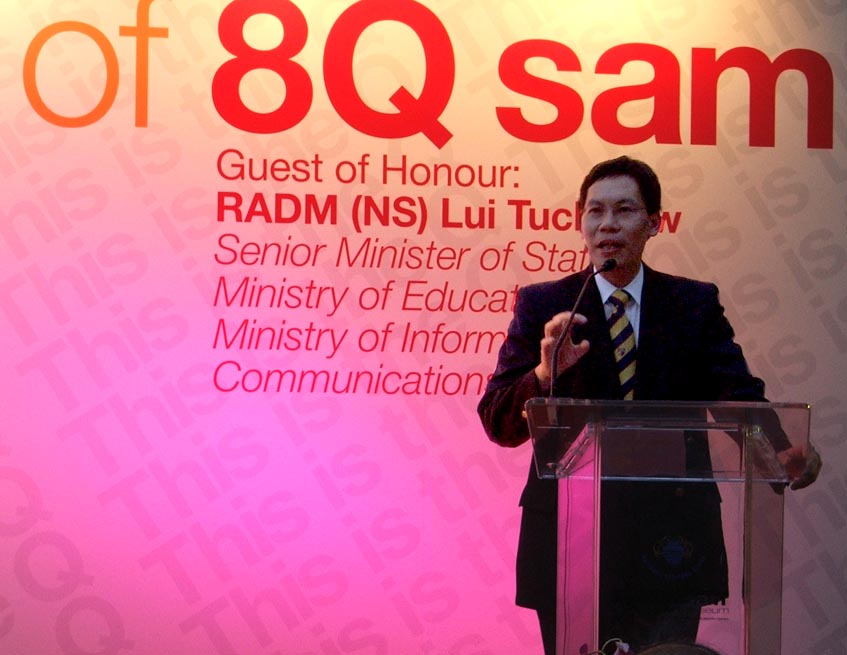
Senior Minister Of State Lui Tuck Yew delivering his speech at the official launch of 8Q sam.

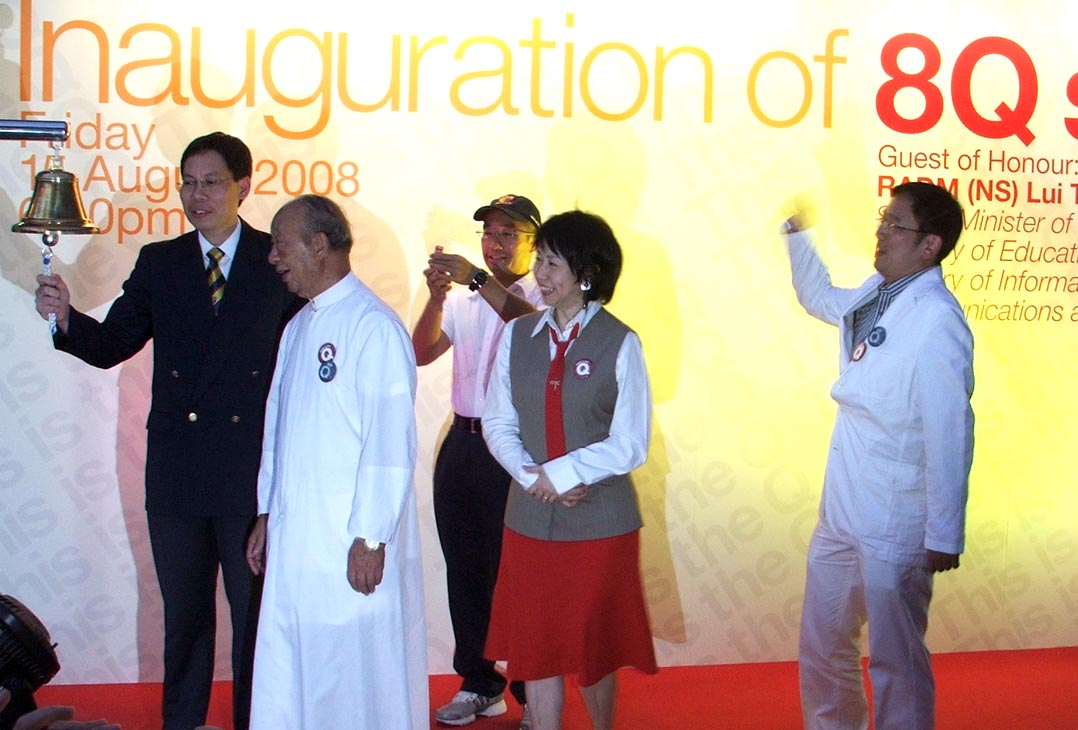
Senior Minister Of State Lui Tuck Yew rings the school bell to mark the official opening of the new museum.

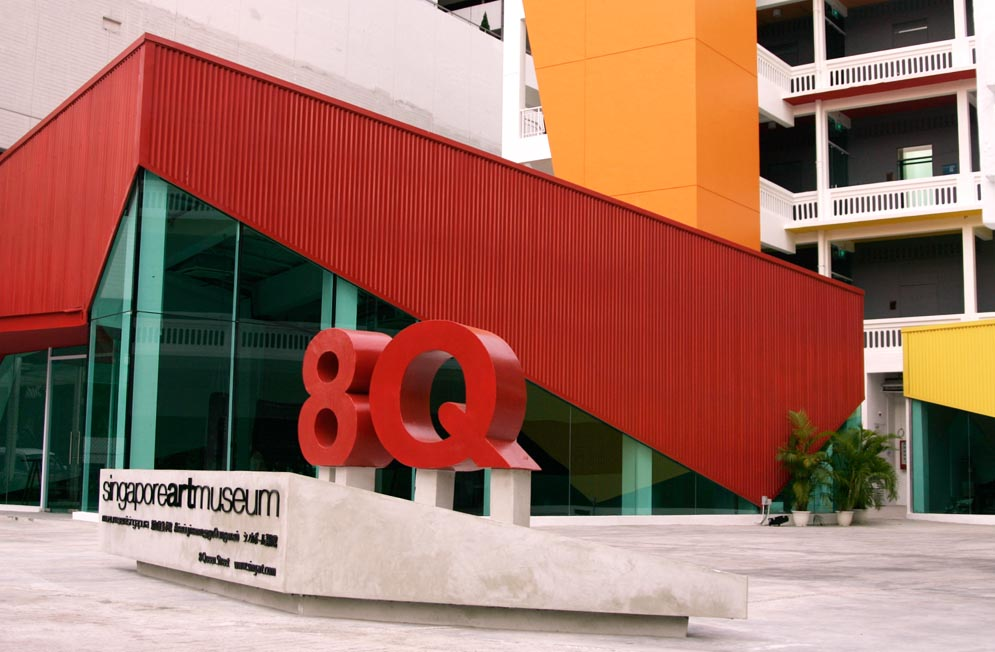
Glass hall of SAM at 8Q, on the left of the open space, formerly the Catholic school quadrangle
