= SJI International School =

St. Joseph's Institution International
- 圣若瑟国际书院 (Shèng Ruò Sè Guó Jì Shū Yuàn); Institusi Internasional Saint Joseph செய்ண்ட் ஜோசஃப் கல்வி நிலையம் சர்வதேச பள்ளி
- 490 Thomson Road; Singapore 298191; 1°19′57″N 103°50′28″E; Entrance via 19 Toa Payoh West; Singapore 318876

Information
- Type: Lasallian Catholic international school
- Motto: Enter to Learn, Leave to Serve
- Established: 2006; 20 years ago
- Principal: Bradley Bird (High School); Catherine Nicol (Elementary School)
- Enrolment: Approx. 1,700
- Colours: Green, White
- Website: https://www.sji-international.com.sg/

St. Joseph's Institution International (often referred to as "SJI International" or "SJII") is an independent co-educational Lasallian Catholic international school at Thomson Road in Novena, Singapore. It comprises an elementary and high school. The elementary school students range in age from 5 to 12 while in the High School the students are aged 12–18. The high school was founded in 2007 and the elementary school opened in 2008.

In 2024, SJI International added early childhood education to their educational offerings, with the opening of SJI International Preschool (formerly Maris Stella Kindergarten) at Holland Road.

The elementary school teaches the International Primary Curriculum (IPC), which is used by over 1,000 schools in 65 countries around the world. Singapore maths and Chinese are also included in the curriculum as Chinese is part of the fabric of the school culture. Spanish is offered in Grades 5 and 6.

The High School caters to both local and foreign students from Grades 7 to 12. The school offers the IGCSE programme from Grades 7 to 10, and the International Baccalaureate Diploma Programme for Grades 11 and 12. The first cohort of students graduated in 2009.

== History ==
In 2006, upon the urging of Singapore's Economic Development Board, St Joseph's Institution established an international school. SJI International High School began classes in January 2007 with 104 students. In January 2012, SJI International welcomed around 700 students from grade 7 to grade 12, a 600% increase in enrolment in five years. Numbers have continued to grow to the current (2024) High School enrolment of 1,208, and 765 in the Elementary School.

SJI International High School was the third "local international" school to open in Singapore (i.e. a school which can admit both local and international students at secondary and pre-university levels) after Anglo-Chinese School (International) and Hwa Chong International School (both of which were also established by well-known local schools). It is open to both Singaporean and international students from the age of 12. The student population is 63% Singaporean, while 39 other nationalities comprise the remaining 37%. In addition, the school reports that 26% of students are catholic.

In adherence to government regulations, Elementary School enrolment is currently closed to Singapore citizens but open to all foreign students, provided the child holds a valid Dependent’s Pass (tied to the parent’s Employment Pass), Singapore Permanent Residency (Entry/Re -Entry Permit), or Immigration Exemption Order (for diplomats). However, there are no such restrictions for High School enrolment.

=== Association with St Joseph's Institution ===
SJI International School is part of a group of seven Lasallian schools in Singapore whose history dates back over 150 years. Together, the Elementary and High School form the group's first international school. The School is a non-profit organisation and is overseen by the SJI International School Board, composed of SJI alumnae. The School is currently supported by a Brother President and two Lasallian Brothers on the teaching staff.

== Maldives death incident ==
On 8 November 2024, 15-year-old British-Singaporean Jenna Chan died during a National Youth Achievement Award (NYAA) expedition in the Maldives. The expedition was mandatory for all Grade 9 students. She had been hit by a boat propellor while on a snorkelling trip near Dhigurah Island in the Alifu Dhaalu Atoll that was conducted by the Maldives Whale Shark Research Programme (MWSRP). She was taken to Dhigurah Health Centre but was pronounced dead on arrival.

In July 2025, the Ministry of Education (MOE) reported that they would not be investigating SJII as it was satisfied that the school's overseas trip safety processes had been followed.

On 20 July 2026, Chen's parents sued SJII alleging they had failed to assess the safety of the destination adequately, properly vet MWSRP as a provider for schoolchildren, ensure suitable supervision during the excursion, and verify that marine activities were conducted under safe conditions. They also alleged that SJII had withheld information about the trip.

== Affiliated schools ==
- St. Joseph's Institution
