= Andres Barrioquinto =

Filipino artist

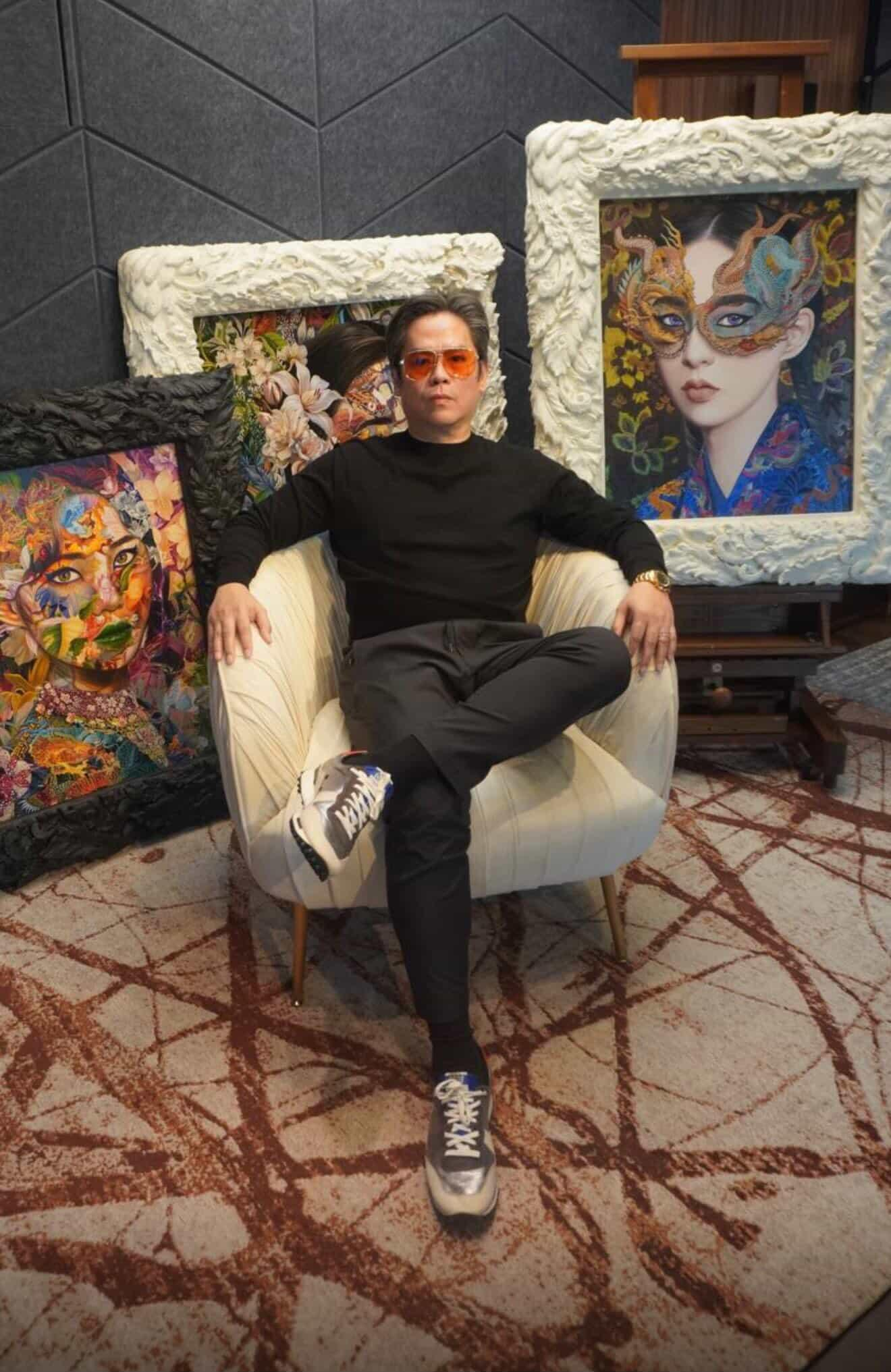
- Born: April 6, 1975 (age 51); Manila, Philippines
- Known for: Painting

Andres Barrioquinto (born April 6, 1975) is a Filipino artist known for his surrealistic portraits that combines elements deriving from the iconography and aesthetic of Baroque with Japanese woodcuts (ukiyo-e), reinterpreted into a Pop style.

In his paintings, men, women, and anthropomorphic animals are shown in forests plentiful with butterflies and birds, introducing the theme of vanitas in a context of strong visual impact.

In 2016, he had his first solo exhibit in London, It Will All End in Tears at the StART Art Fair with Saatchi Gallery. He returns in again in the same venue in 2019 with another exhibition, This is My Beautiful Title.

In 2018, he showed Portraits, a special exhibition at the National Museum, featuring contemporary depictions of the Philippine's most influential faces: Ben Chan, Baby Fores, Josie Natori, and Bea Zobel to name a few.

In 2022, Rizzoli New York published a comprehensive monograph on the life and career of the Filipino artist Andres Barrioquinto. It contains essays from renowned art critics and curators Demetrio Paparoni, Patrick Flores, and Ricky Francisco.

Barrioquinto also operates under the pseudonym Genius B.O.R.T.A. where he explores the genre experimentations evident in his earlier body of work. It is within this conceptual framework that his #ootd series emerged, a recurring character that examines the concept of a curated life in the age of social media.

== Early life and education ==
Barrioquinto was born April 6, 1975 Manila but lived throughout many places due to his father's job of writing and editing. He spent many of his teenage years in Hong Kong, studying at Royden House School. After his studies, he went back to Manila to get a college education. In Manila, he studied as a Fine Arts major in painting at the University of Santo Tomas in 2000.

== Awards and recognition ==
In 1998, Barrioquinto won Grand Prize in the Oil Painting category at the 15th Metrobank Foundation Young Painters' Annual National Painting Competition.

In 1999, was the first Filipino to win in the Taiwan Biennial.

Barrioquinto has received various awards and recognitions such as the Metrobank Foundation's Aces Award for Continuing Excellence (2009), Cultural Center of the Philippines’ Thirteen Artist's award in 2003, and a back-to-back recipient of the UST Benavidez Awards in 1999 and 2000. He then had 19 solo exhibitions in the Philippines and 5 in Singapore. Some of his works can be seen in the Singapore Art Museum.

In 2019, he was named one of PeopleAsia magazine's People of the Year.

In 2021, he was included in Lifestyle Asia's The List. In that same year, he was also included in Tatler Asia's Most Influential PH list.

In 2022, he was again included in Tatler Asia's Most Influential PH list.

In 2023, for the third consecutive time, he was again included in Tatler Asia's Most Influential PH list.
