= Rudy Mosbergen =

Singaporean field hockey player

Personal information
- Full name: Rudolf William Mosbergen
- Nationality: Singaporean
- Born: 8 April 1929 Singapore
- Died: 22 February 2015 (aged 85) Singapore

Sport
- Sport: Field hockey
- Club: Singapore Recreation Club, Singapore

Rudolf William Mosbergen (8 April 1929 – 22 February 2015) was a Singaporean field hockey player and educator. He competed in the men's tournament at the 1956 Summer Olympics.

He studied at St Joseph's Institution and graduated with the Class of 1948. He was the founding principal of Raffles Junior College (1982-1987).
