= Mykita =

German eyewear manufacturer

MYKITA
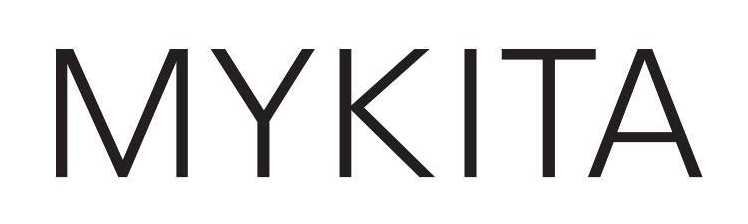
- Type: GmbH
- Founded: 2003
- Founders: Harald Gottschling, Daniel Haffmans, Philipp Haffmans, Moritz Krüger
- Headquarters: Berlin, Germany
- Key people: Moritz Krüger, CEO and Creative Director
- Products: Eyewear and sunglasses
- Revenue: 28 Mio. EUR (2014)
- Number of employees: 251 (2014)
- Website: mykita.com/en

MYKITA GmbH is a high-end eyewear design manufacturer based in Berlin, Germany, known internationally for its handcrafted eyeglasses and sunglasses.

== Company ==
The company was founded by Harald Gottschling, Daniel Haffmans, Philipp Haffmans and Moritz Krüger in 2003. All of its products are hand-assembled in their manufactory, often referred to as Mykita Haus, in Berlin. In 2006, Mykita moved to Brunnenstraße in the Mitte district where the manufactory was based for another eight years before moving the current headquarters to the historical Pelikan-Haus in Berlin, Kreuzberg, in 2014. The name MYKITA is derived from "Kita" (a common abbreviation for Kindertagesstätte) and is a reference to the firm's first premises in a former day nursery.

In 2015, Harald Gottschling, Daniel Haffmans and Philipp Haffmans announced their resignation from the company, leaving Krüger as CEO and Creative Director.

In 2024, LVMH’s eyewear entity Thélios took a minority stake in Mykita.

== Products ==
In 2004, Mykita launched its first metal-frame collection, Collection No1. The frames are made from stainless steel and feature a patented hingeless design with no screws or welded joints.

Collection No2, launched soon afterwards, comprises acetate frames and includes both prescription models and sunglasses. The Lite, Decades and Luxe lines were then also added to the product range. The Lite collection comprises the company's lightest models, which have an ultra-thin frame comprising just three parts. The Decades collection is based on spectacles forms from various eras of the 20th century. Luxe has an emphasis on naturally sourced materials.

In 2010, Mykita introduced MYLON, a new material based on polyamide and a first in the eyewear industry. The selective laser sintering (SLS) technique is used to make frames individually and without form-related restrictions. The entire production process is zero waste, with any unused powder being recycled for subsequent use. According to the manufacturer, MYLON provides a wide range of design options thanks to its lightness; in addition, the material's thermal adaptability means the frames are fully adjustable. The first MYLON collection was premiered at the Silmo eyewear fair in September 2011.

== Awards ==
2010 Red Dot Design Award – Honorable Mention – (Collection Nr. 2: Dries black) Red Dot Design Award – Won – (Collection Nr. 1 / Lite: Oda glossy gold) iF Product Design Award – Won – (Collection Nr. 2: Dries topaz)

2011 iF Material Award – Won – (Mylon)

2012 Red Dot Design Award – Won - Communication Design 2012 - Editorial & Corporate Publishing – (MYKITA Book 8)

2013 German Design Award - Won - (MYKITA LITE HAAKON)

2015 - 2016 Iron Design Award - Won - MYKITA / Damir Doma: MADELEINE Sunglasses

== Collaborations ==
In 2009 Mykita and German fashion designer Bernhard Willhelm launched a jointly developed eyewear collection. The mirrored sunglasses model ”Franz” from this collection enjoyed international media attention after being worn by actress Sarah Jessica Parker in the movie Sex and the City 2. Further artists and fashion designers that Mykita have worked with include Moncler, Romain Kremer, Marios Schwab, and Alexandre Herchcovitch.

In March 2020, Mykita collaborated with camera manufacturer Leica on a sunglasses collection.

In April 2025, Mykita collaborated with German luggage manufacturer Rimowa on a collection of limited-edition eyewear.

== MYKITA Shops ==
Mykita has 12 international retail locations, including Berlin, Cartagena, Copenhagen, Los Angeles, Monterrey, New York City, Paris, Tokyo, Osaka, Vienna, Washington DC, Zermatt and Zurich.
