= Natee Utarit =

Thai artist (born 1970)

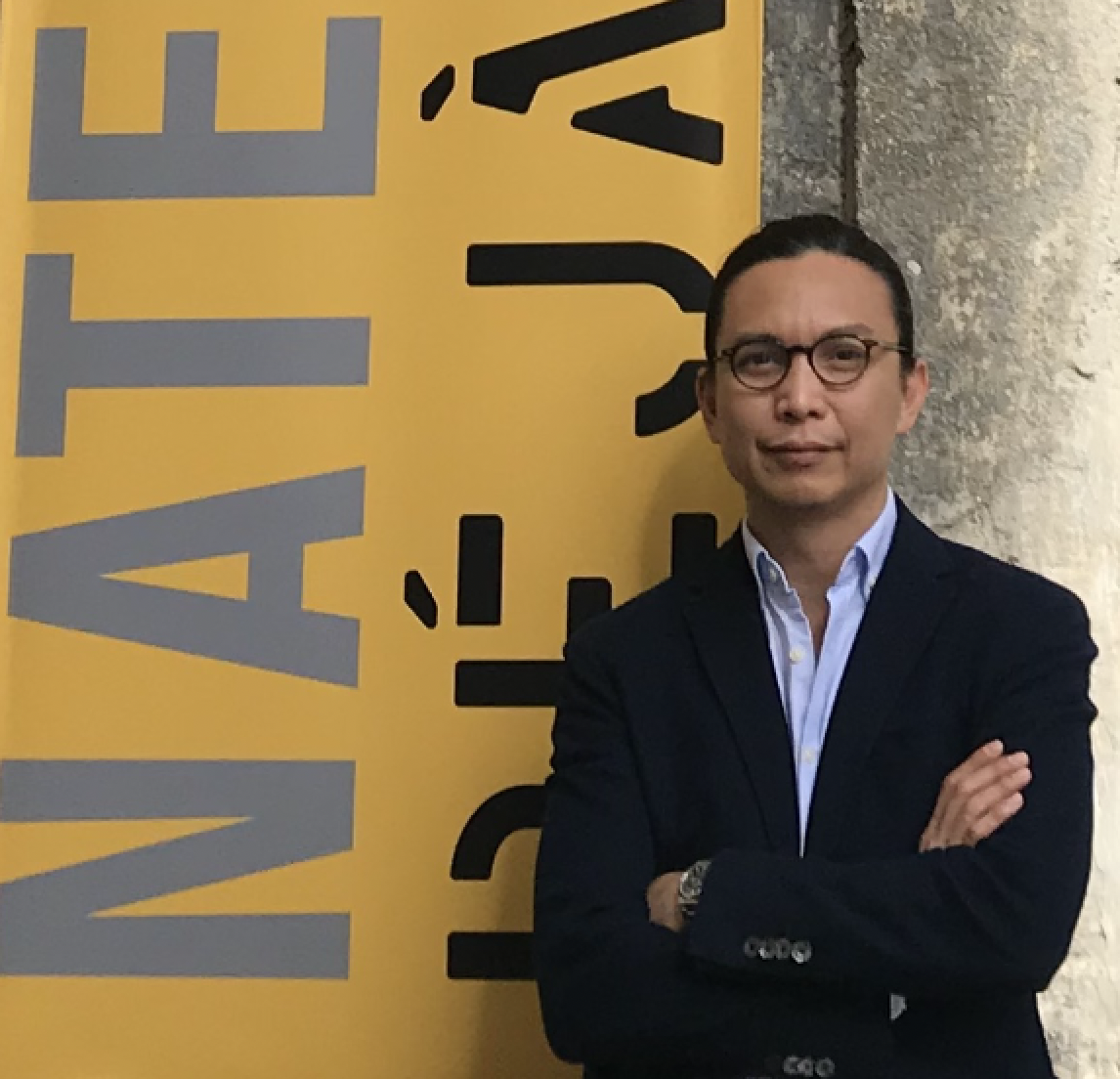
- Born: 9 April 1970 (age 56)
- Education: University of Silpakorn
- Occupation: Artist

Natee Utarit (Thai: นที อุตฤทธิ์, born 9 April 1970) is a contemporary artist from Bangkok, Thailand. He has participated in group and several solo exhibitions in East Asia and Europe.

Utarit's artworks have been described as involving the relationships between historical arts such as Renaissance art from the Western world and postcolonialism.

Commentators state that Utarit questions the world of contemporary art through his aesthetics skills, creating metaphors on all his artworks.

== Biography ==
Natee Utarit was born in 1970 in Bangkok. He graduated from Silpakorn University majoring in Graphic Arts (Fine Arts) at the Painting and Sculpture Faculty.

Utarit has received the Art Game Changer Award from Asia Society.

== Professional career and exhibitions ==
Natee's works have been described as a combination of philosophy, beliefs, religious views, history, knowledge of various elements from various centuries, and experimentation (on connecting between his artworks and historical cultures from the Western world). The artist also uses photographs as a communication tool, creating a visionary view presenting cultures and an informative background on the relationships between Western and Eastern cultures, respectively.

According to one analysis, Natee's works can be regarded as finding newer perspective by creating a figurative which differs from the original / tradition views. With that, the artist's use of sociopolitical and religious points of view to craft up his works of art, reflecting both contemporary points of view and hidden messages for the audience to comprehends through various visuals and forms.

Natee's works include "Optimism is Ridiculous: The Altarpieces", from solo exhibitions in both museums and art institutions.

== Bibliography ==
- Natee Utarit: Optimism is Ridiculous" by Demetrio Paparoni 2018
- Natee Utarit: After Painting"written by Singapore Art Museum 2010
- Natee Utarit: Illustration of the Crisis" published by Richard Koh Fine Arts 2013.

== Selected solo and group exhibitions ==
Year	Exhibition
1991	The Small Prints by 10 Artists, River City Gallery, Bangkok, Thailand.
1991	Spiritual Sense, 2 Artists Exhibition of Prints, British Council Gallery, Bangkok, Thailand.
1991	Small Work, Group Show by 3 Artists, The Seven Seas Gallery, Bangkok, Thailand.
1992	The Exhibition of Prints, Dialogue Gallery, Bangkok, Thailand.
1992	Small Work, An Art Exhibition by 56 Thai Artists, Silom Art Space, Bangkok, Thailand.
1993	Life Now, 3 Artists Exhibition, Dialogue Gallery, Bangkok, Thailand.
1994	Anthropology, The Bangkok Playhouse, Bangkok, Thailand.
1995	Drawing and Watercolors, British Council Gallery, Bangkok, Thailand.
1996	Hidden Agenda, Project 304, Bangkok, Thailand.
1997	Mother Figure, Numthong Gallery, Bangkok, Thailand.
1997	Conversing Contemporary, Numthong Gallery, Bangkok, Thailand.
1998	Internal Landscape, Numthong Gallery, Bangkok, Thailand.
1998	Book, Kurusapa Building, Bangkok. – Bangkok Art Project 1998, Public Art in Community lives across the Rattanakosin Island, Bangkok, Thailand.
1998	Portrait, Numthong Gallery, Bangkok, Thailand.
1999	Appearance and Reality, Numthong Gallery, Bangkok, Thailand.
1999	Internal Landscape, Art Forum, Singapore.
1999	Homage to Landscape Painting, Numthong Gallery, Bangkok, Thailand.
2000	Snapshot, Plum Blossoms Gallery, Singapore.
2001	Views and Transference, Numthong Gallery, Bangkok, Thailand.
2001	Equivalence Second Dialectic, Plum Blossoms Gallery, Singapore.
2001	Root, Open Art Space, Bangkok, Thailand.
2001	Thai Contemporary Exhibition, Valentine Willie Fine Art, Kuala Lumpur, Malaysia.
2001	Painted, Valentine Willie Fine Art, Kuala Lumpur, Malaysia.
2002	Painting with Pure Reason, Numthong Gallery, Bangkok, Thailand.
2002	Silent Laughing of Monster, Numthong Gallery, Bangkok, Thailand.
2002	Developing Time, Tadu Gallery, Bangkok, Thailand.
2003	Recent Paintings, Numthong Gallery, Bangkok, Thailand.
2003	Recent Paintings, Valentine Willie Fine Art, Kuala Lumpur, Malaysia.
2003	Still Pictures, Plum Blossoms Gallery, Singapore.
2005	Portrait, Valentine Willie Fine Art, Kuala Lumpur, Malaysia.
2005	The Last Description of the Old Romantic, Numthong Gallery, Bangkok, Thailand.
2005	Natee Utarit – Paintings by Natee Utarit, Richard Koh Fine Art, Kuala Lumpur, Malaysia.
2006	Signed and Dated, Valentine Willie Fine Art, Kuala Lumpur, Malaysia.
2006	Kyotek Sae-Wu's 12 photographs during 1969–1973, Numthong Gallery, Bangkok, Thailand.
2006	The Fragment and the Sublime, Valentine Willie Fine Art, Kuala Lumpur, Malaysia.
2007	The Amusement of Dreams, Hope and Perfection, Numthong Gallery, Bangkok, Thailand.
2008	Transparency Happiness, Soka Art Center, Beijing, China.
2008	Dreams, Hope and Perfection, Valentine Willie Fine Art, Kuala Lumpur, Malaysia.
2009	Natee Utarit – Tales of Yesterday, Today, and Tomorrow, Richard Koh Fine Art, Kuala Lumpur, Malaysia.
2011	Illustration of The Crisis, Art Season Gallery, Zurich, Switzerland.
2011	Bourgeois Dilemma, Finale Art File, Philippines.
2012	Illustration of the Crisis, ARNDT Berlin, Germany.
2013	Natee Utarit – Optimism is Ridiculous, Richard Koh Fine Art, Kuala Lumpur, Malaysia.
2013	Natee Utarit – Optimism is Ridiculous, Richard Koh Fine Art Singapore, Singapore.
2013	Natee Utarit – Optimism is Ridiculous at Hyundai Gallery, Hyundai Gallery, Seoul, Korea.
2016	Optimism is Ridiculous, Megumi Ogita Gallery, Tokyo, Japan.
2016	Samlee & Co., The Absolutely Fabulous Show, Art Stage Jakarta, Jakarta, Indonesia.
2017	Natee Utarit – Optimism is Ridiculous: THE ALTARPIECES, Ayala Museum, Makati City, Philippines.
2017	Natee Utarit – It Would be Silly to be Jealous of a Flower, Richard Koh Fine Art, Kuala Lumpur, Malaysia.
2017	Natee Utarit – Optimism is Ridiculous: The Altarpieces, National Gallery of Indonesia, Jakarta, Indonesia.
2017	It Would Be Silly to Be Jealous of a Flower, Richard Koh Fine Art, Kuala Lumpur, Malaysia.
2018	Natee Utarit – Optimism is Ridiculous: The Altarpieces, The Private Museum, Singapore.
2018	Untitled Poems Of Théodore Rousseau (in remembrance of Théodore Rousseau, "a man who is tormented by several devils"), THAI FOCUS, ART STAGE Singapore 2018, Singapore.
2018	Natee Utarit – Optimism is Ridiculous, National Art Gallery, Kuala Lumpur, Malaysia.
2018	Untitled Poems Of Théodore Rousseau, Tang Contemporary Art, Hong Kong.
2018	Natee Utarit – View From the Tower, Richard Koh Projects, Bangkok, Thailand.
2018	Untitled Poems Of Théodore Rousseau, Tang Contemporary Art, Bangkok, Thailand
2019	Your Past is My Future, Richard Koh Fine Art, Art Basel Hong Kong, Hong Kong.
2019	Natee Utarit & Anne Samat – Metafysica, Tønsberg, Norway.
2019	Natee Utarit – Déjà Vu, Made in Cloister, Curated by Demetrio Paparoni, Naples, Italy.
2020	Natee Utarit – Déjà Vu: Your Past is my Future, Richard Koh Fine Art, Singapore.

== Literature ==
- Natee Utarit: Optimism is Ridiculous (2017), ISBN 978-88-572-3787-9
- Natee Utarit: Illustration of the Crisis (2013), ISBN 9789-834-407-827
- Natee Utarit: After Painting (2010), ISBN 978-981-08-6692-1
