= Romain Kremer =

French fashion designer (born 1982)

- Born: 1 April 1982 (age 43); Villefranche de Rouergue, France
- Known for: fashion direction, fashion design, art direction
- Awards: 2005 Hyères
- Website: www.romainkremer.com

Romain Kremer (born 1 April 1982 in Villefranche de Rouergue, Aveyron, France) is a French fashion designer. He graduated from the Duperré School of Decorative Arts in Paris in 2002, and the following year he went to work for firms like Christian Dior Monsieur.

== Awards and distinctions ==
In 2005 he won the Special Award for Creativity at the 20th Hyères International Fashion & Photography Festival.

== Career ==
=== Multidisciplinary projects ===
==== Fondation Cartier ====
In 2005 he choreographed and directed an installation-performance for the Fondation Cartier's Nomadic Nights.

==== en:trance ====
In 2006, Romain Kremer took on a collaboration project with the choreographer Christian Rizzo. The project, dubbed en:trance, presented variations of workshops, conferences and exhibits and was a cooperation with the École nationale supérieure des Beaux-Arts, the Ecole nationale supérieure de création industrielle, the National Center for Visual Arts (Centre national des arts plastiques: CNAP) and the Centre National de la Danse.

==== Studio Harcourt ====
In 2010, the Parisian photo studio, Studio Harcourt, photographed Romain Kremer's collection archives. Followed by an expo "Retrospectrum" which opened in Paris on 27 June 2010, then continued on a tour of Europe's principal fashion capitals. The pictures were subsequently featured in "L'Art du portrait selon Studio Harcourt : Secrets et techniques", a book published by the Studio Harcourt in December 2010.

=== Fashion designer ===
==== Romain Kremer ====
In the wake of his Special Award for Creativity at Hyères, he launched, in 2005, his homonymous menswear brand. Notably presenting boys in sheer pink floor-length dresses for spring / summer 2009, it kept in with their masculinity. Often presenting futuristic and post-apocalyptic narratives to hard techno soundtracks, the New York Times stated that Romain Kremer knows how to create a fashion moment. The designer has been compared to Pierre Cardin on GQ magazine, undeniably due to his Space Age approach to contemporary menswear. Romain Kremer stopped his brand as he was called to join Thierry Mugler in 2010.

==== Mugler ====
Rosemary Rodriguez's departure as artistic director of the house of Thierry Mugler lands a triumvirate to the head of the Parisian house of couture's fashion departments: Romain Kremer as head menswear designer, Sébastien Peigné for womenswear and Nicola Formichetti as creative director.

From 2011 to 2013 Romain Kremer was the man responsible for men's ready-to-wear, in collaboration with Nicola Formichetti, and in January 2011 presented their first collection "Anatomy of change" for the house of Mugler.

Fall / winter 2013-2014 marked another success for Mugler menswear as Romain Kremer designed the collection from a sharp linear style into a bold, rounded contemporary silhouette. Mission accomplished, according to the New York Times. A few months later, in April 2013, the collaboration ended.

=== Designer ===
==== Camper ====
The Spanish shoe brand, Camper is renowned for collaborating with a number of leading designers both for their collection lines and their stores, known as the Together project. In 2009, Camper called on Romain Kremer and the first Camper together with Romain Kremer shoes were shown in Paris for fall / winter 2010–2011. In 2014, the collaboration between Camper and Romain Kremer spans its 8th season. In June 2014 Camper appoints Kremer as the first ever creative director in the history of the company.

==== Mykita ====
2009-2011: Romain Kremer collaborated with German eyewear specialist, Mykita. Their first model, ROMAIN, based on ancient Inuit ocular protection and evoking vibes of war paint, with its metal shutters, was shown for spring / summer 2010. Their second season together gained international notoriety when Lady Gaga was spotted wearing the YURI, named after Yuri Gagarin, the first man in space. The Los Angeles Times subsequently asked "who would wear this helmet?", while others labeled the limited-edition piece as eyewear couture For their last season together, Mykita and Romain Kremer presented the GORDON for spring / summer 2011. The lightweight model, inspired by goggles for soldering, was later worn by The Black Eyed Peas' Apl.de.ap during the Super Bowl XLV.

== See also ==
- London Fashion Week
- Paris Fashion Week
- List of fashion events
