= Ivorypress =

Publishing house specialising in artists' books

- Founded: 1996
- Founder: Elena Ochoa Foster
- Headquarters location: Madrid, Spain
- Publication types: Books and magazines
- Nonfiction topics: Artist's book
- Official website: www.ivorypress.com

Ivorypress is a publishing company that was founded in London in 1996 by Elena Ochoa Foster as a publishing house specialising in artists' books. The project also encompasses a wide range of areas and activities within the framework of contemporary art, including its own art gallery and bookshop, art consultancy and art exhibitions curatorship, editorial services, audio-visual productions and education.

In 2008, Ivorypress Art + Books was established. This consists of a bookshop and an art gallery, with a permanent artists’ books exhibition and an ongoing temporary exhibitions programme that have made Ivorypress Space one of the most emblematic art galleries and significant actors in Madrid’s cultural scene.

In addition to its exhibition calendar in Madrid, Ivorypress is also involved in intense curatorial activity surrounding the creation, design and production of international exhibition projects in collaboration with significant institutions and events.

Ivorypress is also involved in the education and support of emerging talents, as well as in the promotion of contemporary art in higher education.

Every year, Ivorypress sponsors and organises a Contemporary Art Professorship, being the first academic initiative of its kind to do so, at the University of Oxford, UK, in association with the Ruskin School of Drawing & Fine Art and Magdalen College.

Ivorypress also publishes the C International Photo Magazine.

Elena Ochoa Foster is the founder and current CEO of Ivorypress.

== Artists' books Collections ==
Ivorypress's artist book collection comprises hundreds of works by Spanish and international artists. The collection brings together some of the most significant artists' books from the 19th century to the present day.

An important focus of the Ivorypress collection is to ensure the correct restoration and conservation of these historic works. To this end, it employs a group of experts to ensure all aspects of conservation, from producing shelving adapted for the proper storage of the books, to manufacturing archive boxes, through to the use of durable materials in the production of the books.

Ivorypress hosts a permanent exhibition of a selection of its titles at its space in Madrid and organises temporary exhibitions related to artists' books. It has recently acquired all of the editions published by the Library Council of the Museum of Modern Art, New York. (MoMA), which have been exhibited as part of the collection since February 2016. Ivorypress also carries out extensive educational work, organising guided tours of the collection for individuals and groups of students.

== Artists' books ==
Ivorypress's publishing house publishes artists’ books. Far removed from conventional books, they are extremely valuable works of art individually designed and produced by each artist. Conceived to be displayed as works of art, each book is published as a numbered limited edition and is carefully produced using techniques ranging from rediscovered medieval processes to the most advanced modern technologies.

These artists’ books are part of the collections of Museo Chillida-Leku, San Sebastián, Spain; Museo Nacional Centro de Arte Reina Sofía (MNCARS), Madrid, Spain; Museum of Modern Art, New York, USA; The Noguchi Museum, New York, USA; Victoria and Albert Museum, London, UK, and foundations such as the Cass Sculpture Foundation, Goodwood, UK; The Estate of Francis Bacon, London, UK; Fundação Serralves, Porto, Portugal, as well as private collections worldwide such as Colección Pérez Simón, Mexico, and the François Pinault Collection, Venice, Italy.
