= École nationale supérieure d'arts de Paris-Cergy =

National public school of art and design established in Cergy-Pontoise

Ecole nationale supérieure d'arts de Paris Cergy (ENSAPC)
- Type: Public
- Established: 1975
- Undergraduates: BA
- Postgraduates: Master
- Location: Cergy-Pontoise, France; 49°02′12″N 2°04′40″E

The École nationale supérieure d'arts de Paris Cergy is a National public school of art and design established in Cergy-Pontoise. It is one of the five National Art schools in France, run by the French Ministry of Culture (France). Recognized as France's second best graduate school of arts, it delivers the DNSEP, Master's degree of Fine Arts, as well as Post Masters. It presents itself as a "laboratory for contemporary art" around dance studios, film, sound, video, painting, photography, drawing, writing, and multimedia.

It runs its own art gallery, Ygrec, located in Paris

It runs exchange programs with La Cambre in Brussels; Central Saint Martins, London; Otis College of Art and Design, Los Angeles; Royal Danish Academy of Fine Arts, Copenhagen, among others

== Notable teachers ==
- François Bon
- Geoffroy de Lagasnerie
- Luc Lang
- Orlan

== Notable alumni ==
- Zoulikha Bouabdellah
- Ronan & Erwan Bouroullec
- Cyril Duval
- Loris Gréaud
- Emmanuel Guillaud
- Michel Hazanavicius
- Jean-Michel Othoniel
- Eshel Meir
