= Item Idem =

French artist (born 1977)

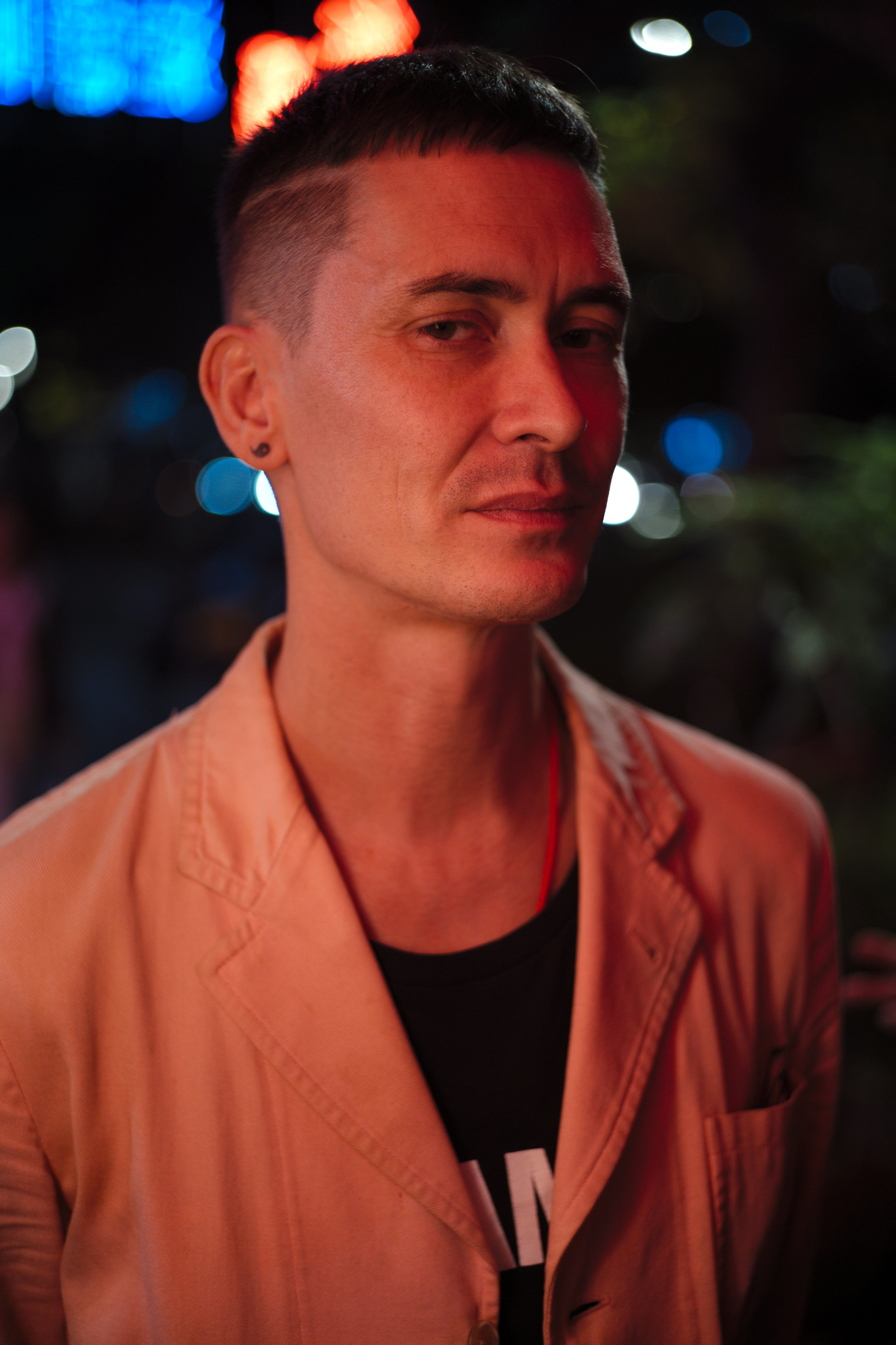
- Item Idem in Taipei, 2019
- Born: Cyril Loup Aime Duval Hörlin du Houx; December 31, 1977 (age 48); Paris, France
- Known for: Media based conceptual art, retail design
- Awards: Great Indoors Award

Cyril Duval (born December 31, 1977), who works under the name Item Idem, is a French conceptual artist, designer, and filmmaker. He lives and works in Taipei, Taiwan.

== Biography ==
Duval was born in Paris, France, in 1977. His mother worked for the luxury goods manufacturer Hermès, while his father was an interior decorator. Duval studied for six years at the École nationale supérieure d'arts de Paris-Cergy, before moving to Tokyo in 2004.

== Career ==
Duval's work encompasses conceptual art, film, sculpture, product design, and visual communication. His alter ego Item Idem (Latin for "the same"), operates as a brand for the artist, whose work often builds on top of existing fashion and retail brands. The New York Times reviewed one of Duval's performances as "Celine Dion at the Oscars channeling René Magritte," while the writer John Stones has described the artist's persona as "Austin Powers pretending to be Philippe Starck, art directed by Marcel Duchamp and scripted by Oscar Wilde."

=== Retail design and installations ===
In 2004, Duval was discovered by Sarah Andelman, the creative director of Colette. The Paris-based boutique teamed Duval up with the Japanese fashion label Comme des Garçons in Tokyo. His work began to incorporate interior design and conceptual installations. In 2004, Duval collaborated with other artists on a relational aesthetics-inspired, multidisciplinary space called Caniche Courage, and later transformed his three-story Shibuya residence into a living exhibition.

Duval initiated a series of staged retail and working environments, beginning with The Wrong Store (2006) in Paris, a collaboration with Tobi Wong conceived as an ersatz gift-shop counterpart to Maurizio Cattelan's Wrong Gallery. Back in Tokyo, he transformed the window display of a fashion boutique into a temporary work space titled The Wrong Office, which he followed up with The Wrong Motel.

Duval collaborated with Bernhard Willhelm on the German fashion designer's flagship store at the PARCO department store in Shibuya, Tokyo. The shop's re-use of cardboard, plastic, and rope materials was inspired by the resourcefulness of Japan's homeless communities. The store won the Best Shop Concept for FRAME magazine's 2007 Great Indoors Award.

In 2009, Duval participated in the Cycles and Seasons fashion and art event in Moscow. In 2011, Duval was the first artist-in-residence at BLESS HOME, an apartment-cum-shop in Berlin, which became his temporary studio while serving as the art director for Bruce LaBruce's production of Pierrot Lunaire. In 2015, he built an installation as an interior for Airbnb's Art House for Art Basel Hong Kong.

Duval has worked with a number of art publications, including as the Fashion Director for Tokion (2005), Fashion Features Director for Modern Weekly China (2013), Special Projects coordinator for Flash Art (2006), and as a collaborator with 032c, T: The New York Times Style Magazine, and LEAP Magazine. He has also worked on large-scale commercial projects for CELINE and Ford.

=== Exhibitions and collaborations ===
In 2007, Duval reconfigured CELINE's Tokyo store to host his exhibition Displaysthetics during DesignTide Tokyo. In 2008, he participated in Fredric Snitzer Gallery's show in Miami, Death by Basel, with an oversized Chanel logo in the style of McDonald's Golden Arches, as a comparison of the brands and their markets. For AA Bronson's School for Young Shaman's exhibition in New York, Duval fashioned a cape out of Louis Vuitton bags and melted car tires, which was an homage to Joseph Beuys.

For the exhibition Dysfashional at the Garage Museum in Moscow in 2010, Duval created a work titled Mount Blushmore, a crystal engraving which combined images of fashion icons Anna Wintour, Donatella Versace, John Galliano and Karl Lagerfeld. In 2014, Duval mounted his first solo exhibition at Johannes Vogt, New York, titled Voir Dire.

In 2016, Duval participated in the Work in Progress artist residency in Times Square, New York. That same year, he held an exhibition titled Method of Loci at The Breeder Gallery in Athens, Greece, and collaborated with Flash Art Special Projects in a special presentation at Paramount Ranch.

Duval has exhibited at the Centre Pompidou, the Garage Museum, MoMA PS1, and Palais de Tokyo. His work has been featured in 032c, Casa BRUTUS, FRAME, The New York Times, Frankfurter Allgemeine Zeitung, Harper’s Bazaar Korea, and WWD.

=== Shanzhai Biennial ===
Duval is the co-founder of the artists collective Shanzhai Biennial with stylist Avena Gallagher and artist Babak Radboy. The collective describes itself as a "multinational brand posing as an art-project posing as an [sic] multinational brand posing as a biennial", "a pure brand unencumbered by products", in other words a "meta-brand". The name is meant to evoke a bi-annual art exhibition, but instead of taking a city as its namesake, it refers to the Shanzhai counterfeit consumer goods industry in China, and the intentionally incorrect appropriation of luxury brand names. Inspired by knockoff goods in Manhattan's Chinatown, the collective was initiated as a critique of the art and fashion industries, as well as a celebration of the ingenuity and humour of Shanzhai culture. The collective undertakes projects by invitation from cultural institutions or brands, and highlights the aspect of Shanzhai that M+ curator Aric Chen has called the "pop art of China".

As a precursor to the collective's projects, Duval curated a selection of Shanzhai objects in collaboration with DIS Magazine. The objects were photographed by Marco Roso for an exhibition titled Shanzhai Anxiety at Colette in 2011.

Shanzhai Biennial No. 1 was held during Beijing Design Week 2012. The artists created a fake fashion campaign photo-shoot based on the paintings of Chinese artist Yue Minjun, and installed a false store-front in Beijing's Chaochangdi village, complete with red carpet, rope lines, and a step and repeat press wall. The ad campaign also ran as an eight-page editorial in the Chinese lifestyle magazine Modern Weekly. When the New York Times mistook the project for "a high-concept fashion line" that hadn't yet produced a collection, the artists decided not to issue a correction.

Shanzhai Biennial No. 2 consisted of a video depicting the artist Wu Ting Ting dressed as a shampoo bottle and lip-syncing to a Chinese rendition of Sinéad O'Connor’s Nothing Compares 2 U, and was displayed on an LED curtain for MoMA PS1's ProBio exhibition in 2013.

The artists followed this up with Shanzhai Biennial No. 3 at Frieze London 2014, conceived as a branding exercise for the art fair. Working with a local luxury real-estate agency, the artists transformed a booth space into a model real-estate office ostensibly selling a £32 million London mansion, complete with a professional ad campaign, and trafficking in the Frieze brand with a fake luxury bag, and limited edition souvenirs.

Shanzhai Biennial has collaborated with the designer Telfar Clemens, the musician Fatima Al Qadiri, as well as TankTV and DIS Magazine, and has exhibited work at West Bund Art & Design, Centre Pompidou, and the New Museum.

=== Films ===
In 2013, Duval created the short film Joss with Chinese artist Cheng Ran, depicting paper funeral items resembling fashion accessories and commercial brands being destroyed by flames and fire crackers. The film has been screened at Palais de Tokyo (Paris), K11 Art Foundation Pop-up Space (Hong Kong), and Museum of Contemporary Art Taipei.

Duval's short film NUII premièred at the Bethlehem Baptist Church in Los Angeles in 2017. The film features corporate and political symbols being burnt in effigy. His experimental short film COLD SINGLE was filmed in Taitung, Taiwan, with Taiwanese director Mel Hsieh, inspired by his life in the country. The film was presented for the first time at ASIA NOW at the Paris Asian Art Fair in 2019, with its US première set for Frieze Los Angeles 2020 at the Paramount Theatre.

== Brand ==
=== Incorporation and trademark registration ===
After returning to Paris, Cyril Duval founded and incorporated Item Idem in France and the European Union as a Société par actions simplifiée unipersonnelle (SASU).

In spring 2025, the name Item Idem was registered as a trademark under several classes of the Nice Classification, covering product and service categories related to objects, editions, design, textiles, clothing, retail, cultural activities, and artistic services.

=== Opening of the Paris space ===
In autumn 2025, Cyril Duval opened a permanent Item Idem retail space at 12 rue Bleue, in the 9th arrondissement of Paris.

The venue is located in a former supermarket and was conceived to accommodate both retail activities and temporary exhibitions.

According to Wallpaper*, the space combines a shop and an exhibition area, presenting contemporary artworks, limited editions, and design objects, alongside works produced by the artist.

=== Exhibition program and collaborations ===
The project presents works by contemporary artists and designers, as well as pieces associated with the Memphis movement, the Fluxus group, and postmodern design from the 1980s and 1990s.

Exhibitions are organized on a quarterly basis under the title Display.

The first exhibition, Display #1: Supermarket (October–November 2025), brought together works by artists associated with the Fluxus movement, including Ben Vautier and George Maciunas.

Item Idem has also collaborated with contemporary artists, notably Barbara Kruger.

As part of a partnership with Performa, Item Idem participated in the editing and distribution of the reissue of Untitled (The Drop), a work originally created for the Performa 17 Biennial in 2017. The reissue took the form of a limited-edition series of garments.

The second exhibition, The Holiday Market (November 2025–February 2026), presented pieces of Italian postmodern design, including works by Ettore Sottsass, Martine Bedin, Peter Shire, Lawrence Weiner, objects by Philippe Starck, as well as pieces by Alessandro Guerriero from Studio Alchimia.

=== Critical reception ===
The project has been the subject of articles in several publications specializing in design and contemporary art.

The Design Release describes Item Idem as a space combining commercial and cultural functions.

Wallpaper* presents the venue as a space dedicated to art, design, and limited editions.

According to The Art Newspaper, the project is part of an approach aimed at offering works at price levels considered more accessible than those of traditional gallery circuits.

Several other media, including MKRS Family and Cultur Inse Magazine, highlight the project within Cyril Duval’s professional trajectory.
