= Jahan Loh =

Singaporean artist

- Born: 8 November 1976 (age 49); Hakka Chinese

JAHAN LOH
- Chinese: 羅傑瀚
Transcriptions
Standard Mandarin
- Hanyu Pinyin: Luo Jie Han
- Wade–Giles: luo^{3}jie^{2}han^{4}

Jahan Loh (Chinese: 羅傑瀚; born 1976) is a contemporary artist based in Singapore.

== Personal life ==
Jahan Loh grew up in Singapore and is of Chinese Hakka descent. He attended St. Joseph's Institution, Singapore. At 17, he forayed into street art. From 1997 to 2000, Loh attended LASALLE College of the Arts in Singapore where he studied fine art under a scholarship from Singapore Press Holdings. He furthered his studies, majoring in design and obtained his master's degree from the University of New South Wales in 2002.

== Career ==
In 2002 upon graduating, Loh made his debut into pop art with his first solo show "CHERRY POP", following which, he returned to serve his scholarship bond within the Singapore Press Holdings division of The Straits Times where he worked as an artist, creating cartoons and info graphics for the national paper. He broke his bond within a year and moved to Taipei after being offered a job there. Loh worked in MACHI Entertainment under Jeffrey Huang, the company's creative director. In 2005, he gained fame for his drawings for Machi (hip hop group) CD sleeve design and the band's music videos. He won several Taiwanese Music awards including MTV's CD cover Design of the Year. With the boom in the Taiwanese music industry, Loh set up Invasion Studios with Jeff 黃立成 and his brother Stanley Huang to design album covers and music videos. With the advancement of MP3 and music downloads, the industry declined and Loh turned the direction of Invasion Studios towards art and animation. His work both as a commercial and fine artist marked a new approach to art practices in Taiwan.

In 2006, he exhibited his work in a joint show titled "COLLISION" with John Matos at Singapore's art centre, Esplanade – Theatres on the Bay. This was the first graffiti art show held in a formal art institution in Singapore. In 2007, Loh signed with MINGART Gallery and held his first Taipei solo pop art exhibition in 2008. The controversial exhibition "CHERRY POP II" depicted suggestive nude paintings and sculptures, which gained him a lot of attention from the media. Taiwanese critics acknowledged Loh as one of the key artist which has made Singapore POP art international. In 2008, Loh was selected for 8Q-RATE, the inaugural exhibition of 8Q SAM in Singapore. Loh took a year's sabbatical after this show. He returned to his art and held his first solo show in China, "THE GREAT WALL", in Beijing's 798 Art Zone, which was sponsored by VANS in 2009.

From 2010, Loh created paintings of iconic pop objects as a collective with Jakuan Melendez and Edison Chen who went by the moniker "Etelier Des Chene". The trio named themselves Treacherous Treis and showcased their work at the Museum of Art & Design, Singapore. After spending 9 years in Taiwan, he returned to Singapore and created a series of work named RECONSTITUTED PHILOSOPHIES. Loh began to paint contemporary still lifes of luncheon meat and syrup cans, using the common everyday objects to express his cultural diaspora. This collection of works, which included an installation titled "Cherry Poke", exhibited at his second show at the Esplanade in 2011. In the same year, some of those works were selected by the Andy Warhol foundation to be showcased in Andy Warhol's exhibition, 15 Minutes Eternal, at ArtScience Museum Marina Bay Sands. In 2012, Loh's art was once again featured in a private showcase by SAATCHI & SAATCHI.

In 2013, Loh recontextualized iconography and pop cultural in a solo show "WORKING CLASS HEROES" at CHAN HAMPE Galleries at Raffles Hotel. His paintings paid tribute to the everyday unseen heroes and had pop and religious references that explored a contemporary examination of Singapore and the world. A brass sculpture was the highlight of the show, the result of frequent trips Loh made to a foundry in Thailand where he created 3-dimensional relief sculptures of Jesus using the lost-wax casting technique. In the months during production, the foundry met with fire mishap which burnt down the entire factory. Loh's 6 brass sculptures came out unharmed.

In August that year, Loh held a joint art exhibition with skate legend, Steve Caballero, in Hong Kong. Titled Double Dragons, the show featured illustrations that revolved around that theme.
