= Singapore Art Museum =

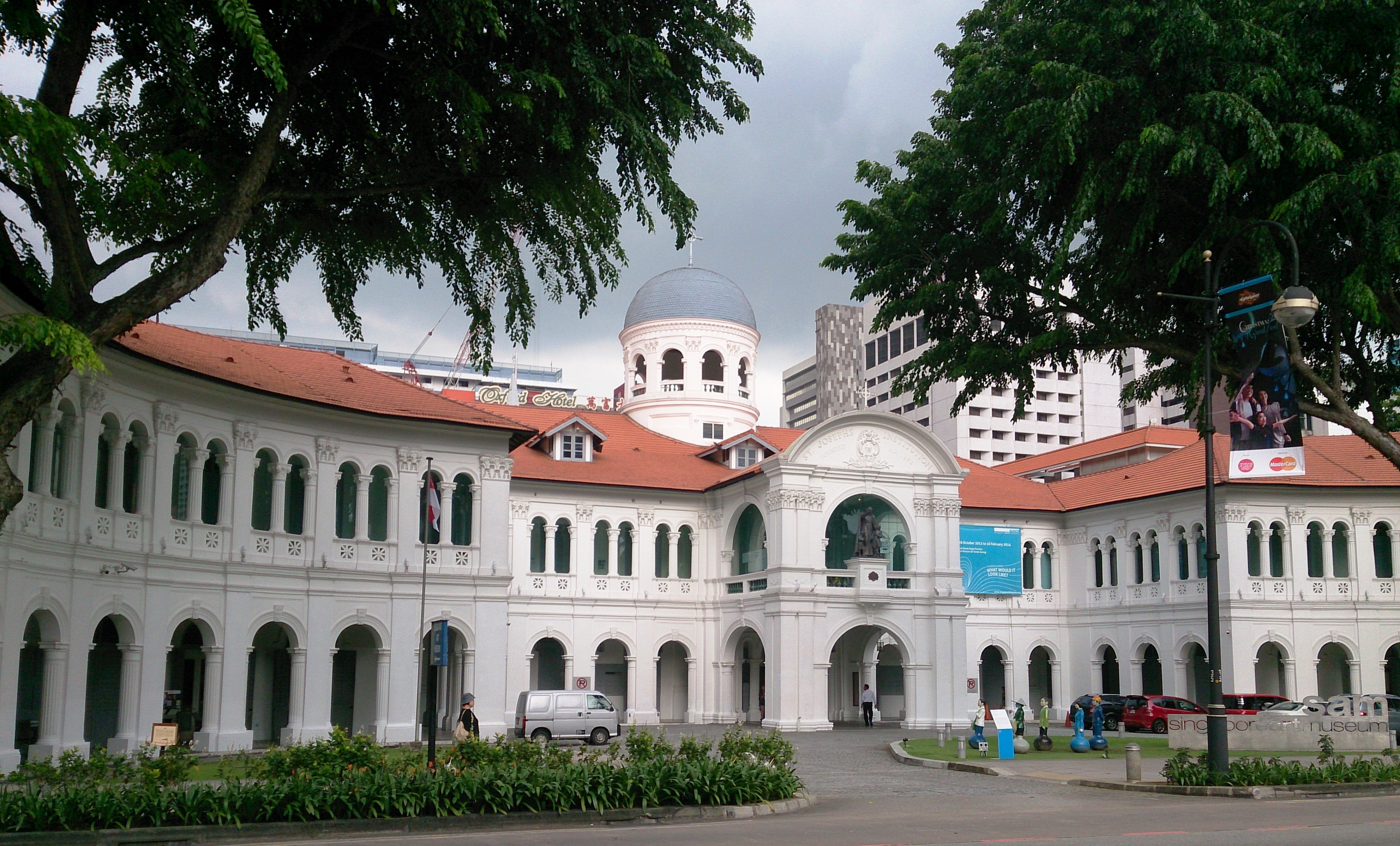
- Front view of the Singapore Art Museum
- Former name: Saint Joseph's Institution
- Established: 20 January 1996; 30 years ago
- Location: 39 Keppel Rd, #03-07 Tanjong Pagar Distripark, Singapore 089065
- Coordinates: 1.2719°N 103.8383°E
- Type: Contemporary Art; Museum
- Collections: Singaporean, Southeast Asian and East Asian art
- Director: Dr Eugene Tan
- Chairperson: Edmund Cheng
- Architect: Charles Benedict Nain
- Public transit access: EW15 Tanjong Pagar; CC31 Cantonment
- Website: www.singaporeartmuseum.sg

The Singapore Art Museum (Abbreviation: SAM) is an art museum with multiple venues across Singapore. It is the first fully dedicated contemporary visual arts museum in Singapore with public collections by local and Southeast artists. It collaborates with international art museums to co-curate contemporary art exhibitions.

SAM presents art at its five galleries at Tanjong Pagar Distripark and other partner venues across Singapore. From its opening in 1996 to 2019, SAM was based at two heritage buildings: the former Saint Joseph’s Institution on Bras Basah Road and the former Catholic High School on Queen Street. The museum organises the Singapore Biennale, starting from 2011, and the Singapore Pavilion at the Venice Biennale from 2024.

== History ==
Officially opened on 20 January 1996, SAM is one of the first art museums with international-standard museum facilities and programmes in Southeast Asia.

The museum, then known as a fine art museum, was born out of a project by the National Museum to set up a five-museum precinct in the city. The other four museums that make up the precinct are known as the Singapore History Museum, Asian Civilisations Museum, People's Museum and the Children's Museum. The Fine Arts Museum project began with the restoration of the former St. Joseph's Institution building. At the same time, the appointment of artist and surgeon Earl Lu to head an 11-member Fine Arts Museum Board was announced on 18 July 1992, by the Minister of State (Information and the Arts and Education), Ker Sin Tze. The museum board was tasked to acquire works of art by notable painters from Southeast Asia and East Asia, and by upcoming artists from these regions. Low Chuck Tiew, a retired banker and prominent art collector, served as museum adviser, along with Shirley Loo-Lim, Deputy Director of the National Museum of Singapore as vice-chairman of the board. Geh Min, Ho Kok Hoe, Lee Seng Tee, Arthur Lim, T.K. Sabapathy, Sarkasi Said, Sum Yoke Kit, Wee Chwee Heng, Singapore Polytechnic alumni, and Yap-Whang Whee Yong formed the rest of the museum board. The restoration work on the then 140-year-old national monument took more than two years at a cost of S$30 million. It first opened its doors to the public as the Singapore Art Museum on 20 October 1995. Its first art installation was a S$90,000, 7 m (23 ft)-high Swarovski crystal chandelier at the museum main entrance. It weighs 325 kilograms and took over three months to make. The museum was officially opened by the Prime Minister of Singapore, Goh Chok Tong on 20 January 1996. In his opening speech he envisioned the new museum, along with the other four museums in the Arts and Heritage District and the Arts Centre, aiding Singapore in reprising its historic role as a centre of entrepot trade for the arts, culture, civilisation and ideas to the people in the Asian region and the rest of the world.

In 2008, the museum opened SAM at 8Q, a new wing for contemporary art, at the former Catholic High School on 8 Queen Street.

In 2017 and 2019, the museum closed its two heritage buildings on Bras Basah Road and Queen Street for redevelopment.

In January 2022, SAM opened a new contemporary art space at Tanjong Pagar Distripark. Spread across two floors, SAM at Tanjong Pagar Distripark houses two galleries, an F&B space and residency studios. Museum exhibitions and events continue at partner venues and community spaces.

The reopening of SAM's heritage buildings was rescheduled from 2021 to 2023 to 2026, when it was announced that SAM will not return to Bras Basah, but remain at Tanjong Pagar Distripark, with the opening of a fifth gallery space there.

== Residencies ==
The Singapore Art Museum’s residency program was planned since 2021, entering formal operation afterward. It is now in its third cycle of open call. The most recent second cycle artists included many renowned Asian artists, such as Arie Syarifuddin, Bolun Shen, Carlos Quijon, Jr., Charmaine Poh, Sorawit Songsataya, Suvani Suri, etc.

== Location and amenities ==
SAM at Tanjong Pagar Distripark is located in a historic port district, alongside other gallery and exhibition spaces such as Gajah Gallery and ArtSpace@Helutrans. It is of walking proximity to Chinatown, Duxton and Everton Park and accessible by public buses, MRT and cab services.

== Collection and exhibitions ==
SAM's approach is to present works curated from the National Collection alongside changing exhibitions, to offer a well-rounded aesthetic experience of Asian contemporary art. From 2001, the museum began acquiring works and accepting donations from around the region, including regional contemporary artists like Cheo Chai-Hiang, Dinh Q. Lê, Natee Utarit, Nge Lay, Suzann Victor and Titarubi.

The museum also regularly partners with other leading art institutions to co-curate and produce exhibitions, such as the collaboration with the Yokohama Museum of Art for Still Moving: A Triple Bill on the Image; Museum of Contemporary Art Tokyo for Trans-Cool TOKYO (highlighting works by Japanese artists such as Yayoi Kusama and Yasumasa Morimura); Video, An Art, A History with the Pompidou Center (Bill Viola, Jean-Luc Godard, Bruce Nauman); and They Do Not Understand Each Other with Tai Kwun and National Museum of Art, Osaka.

The museum organises regular contemporary art exhibitions and events. For example, French artist Stéphane Blanquet was invited, twice, to present installations. Once, for the Night Lights festival in 2012, with Distorted Forest and once for Art Gardens in 2013, with Glossy Dreams in Depth. French artist Emmanuel Guillaud presented an in-situ version of his installation Until the sun rises in 2011.

Since 2010, SAM started to focus on contemporary art practices from Southeast Asia. More recently, the museum presented Time Passes in 2020, an exhibition which showcased the works of 13 emerging Singaporean artists, and The Gift in 2021, an exhibition which featured artists from the region such as Dolorosa Sinaga, Ho Tzu Nyen, Korakrit Arunanondchai, Salleh Japar and Tang Da Wu, among others.

== Censorships in 1998 and 2011 ==
In 1998, SAM hosted ARX 5 (Artists’ Regional Exchange) where Hong Kong artist and caricaturist Zunzi's work, Lee's Garden, was removed from the museum's walls by its staff. The work consisted of a caricature of Prime Minister Goh Chok Tong wielding pest-control gear, with the senior minister and former prime minister Lee Kuan Yew patting him on the back. This censorship was committed without any consultation with or notification of the artist, and sparked off a diplomatic and media incident.

In late 2011, following a private preview, SAM removed Japanese-British artist Simon Fujiwara’s work, Welcome to the Hotel Munber. The piece, which was part of an exhibition organised by the National Arts Council in 2010, featured homoerotic content. Despite advisory notices put up by the museum and the Singapore Biennale, the work was taken down without any consultation with or notification of the artist after pressure by conservative groups.

== See also ==
- National Gallery Singapore

== Literature ==
- Singapore Biennale 2013: If the World Changed, ISBN 978-981-07-8026-5
- Tomorrow, Today: Contemporary Art from the Singapore Art Museum (2009–2011), ISBN 978-981-07-1880-0
- Are You Afraid of Contemporary Art? by Vincent Leow, ISBN 978-981-07-1029-3
