= Elena Ochoa Foster =

Spanish publisher and art curator

The Right Honourable The Lady Foster of Thames Bank
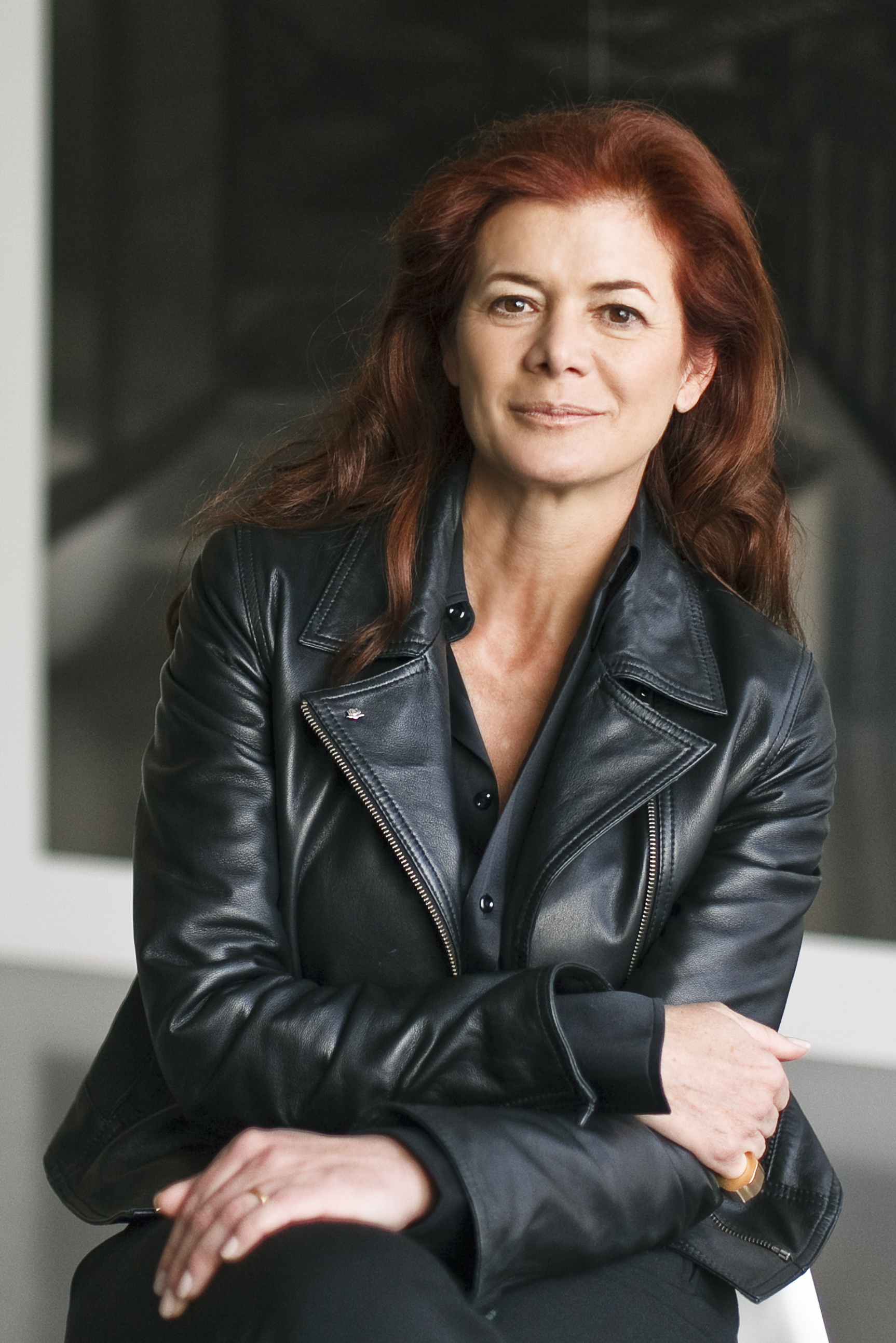
- Ochoa Foster at Ivorypress
- Born: Elena Fernández-Ferreiro López de Ochoa; 24 September 1958 (age 68); Ourense, Spain
- Occupations: publisher, curator, professor
- Spouse: Norman Foster (m. –)

Elena Ochoa Foster, Baroness Foster of Thames Bank (née Elena Fernández-Ferreiro López de Ochoa) is a Spanish publisher and art curator, and formerly a professor of psychopathology. She is the founder and chief executive officer of Ivorypress.

== Life ==
Elena Ochoa Foster was a tenured professor of psychopathology at the Complutense University of Madrid for almost two decades. She was honorary professor at King's College London until 2001. She was awarded a Fulbright Scholarship to undertake postdoctoral studies at the University of Illinois Chicago and the University of California, Los Angeles.

In 1996, in London, she founded Ivorypress, a private organisation that undertakes publishing and curatorial activities. Their premises include an art gallery, a publishing house and a bookshop focusing on photography, architecture and contemporary art. She remains its chief executive officer.

She has curated international exhibitions in close collaboration with the Ivorypress team, including 'C on Cities' (10th Venice Architecture Biennale, Venice, 2006), 'Blood on Paper' (Victoria & Albert Museum, London, 2008), 'Real Venice' (54th Venice Art Biennale, Venice, 2011), 'Real Venice' (Somerset House, London, 2012) and 'ToledoContemporánea' (Fundación El Greco, Toledo, 2014).

From 2021 to 2022, to mark the occasion of Ivorypress' twenty-fifth anniversary, she curated a multi-institutional exhibitions programme involving museums and libraries across Europe and the United States.

Ochoa served on the jury of the Princess of Asturias Awards for its Communication and Humanities category from 2008 to 2010 and served on its Arts category jury from 2013 to 2017. She is a member of MoMA's Library Council and serves on the advisory board of the Prix Pictet photography award. As a patron, she supports a variety of museums and foundations including the Museo del Prado, alongside several international schools of contemporary art and photography, such as Spain's Academy of the Arts and the Cinematographic Sciences. She has served as Chair of the Tate Galleries International Council and as Trustee of the Tate Foundation as well as the Isamu Noguchi Foundation.

She serves as part of the board of trustees of the Serpentine Gallery (London, UK) as well as being the chair of its International Council since 2017. She has also been a Member of the Organising Committee of the Golden Trezzini Awards for Architecture and Design (St. Petersburg, Russia) since 2021. Elena Ochoa Foster is vice president and trustee of the Norman Foster Foundation in London and Madrid. She is also part of the board of directors of the American Friends of the Norman Foster Foundation.

== Personal life ==
In 1996, Ochoa married English architect Norman Foster. In 1999, he was raised to the peerage giving her the title Lady Foster of Thames Bank.

She lives and works between Switzerland, Spain, United Kingdom and the United States.

== Recognition and awards ==
=== Academic and media career ===
- National Award for Scientific Research. Entidad Abelló, Spain, 1984
- Joint Spanish-American Committee, Fulbright Scholarship, Spain, 1985.
- Research Grant, Veterans Administration and the National Institute of Mental Health, USA, 1986.
- Research Grant, National Fund for the Development of Scientific and Technological Research, Spain 1988.
- European Award for Mass Media and Television, Premio Ondas, Spain, 1990.
- National Prize of the Royal College of Psychology for the Best Communication in Mass Media. 1991, 1993 and 1995.

=== Film producer career ===
How much does your building weigh, Mr. Foster?:

- TCM Audience Award for Best Documentary at the European Film Festival in San Sebastian, Spain, 2010
- First Prize of the Jury of Docville International Documentary Festival, Leuven, Belgium, 2010
- Best Cinematography Award at the International Documentary section of the Sichuan TV Festival Chinese festival (SCTVF), 2011
- Nominated for the Goya Awards in the category of Best Documentary, Madrid, Spain, 2011

Shooting the Mafia:

- Audience Award Brussels International Film Festival, Brussels, Belgium, 2019.
- Best Documentary Award Batumi International ArtHouse Film Festival, Batumi, Georgia, 2019
- Guerrilla Staff Award Biografilm Festival, Bologna, Italy, 2019

=== Publisher and Curator career ===
- Gold Medal Queen Sofia Spanish Institute, USA, 2012
- Real Fundación de Toledo Award in the 'Curator' category for the exhibition 'ToledoContemporánea', Spain, 2015
- Montblanc de la Culture Arts Patronage Award, Spain, 2016
- Ibero-American Patronage Award, Spain, 2016

== General references ==
- Saioa Camarzana. "Elena Ochoa: Siento que acabo de empezar con este proyecto editorial". El Cultural. April, 2021.
- Javier Díaz-Guardiola. "Elena Ochoa: «El instinto con un artista funciona como el del amor verdadero»". ABC. March, 2021.
- "Forbes: las 25 personas más influyentes en España de 2020 son todas mujeres". Forbes. December, 2020.
- Carmen Melgar. "El mito de Elena". Vogue Spain. November, 2019.
- Maite Sebastia. "5 grandes mujeres del arte nos explican la revolución femenina en el sector". SModa. November, 2017.
- Álex Rodríguez. "Me bebería todos los buenos vinos de casa". La Vanguardia. October, 2017.
- David Moralejo. "Elena Ochoa Foster, una casa con mucho arte". T Spain: The New York Times Style Magazine. May, 2017.
- Juan Cruz. "Elena Foster: 'Los artistas te dan adrenalina'". El País Semanal, El País Newspaper. March, 2017.
- Lola Fernández. "Elena Ochoa: 'Es una torpeza mental imperdonable que un gobierno no apoye las artes'". Yo Dona, El Mundo Newspaper. February, 2017.
- Garbiñe Continente. "Elena Ochoa Foster, Presidenta del Consejo de las Serpentine Galleries". Harper's Bazaar Spain. January, 2017.
- Vicky Vilches. "Elena Ochoa en defensa del mecenazgo cultural". Fuera de Serie, Expansión. June, 2016.
- 'Elena Ochoa Foster Wins Ibero-American Prize for Art Patronage'. ArtForum Magazine. 10 February 2016 ArtForum Magazine. 10 February 2016
- 'Elena Ochoa Foster, premio Iberoamericano de Mecenazgo. El jurado reconoce la labor en el Arte de la editora, comisaria y fundadora de Ivorypress'. El País newspaper. 9 February 2016. El País newspaper. 9 February 2016
- Elsa Fernández-Santos. 'Elena Ochoa Foster. El arte de reinventarse a propósito'. Harper's Bazaar. February 2016. Harper's Bazaar. February 2016
- Raphael Minder. 'Spain Pays Tribute to El Greco 400 Years After His Death'. The New York Times. April, 2014.
- Jiyoon Lee. ' 에술과 책의 융합 지휘하는 엘레나 포스터'. Sunday Magazine. February, 2014.
- IOANA NICOLAESCU. 'Lady di stile. Intervista a Elena Ochoa Foster fondatice di Ivorypress e moglie dell'archistar Norman Foster'. Elle Italy. July, 2013.
- Beatriz Fabián. 'Elena Ochoa. El mercado del arte está más activo que nunca'. Nuevo Estilo Magazine. July, 2012.
- Almudena Ávalos, 'Ivorypress. Una editorial de culto. Descubrimos el trabajo diario de la ambiciona empresa fundada por Elena Ochoa'. S Moda Magazine, El País newspaper. 26 January 2011.
- Paula Achiaga, 'Elena Ochoa: Ivorypress no tiene referente. Es un referente. nació para provocar'. El Cultural, El Mundo newspaper. 7 January 2001.
- Isabel Lafont, 'Arte en los confines de la literatura. Los libros de artista editados por Elena Ochoa tratan de llevar al extremo la creatividad de sus autores', El País newspaper. 10 November 2010.
- Christine Murray, "Christine Murray interviews Elena Ochoa Foster at the opening of V&A's Blood on Paper", Architects' Journal. 227.17 (1 May 2008): p52-53. Gale Document Number: GALE|A179953939
- Martin Gayford, 'Blood on Paper: Who needs words?'. The Daily Telegraph. 12 April 2008.
- María Martínez, 'Elena Foster. Coleccionista de almas'. Personas de Confianza. March, 2005.
- Bettina von Hase, 'Making book. With the rarefied productions of her Ivorypress, Elena Foster is taking the concept of the artist's book to a new level'. Art + Auction. June, 2005.
- Jesús Rodríguez, 'El arte de Lady Foster'. El País semanal, El País newspaper. January, 2005.
- Samantha Conti, 'Fit to print'. W Magazine. December, 2004.
- Javier Fdez. de Angulo, 'La pasión de Lady Foster'. Vogue Spain. August, 2004.
- Ralf Eibl, "IM ELFENBEINTURM - Mit ihrem Ivorypress produziert Lady Foster spektakuläre Bücher für die Ewigkeit". Architectural Digest (Germany). June, 2004.
- Richard Cork. "The Ivory Tower", The Times (United Kingdom), 21 Feb 2004. Biographical piece about Elena Ochoa Foster.
- "Lady Foster follows her art", The Daily Telegraph, 21 Oct. 2003. Gale Document Number: GALE|A109048067. Brief piece about Elena Ochoa Foster.
