= Emmanuel Guillaud =

French artist (born 1970)

Emmanuel Guillaud (born 1970) is a French artist.

== Biography ==
Guillaud is a French visual artist working with photography. He mostly exhibits his work as synchronized slideshows / multi-screens installations. Resident at Villa Kujoyama.

== Installation works (selected) ==
- 2018: (brûler les abîmes) / (burning abysses), version at St Cavalier, Malte
- 2018: (brûler les abîmes) / (burning abysses), version at Chateau Coquelle, Dunkerque
- 2017: (brûler les abîmes) / (burning abysses), version at La Plate-Forme, Dunkerque
- 2017: Untitled (after Piranesi), version at l'Institut; Institut Franco-japonais de Tokyo
- 2015: Until the sun rises (version juin 2015): Pavillon Vendôme, Centre d'art contemporain de Clichy
- 2015: Untitled (lines), Expositions ravages, Le Point Ephémère, Paris
- 2011: Until the sun rises (in its Jan 2011 version, 3 synchronized projections), Singapore Art Museum
- 2010: Until the sun rises (in its May 2010 version, 4 synchronized projections with sound made in collaboration with Jennifer Bonn), School Gallery, Paris (solo show)
- 2009/2010: I/O (-side), part of the group show No man's land in the about-to-be-destroyed buildings of the former French Embassy in Tokyo
- 2010: gp projections 1, gp gallery, Tokyo
- 2009: Until the sun rises (in its Aug 2010 version, 3 synchronized projections), Noorderlicht Gallery, Netherlands
- 2005: (going nowhere), Super Deluxe, Tokyo. Slideshow part of "Pecha Kucha Nights"

== Other shows (selected) ==
- 2015: Untitled (traces), Exposition Watchqueen, ONE National Gay & Lesbian Archives ONE Archives at USC, Los Angeles
- 2012: Black Closer to White, Emmanuel Guillaud & Takano Ryudai, Yumiko Chiba Viewing Room, Tokyo
- 2011: Art Protects, Galerie Yvon Lambert, Paris
- 2011: Format Photography Festival, Derby UK
- 2010: Tokyo Wonderwall / 10th anniversary, Museum of Contemporary Art Tokyo
- 2010: Des photographes, des Japons, Institut Franco-Japonais de Tokyo
- 2009 / 2010: Going from Nowhere, Philadelphia Photographic Art Center, USA
- 2009: Descubrimientos, PHotoEspaña, Madrid
- 2009: Art Protects, Galerie Yvon Lambert, Paris
- 2005: (going nowhere), Tokyo Government Gallery, Tokyo (solo show)
- 2005: Tokyo Wonderwall 2005, Museum of Contemporary Art Tokyo

== Artist's books and catalogues (selected) ==
- 2012: Notes on unfinished projects, Emmanuel Guillaud & Kiyoshi Takami, Heuristic / artbeat publisher (Tokyo)
- 2010: Tokyo Wonderwall / 10th anniversary (catalogue)
- 2010: No man's land (Catalogue of the group show)
