= Rafael Megall =

Armenian painter (born 1983)

- Born: January 2, 1983 (age 43)
- Education: State Academy of Fine Arts of Armenia
- Known for: Painting, drawing
- Movement: Contemporary art

Rafael Melikyan (Armenian: Ռաֆայել Մելիքյան) known as Rafael Megall (Armenian: Ռաֆայել Մեգալ; born January 2, 1983) is an Armenian painter and artist known for his innovative style of drawing, unique perception of line, color sketches and portrayal of religious iconography of manuscripts. He is widely regarded as one of the most important contemporary Armenian artists. His art has been featured in a number of solo and group exhibitions in the United States, Europe and Southeast Asia.

== Early life and education ==
Rafael Megall was born in Yerevan, Armenian SSR. His father Armen Melikyan is a known doctor (endoscopic surgery). Megall started to paint when he was 9 years old. From 1998 to 2004 he attended the State Academy of Fine Arts of Armenia. Since 2008 he has been a member of the Union of Artists of the Republic of Armenia. He has lived and worked in Armenia and the United States since 2010. His further artistic and creative work opened to his own unique style of painting and visionary artistic philosophy.

== Artwork ==
Rafael Megall's work is characterized by a vital reflection on the relationship between nature and civilization, concurrently reworking historical art icons from different eras. Megall takes on mythical animal figures found in churches and tombs, historical figures and illuminations from medieval manuscripts. His works is the depiction of nature, which is however stylized and transformed into an ornamental pattern.

Rafael Megall uses digital elaboration of different studies on the canvases through a technique that includes the use of masks. His art refers to Armenian miniatures, Medieval art, Art Nouveau, Art Deco and modern imitations on canvas of digital art forms. Once on the canvas, the outlines and the colors of the original image are subjected to continuous modifications. His works primarily express ornamental aspects taken in part from traditional Armenian patterns.

Megall's paintings assimilate many modern technologies, including aerial photography and autostereograms.

Megall's special interest in ornamentation goes back to folk stone carvings, frescoes, medieval flyleaves and to the works of Armenian historian, ethnographer, art theorist and artist Vardges Sureniants (1860–1921).

The artist additionally refers the art practices of the 1970s, with their characteristic boost of the pictorial effect, diversity of methods and play on traditions and styles.

The artist's works from the years 2010 to 2012 can be considered iconic images. His series of paintings titled "The Panthers in My Blossoming Garden" were presented in at the 57th Venice Biennale in 2017. In 2019 Megall launched the cycle of paintings named "Porcelain Idols". Those series represent pieces porcelain figurines predominantly from the Soviet Era transferred to the canvas with almost photographic precision.

== Awards and recognition ==
In 2012 he received the Gold Medal from the Ministry of Culture of the Republic of Armenia for his services and achievement. In 2013 the President of Armenia gave him the honorary title Honored Artist of the Republic of Armenia. In 2013 at the Florence Biennale IX edition, he received the Lorenzo il Magnifico Award in the painting category. In 2014 he was given the Arshile Gorky Honorable Medal of the Republic of Armenia.

== Selected exhibitions ==
=== Solo exhibitions ===
- 2017:
  - The Panthers in My Blossoming Garden, 57th Venice Biennale, Pavilion of the Republic of Armenia, Venice, Italy.
- 2021:
  - The Room of the Riddles, MMoMA, Moscow, Russia.

=== Group exhibitions ===
- 2018:
  - Contemporary Chaos, Vestfossen Kuntslaboratorium, Vestfossen, Norway.
- 2022:
  - On the Wall, Building Gallery, Milan, Italy.
  - InterACTION, Fondazione Made in Cloister, Naples, Italy.
- 2023:
  - Medea, Siracusa Ancient Market, Siracusa, Italy.

== See also ==
- List of Armenian painters
- Culture of Armenia
