= Camper (company) =

Spanish footwear company

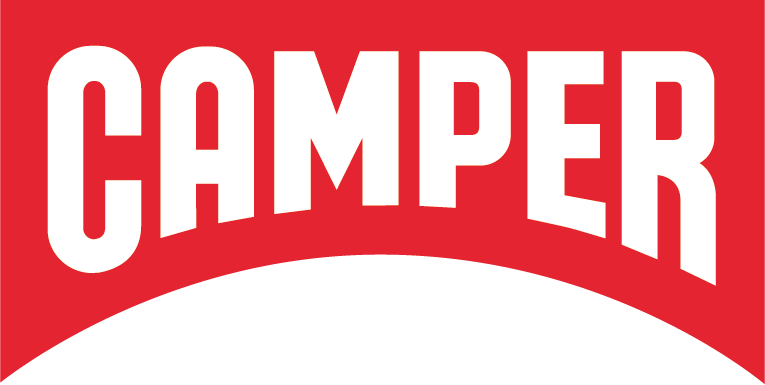
- Industry: Fashion, Restaurant, Hotel
- Founded: Spain (1975)
- Headquarters: Inca, Spain
- Products: Footwear
- Website: camper.com

Camper (/ˈkæmpər/; Catalan: [kəmˈpe], 'farmer') is a footwear company with headquarters in Mallorca, Spain. Lorenzo Fluxà founded the company in 1975. The Camper brand is marketed globally and is present in 40 countries, with more than 400 stores and sales of around 4 million pairs of shoes annually.

== Company overview ==
In 1877, Antonio Fluxà, a Mallorcan cobbler, introduced the first sewing machines on the island and introduced a mechanized approach to shoe making.

In 1975, Lorenzo Fluxà, grandson of Antonio Fluxà, founded Camper.

In 1981, the first Camper store opened in Barcelona, Spain.

In 1992, Camper opened stores in Paris and Milan. An American retail store opened in 1999 in New York City.

In 2005, Camper began brand diversification by launching a hotel concept, Casa Camper, in Barcelona and later in Berlin, and Dos Palillos, a Michelin-starred restaurant in the Raval district of Barcelona.

In 2006, Camper launched Camper Together, a collaboration project with brand partners to create singular products and stores.

In 2011, Camper became a key sponsorship partner of Emirates Team New Zealand for the Volvo Ocean Race.

In 2012, Miguel Fluxà, representing the fourth generation of the Fluxà family, was appointed CEO.

In 2013, Camper became a key sponsorship partner of Emirates Team New Zealand in the 34th America's Cup.

In 2013, after two years as head of menswear at Mugler and eight seasons of collaboration via Camper Together, Romain Kremer began working as main collection consultant at Camper. He was named the brand's creative director in 2014.

In 2018, Queen Letizia awarded Camper the National Special Achievement Award for Large Fashion Companies as part of the 5th National Fashion Industry Awards in Spain.

In 2019, Finnish shoe designer Achilles Ion Gabriel was appointed Creative Director of CamperLab.
