= Culture of Penang =

This article is about the culture of the Malaysian state of Penang.

== Arts and Culture ==
The Penang State Museum houses artifacts and cultural exhibits. The present building, which was formerly the Penang Free School, is actually half a building, the other half of the building having been destroyed by aerial bombing during World War II. A bronze cast of Captain Francis Light, used to stand outside the museum building. It has since returned to Fort Cornwallis where it was first unveiled by the colonial administration. A small museum, it has a fine collection of old photographs, maps and historical records charting the growth of Penang from the days of Francis Light.

The Penang State Art Gallery and the Pinang Gallery showcase the works of local artists. A newer gallery, the USM ABN-Amro Arts and Cultural Centre, located at Beach Street, was established in 2002 to promote art awareness among Penang citizens. The USM ABN-Amro Arts and Cultural Centre closed down in early December 2006 due to lack of patronage. The Universiti Sains Malaysia Museum and Gallery possesses a large ethnographic and performing arts section with a special exhibition on wayang kulit. The art gallery features works by Malaysian artists. Other establishments promoting art awareness include the Alliance française de Penang and Hotel Bellevue.

Penang has a relatively active arts scene. The Penang Philharmonic is a government-supported musical house for Penang Philharmonic Orchestra and the chorus, the Penang Philharmonic Chamber Choir (previously known as Voices of Penang Philharmonic) . The Penang Symphony Orchestra is another amateur orchestra. The Fingerprints Chamber Choir is a leading chamber choir, with members comprising mainly singing teachers and advanced singing students. It has won prizes at several competitions and performs regularly at various festivals and recitals in the country. Other ensembles include the Penang State Chinese Orchestra (a Chinese instrumental orchestra), ProArt Chinese Orchestra, and many other school-based musical groups.

The Actors' Studio Greenhall performs stage plays from time to time.

Penang hosts the annual Penang-YTL Arts Festival in December, with theatrical performances, contemporary and traditional dances, art and photography exhibitions, as well as concerts of classical and modern music. The programmes are drawn up by the Penang Arts Council every year and are partly sponsored by the YTL Group of Companies, a corporate patron of the arts scene in Malaysia.

Penang is also home to the indigenous boria, a fading art form with singing and dancing once popular among the local Malay community.

Lion dance is an ancient art form brought from China by early Chinese immigrants, and over time has evolved into a distinctive Malaysian style. The earliest record of lion dancing in Malaysia was the official registration of a Penang lion dance troupe back in 1903 but it is indisputable that the Chinese community had been practising it long before then. The Chinese place special significance to this dazzling form of art, associating it good luck, power, strength, majesty and happiness. Today lion dance remains actively performed especially during Chinese New Year and also during the opening of new businesses.

== Festivals and Carnivals ==
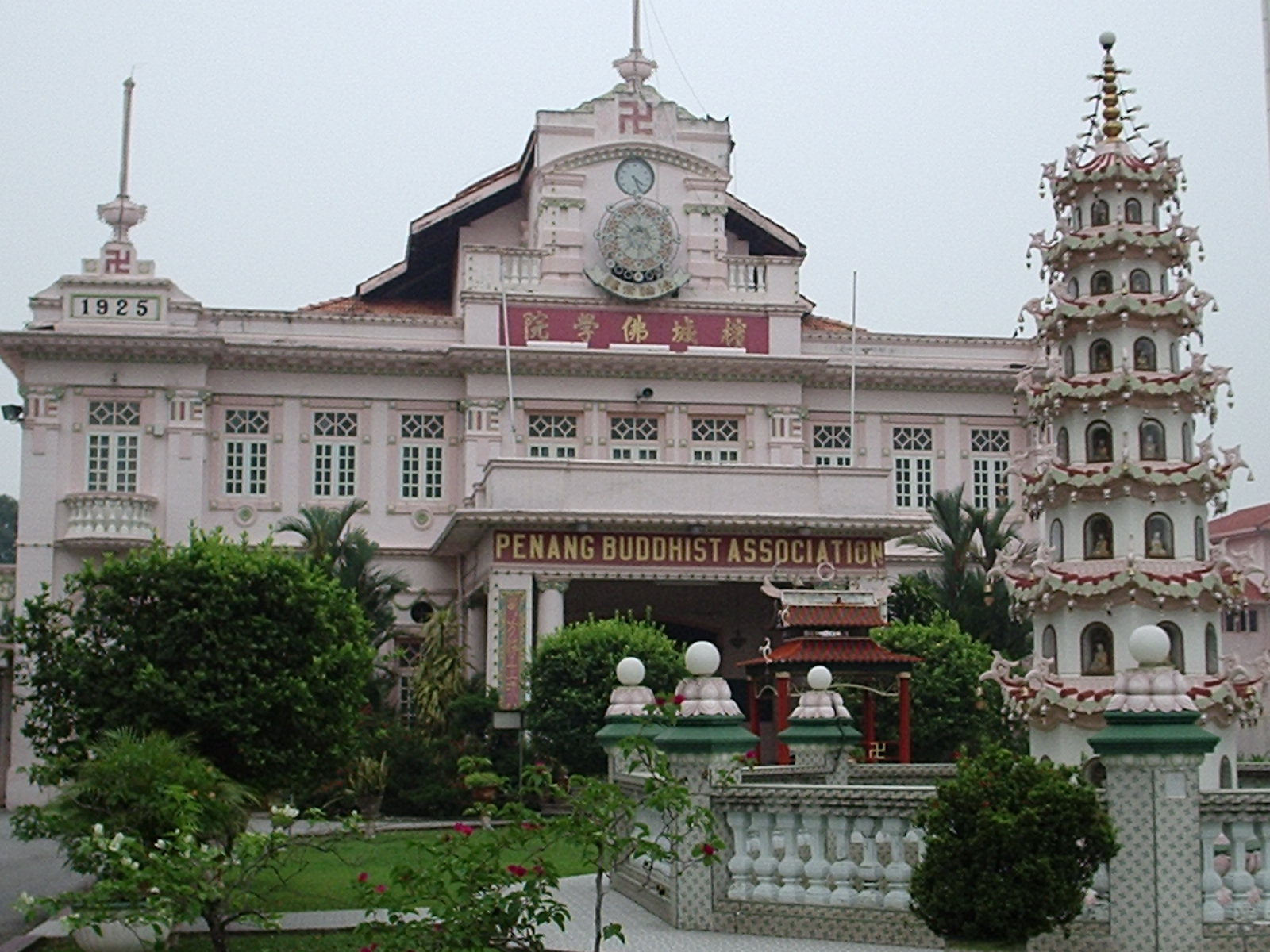
The Penang Buddhist Association on Anson Road, built in 1925

George Town Festival is a month-long Festival celebrating the Arts, Heritage and Culture in George Town, Penang. Typically held within the month of July since the inauguration of George Town as a UNESCO World Heritage Site on 7 July 2008 together with Melaka, heritage celebrations were held to commemorate this historical event. With the support of the Penang State Government, the Festival grew from a 3-day heritage celebration in July 2009 to become a month long celebration of cultural performances, theatre, opera, music, dance, film, art exhibitions and more in 2011 and 2012. The 2011 George Town Festival featured a host of local talents during the "Tapestry of Culture" themed heritage celebrations, juxtaposed against international acts such as "Vertical Road" by Akram Khan Company. The 2012 George Town Festival received over 78 local and foreign proposals and showcased local talents, particularly in the Opening Event entitled "Silat - Our Heritage for the World", "Live Heritage" - the theme of the 3-day heritage celebrations, Tony Yap Company and Lee Wushu, together with large international acts such as "The Manganiyar Seduction" by Roysten Abel, "Blinded Mind" by Susanna Leinonen Company, The Philippine Madgrigal Singers, Sbaek Thom - Cambodian Shadow Puppets by Cambodia Living Arts, the Tilak Fernando Dance Troupe from Sri Lanka and the Australian Youth Band. The 2013 Festival promises to be bigger and better.

Chingay is a Penang festival which is held every year as part of the Chinese New Year celebrations and also during the birthdays of Chinese Deities. Its history stretched back to 1880. At the turn of the century, Penang became famous for its "Giant Flags Procession". Flag bearers carry and balance giant flag poles (some 10m high) on their shoulders, chins and foreheads then tossing them to the next bearers. Chingay later spread to other states and Singapore.

Penang hosts the annual Penang International Dragon Boat Festival. Established in 1979, this event attracts competitors from as far as the United States, Japan, South Africa and the Netherlands. Dragon boat races can trace their roots back to ancient China and have been going on in Penang waters since 1934. The current festival is held at the Teluk Bahang reservoir.

Pesta Pulau Pinang is a lively and colourful carnival held every year in December. This event were held by Penang State Financial Department under Tapak Pesta and Expo Units and the festivity includes open-air concerts, variety shows, food bazaars, fun fairs, exhibitions, pet shows, a beauty pageant and many more.

Wesak Day is considered as most sacred celebration for the Buddhists as the day commemorates with Lord Buddha's birth, enlightenment and final Nibbana. Wesak Day's night procession is an annual event organised in Penang since 1949 until present days. It was organised entirely by Buddhist community in Penang and funded through donations. The annual grand float procession usually starts at 6.00 pm, from the Malaysian Buddhist Association in Burma Road. The procession floats are beautifully decorated with colourful flowers and bright lights. Buddhist monks will conduct chanting and sprinkling holy water throughout the procession journey.

Thaipusam is an annual religious event celebrated by Hindus to commemorate the victory of Lord Murugan over the demons. It falls on a full moon day on the Tamil tenth month of Thai. Devotees and penitents can be seen bearing kavadis, and piercing their bodies with hooks and spears without seeming to cause any pain or harm as an act of faith and atonement. The centre of the celebration takes place at the Nattukkottai Chettiar Temple Penang at Waterfall Road where the chariot procession ends.

As in other places with a substantial population of Chinese people, Chinese New Year is a grand affair in Penang, celebrated with firecrackers, worshipping at temples, lion dance, sumptuous feasts and open houses. It is also an occasion for family reunions, visiting friends and relatives, and gift exchanges.

Hari Raya Aidilfitri is a Muslim celebration which comes after one month of fasting during Ramadhan. It is a joyous celebration which brings families together and it is the time to seek forgiveness from one another. The Hindu festival Deepavali, also known as the Festival of Lights, celebrates the triumph of good over evil.

The Zhong Yuan Festival (known in Hokkien as Phor Tor (普度)) is celebrated on a grand scale by the Penang Chinese. The Chinese believe that on the 15th day of the seventh lunar month, the gates of underworld would open and the dead souls whom without any descendants to conduct ancestral worship for them would be allowed to roam in the living realm to receive food and offerings. The Chinese would placate the 'hungry ghosts' by organizing big worship celebration that include religious rituals, burning incense, making food offerings and performing Chinese opera or getai on makeshift stages. At the end of the month-long festival, a giant effigy of Da Shi Ye (大士爷) who is maintaining the law and order of the 'hungry ghosts' will be sent off and burned. Throughout the month, it is ill-advised to travel, go out at night or to get marry. This tradition is more popular among Oversea Chinese communities because many Chinese migrants in the past often passed away without any offspring or descendants, therefore they do not have anyone to conduct the ancestral worship for them. Many Oversea Chinese communities will therefore conduct grand seventh lunar month worship celebration as a way to honour those Chinese migrants.

== Artists ==
International Artist Goh Lee Kwang born in Penang.

== Nightlife ==
Penang comes alive at night, with many lively night spots such as pubs, bars, bistros, discos, cafes, and even roadside stalls. The most popular places to go to are Upper Penang Road with its many trendy pubs such as Soho Free House, Momo, Fame, Mois, Carmen and Slippery Senoritas; Chulia Street which is awash with many little bars popular with travellers; Pulau Tikus with its Belissa Row and the likes of Orange Bar and Segafredo; and Gurney Drive with its Gurney Walk and Gurney Place. The seaside resort of Batu Ferringhi and Tanjung Bungah also feature many hotel lounges such as Asmara Lounge, The Lounge and Sunset Lounge. Lower-priced eating places like the ubiquitous mamak stalls open until early in the morning, whose signature dishes are roti canai (Indian bread) and teh tarik (milk tea). Also, insatiable Penangites often eat until late at night in places like coffee shops.

== See also ==
- Penang
- Malaysia
