= Sisters of the Infant Jesus =

Religious institute for education of the underprivileged

- Abbreviation: SJI, IJS (previously CHIJ)
- Formation: 1666
- Founder: Nicolas Barré, O.M.
- Type: Roman Catholic religious institute Teaching order
- Headquarters: Paris, France
- Leader: Brigitte Flourez
- Website: www.infantjesussisters.org

The Sisters of the Infant Jesus, also known as the Dames of Saint Maur, are a religious institute of the Catholic Church originating from Paris, France and dedicated to teaching.

== History ==
=== Origins ===
In 1659 Barré, who was a respected scholar within his Order, was sent to the monastery of the Order in Rouen. He became widely known as a preacher and his sermons attracted a large audience. In 1662 Barré saw the need for the education of the poor in France.

France in the late 17th century was suffering from the effects of the Franco-Spanish War (1635–1659) and a terrible plague. As a result of his efforts to promote a planned parish mission in the nearby village of Sotteville-lès-Rouen, Barré came to see the suffering of the local population. To enable parents to attend the mission, Barré asked two young women to come and help with the children. One was a local resident, Françoise Duval, 18 years old, the other was Marguerite Lestocq, then aged 20, who, like him, was from Amiens and with whom he had family connections.

He saw the need to make basic education more accessible to all. There were hardly any schools for girls and very few for boys. Most primary school teachers were poorly educated and religious education was almost non-existent; there was profound ignorance of the Catholic faith. In 1662, half the children in Rouen died of famine. Many were homeless and wandered the streets as beggars and, for some, prostitution became one of the few means of livelihood available.

They began to give daily classes to young girls in a room which they were allowed to use, spending that year in this work. Soon three other young women joined them, and two separate schools were opened. Barré would visit the classes frequently, guiding the young women in how to teach and deal with both the children and their parents, drawing upon his own rigorous education under the Jesuits and his experience as a professor. He taught them the value of “instruction and education” and from the beginning he trained the young teachers to respect the uniqueness of each child and to develop each one's potential. The teachers were to speak in a humble, gentle and simple manner so that even the youngest could understand, and they were to teach only what they themselves had adequately grasped.

As the enrollment increased, more schools were established, and four years later, the ladies in charge of these schools began to live in a community under a Superior. This was the beginning of a religious congregation whose main work was the education of the poor.

The year 1666 saw the founding of the Congregation of the Sisters of the Infant Jesus. After several years of teaching in the schools, the five young women were invited by Barré to consider becoming part of a committed community. After some reflection, they felt that they were indeed called to this way of life and agreed. These women were not bound by religious vows or confined to a cloister. They were free to serve the local community and provide free education for poor children. They committed themselves to this in a legal document drawn up in 1669, becoming called the Charitable Teachers of the Infant Jesus (French: Maîtresses Charitable de l'Infant Jésus). As part of their living in trust in God, it was established that the material needs of the schools were to be handled by women outside the new community.

=== Expansion and division ===
Due to his declining health, in 1675 Barré was sent to the Minim monastery in Paris. Though limited in his activities, he promoted new foundations of his "charitable schools of Providence", starting with two, Saint Jean en Grèves and Saint Nicolas des Champs, training teachers, both men and women for them. He urged his teachers not to wait until pupils arrived at the school; they were to seek out especially those who might be at risk. He also set up trade schools so that girls could earn a living. Again, the education offered was to be entirely free and any profit derived from the pupils’ work was to go to them.

In 1677 Barré began to send teachers to other locations in France, starting with his native Picardy, reaching as far as New France in North America. These women were not part of a religious institute, and so were free to serve their local communities as needed, without the barriers that status would have imposed at that time.

Around that time, he acquired a house located on the Rue Saint Maur in the 6th arrondissement of Paris (now called the Rue de l'Abbé Grégoire), which was to become the motherhouse of the institute. In 1677 a convent was established in Rue Saint Maur, Paris (ii) and the Sisters were subsequently known as the "Dames of St. Maur". In 1678, Barré founded a novitiate for the sisters on the Seine.

The Daughters of Providence were members of a Catholic religious congregation for women founded in 1643, by a pious widow, Marie Polaillon (née de Lumague) under a Rule of Life drawn up by Vincent de Paul. The Daughters would profess annual vows of obedience, chastity, service and stability. In 1681 several houses of the congregation merged with the Sisters of the Congregation of the Holy Infant Jesus, becoming the Sisters of St. Maur and of Providence. A number of ‘Little Charitable Schools’ were established throughout France. In 1683 Mother Françoise Duval, one of the foundresses, was sent to open a school in Lisieux. At the time of Barré's death in 1686, there were over 100 schools being operated by the Sisters of the Holy Infant Jesus throughout France.

Throughout his life, Barré had refused to allow the schools to accept benefices as a means of support, determined to place his trust in God alone, and was followed in this commitment by the teachers of the institute. Upon his death, however, the lay trustees in Paris and Rouen, who were in charge of the finances of the schools and the teachers who staffed them, strongly disagreed over whether or not to continue this practice.

This was eventually referred to the royal court, and, in 1691, King Louis XIV divided the Institute into three independent groups, with motherhouses in Rouen, Paris and Lisieux.

- The Sisters in the original communities became known as the Sisters of Providence of Rouen and in 1921 became a congregation of diocesan right, under the authority of the local bishops where they served, with a missionary outreach in Madagascar and Central Africa.
- The group based in Lisieux also became a diocesan congregation.
- The Sisters of St Maur in Paris became an institute of pontifical right with communities in five continents.

=== Current era ===
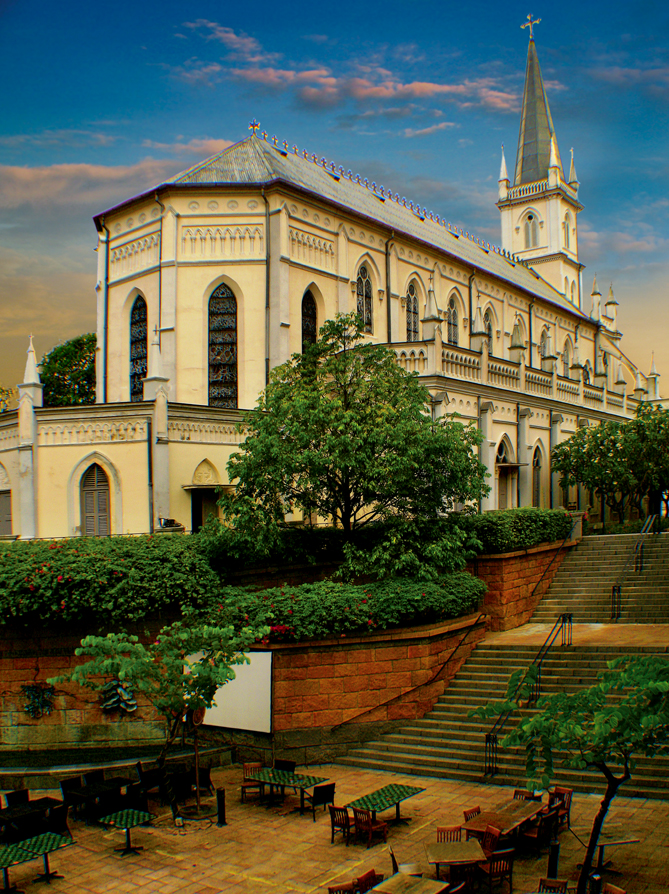
Congregation of the Holy Infant Jesus in Singapore

==== Southeast Asia ====
In 1849 a Catholic missionary in the Straits Settlements, Reverend Father Jean-Marie Beurel, a native of Saint-Brieuc in France, suggested to the colonial governor, William John Butterworth, that it might be worthwhile to found a charitable organisation for girls next to the Church in Victoria Street. In August 1852, Beurel bought the house at the corner of Victoria Street and Bras Basah Road. Beurel then appealed to the Superior General of the congregation in France for Sisters to run a school.

===== Malaysia =====
Four Sisters were sent to the East. After a long and perilous voyage, one had died at sea, three of them landed at Penang in April 1852. That same year, the three Sisters established a convent that contained an orphanage and school in Penang. In September 1852, the Congregation sent four Sisters to Penang, with Mother Mathilde Raclot in charge, to guide and support the group of sisters who had arrived earlier. The school, Convent Light Street (Malay: SMK Convent Lebuh Light), is Penang's oldest girls' school and has occupied its current site along Light Street near historic George Town for over 150 years. While on the peninsula, the Sisters continued establishing schools with help from the local community such as Kuala Lumpur's oldest girls' school Convent Bukit Nanas and the only Chinese convent girls school Convent Datuk Keramat in Penang. In 1952, St Bernadette's convent school was built in Pusing Road, Batu Gajah Perak with land donated and funds raised from communities. During World War II, the Japanese invaded Malaya and either took over or closed down many such mission schools, notably the iconic Convent Primary School in the hills of Tanah Rata. The Tanah Rata convent is one of the few in the region which still contains an operating school and a church. Today, CHIJ schools can be found in most states and many major cities and they continue to educate local girls of all races and religions.

===== Singapore =====
In February 1854, three Sisters led by Rev. Mother Mathilde Raclot arrived in Singapore from Penang and set up the convent in Singapore at Victoria Street. Soon they also started a Convent Orphanage and a Home for Abandoned Babies as they found day-old babies were being left at their doorstep.

To raise funds for their work, Mother Mathilde taught needlework to her fellow nuns and their students, and they sold their products to the wives of the local Chinese merchants. The school became well-known and within ten years, the enrollment had increased to 300. Secondary education began in 1905. Under Mother Hombeline, the expansion programme continued.

The convent occupied a full street block bordered by Bras Basah Road, Stamford Road, Victoria St and North Bridge Road. The iconic church was deconsecrated during the 1980s. Part of the Sisters' quarters has been demolished and converted into SMRT Corporation offices. Most of the original buildings were redeveloped as part of the Heritage Board's preservation scheme. The complex has since been redeveloped into a high-end retail complex called CHIJmes while the church is now a popular attraction for tourists and those interested in history.

The eleven CHIJ schools in Singapore can trace their history to the Victoria Street convent. Satellite schools were founded before and after World War II. The "original" convent school is the present-day CHIJ Secondary and CHIJ Primary schools in Toa Payoh. CHIJ Saint Nicholas Girls' School (CHIJ SNGS) was co-located on the same site and functioned as the Chinese section while CHIJ Secondary and Primary were English-medium. After the abolition of vernacular schools, CHIJ SNGS was granted SAP status. All three schools moved out of the Victoria Street complex during the 1980s into larger and more spacious facilities.

The eleven CHIJ schools in Singapore are as follows:

- CHIJ Primary and Secondary (Toa Payoh), Year 1854
- CHIJ Katong Primary and Katong Convent Secondary, Year 1930
- CHIJ St Nicholas Girls’ School, Year 1933
- CHIJ St Theresa's Convent, Year 1933
- CHIJ St Joseph's Convent, Year 1938
- CHIJ Our Lady Queen of Peace, Year 1955
- CHIJ Our Lady of the Nativity, Year 1957
- CHIJ Our Lady of Good Counsel, Year 1960
- CHIJ Kellock, Year 1964

==== East Asia ====
===== Japan =====
In 1872, Mother Mathilde led the first group of French nuns to Japan and founded the Saint Maur International School in Yokohama, where they teach and cared for the disadvantaged Japanese women and children. Mother Mathilde Raclot died, aged 97, in 1911 whilst still in Yokohama, Japan, and buried there.

==== Europe ====
The shortage of English teachers forced the Sisters to turn to the British Isles in hopes of recruiting and training potential missionary teachers. In 1909, Mother St Beatrice Foley, who had returned from Singapore, established Drishane Convent in Ireland. It had a "knitting school" for younger girls and was also used to train teachers for the Asian mission. Less than half a decade after opening, the convent was churning out teachers and Sisters and sending them to Asia and South America.

==== South America ====
The Sisters first set foot in South America during the 1960s. Some of the Spanish-speaking Sisters arrived in Peru in 1967 and have since expanded to several other countries in the continent.

== Motto ==
The motto is Simple dans ma vertu, Forte dans mon devoir, which is often translated into "Simple in Virtue, Steadfast in Duty", is featured on the badges of IJ schools worldwide. Depending on the individual school and country, the motto may be in either English or French, or in the native language the school is located in.

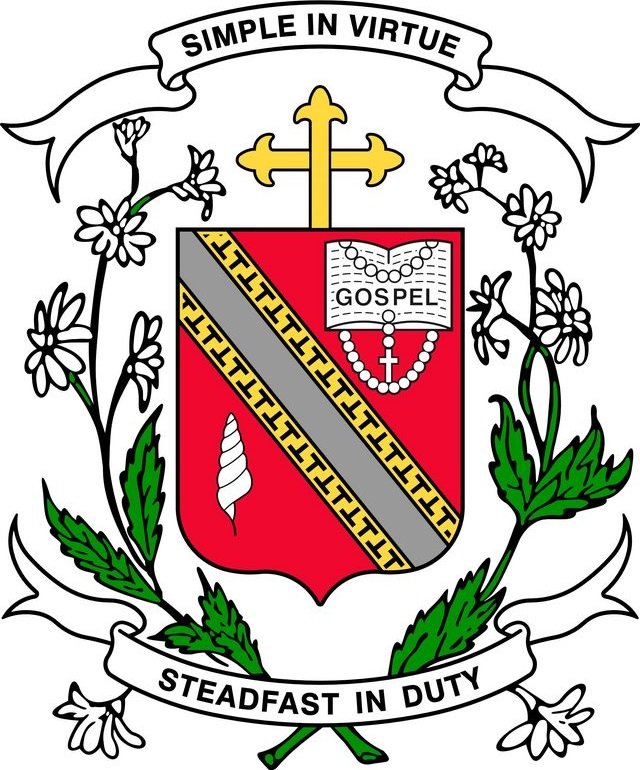
CHIJ crest

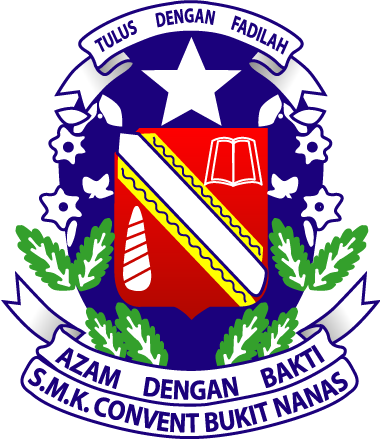
Motto in Malay

== Schools ==
=== England ===
- St Maur's Convent School, Weybridge (merged with St George's College in 2000)

=== Japan ===
- Futaba Gakuen (ja), Yokohama
- Saint Maur International School, Yokohama

=== Thailand ===
- Mary Immaculate Convent School, Mueang Chonburi District
- Convent of the Holy Infant Jesus, Bangkok (English medium)
- Infant Jesus School, Banphai (Thai medium)
- Mahatinonsombull School

=== Malaysia ===
Incomplete list

Primary

- SK Convent Alor Setar, Kedah
- SK Convent Father Barre, Sungai Petani, Kedah
- SK St. Anne's Convent, Kulim, Kedah
- SK Convent Bukit Mertajam, Penang
- SK Convent Butterworth, Penang
- SK Convent Light Street, Penang
- SK Convent Green Lane, Penang
- SK Convent Pulau Tikus, Penang
- SJK (C) Convent Datuk Keramat, Penang (ms)
- SK Convent Aulong, Taiping, Perak (co-educational)
- SK Convent Kota, Taiping, Perak
- SJK (T) St. Teresa Convent, Taiping (co-educational)
- SK Convent Ipoh, Perak
- SK Marian Convent, Ipoh, Perak
- SK Tarcisian Convent, Ipoh, Perak
- SJK (C) Ave Maria Convent, Ipoh, Perak
- SJK (T) St. Philomena Convent, Ipoh
- SK St. Bernadette's Convent, Batu Gajah, Perak
- SK Convent Sitiawan, Perak
- SK Convent Teluk Intan, Perak
- SK Convent Kajang, Selangor
- SK Convent Klang 1 & 2, Selangor
- SK St. Anne's Convent, Port Klang, Selangor
- SK Convent Bukit Nanas 1 & 2, KL
- SK Marian Convent, Setapak, KL
- SK Convent Jalan Peel, KL
- SK Convent Sentul 1 & 2, KL
- SK St. Teresa 1 & 2, Brickfields, KL
- SJK (C) St. Teresa, Brickfields, KL (co-educational)
- SJK (T) St. Joseph, Sentul, KL
- SK Convent Of The Infant Jesus 1 & 2, Malacca
- SJK (C) Notre Dame, Malacca
- SK Convent Batu Pahat, Johor
- SK Convent Muar, Johor
- SK Infant Jesus Covent, Johor Bahru, Johor
- SK Convent Tanah Rata, Cameron Highlands, Pahang (co-educational)
- SK Convent of the Holy Infant Jesus, Seremban (1904–1994)

Secondary

- SMK Convent, Alor Setar, Kedah
- SMK Convent Father Barre, Sungai Petani, Kedah
- SMK St. Anne's Convent, Kulim, Kedah
- SMJK Convent Datuk Keramat, Penang
- SMK Convent Bukit Mertajam, Penang
- SMK Convent Butterworth, Penang
- SMK Convent Green Lane, Penang
- SMK Convent Light Street, Penang
- SMK Convent Pulau Tikus, Penang
- SMJK Ave Maria Convent, Ipoh, Perak
- SMK Convent Ipoh, Perak
- SMK Convent Sitiawan, Perak
- SMK Convent Taiping, Perak
- SMK Convent Teluk Intan, Perak
- SMK St Bernadette's Convent, Batu Gajah, Perak
- SMK Tarcisian Convent, Ipoh
- SMK Convent, Kajang (ms)
- SMK Convent Klang, Selangor
- SMK Convent Bukit Nanas, KL
- SMK Convent Jalan Peel, KL
- SMK Convent Sentul, KL
- SMJK Notre Dame Convent, Malacca
- SMK Infant Jesus Convent, Malacca
- SMK Convent Batu Pahat, Johor
- SMK Convent Muar, Johor
- SMK Infant Jesus Convent, Johor Bahru
- SMK Convent of the Holy Infant Jesus, Seremban (1904–1994)

During the 1980s, all mission schools were nationalised by the government and are no longer directly under their respective religious institutions. The IJ schools are no longer run by nuns but still retain the historic crest and motto, albeit translated in Malay and the cross replaced with a five-pointed star. A rare few may still have a nun working in a chaplaincy or pastoral capacity.

=== Ireland ===
- Drishane Convent
- Scoil Íosa (now part of Malahide Community School)

=== Spain ===
- Colegio Niño Jesús, Burgos
- Colegio Blanca de Castilla, Madrid
- Escola Infant Jesús, Barcelona

=== Singapore ===
Primary

- CHIJ (Katong) Primary
- CHIJ (Kellock)
- CHIJ Our Lady of Good Counsel
- CHIJ Our Lady of the Nativity – formerly CHIJ Ponggol
- CHIJ Our Lady Queen of Peace – formerly CHIJ Bukit Timah
- CHIJ Primary (Toa Payoh)

Secondary

- CHIJ Katong Convent
- CHIJ Secondary (Toa Payoh)
- CHIJ Saint Joseph's Convent
- CHIJ Saint Theresa's Convent

Full

- CHIJ Saint Nicholas Girls' School

== See also ==
- Saint Maur International School, Japan
