= Penang High Court =

State Supreme Court of Penang, Malaysia

- Mahkamah Tinggi Pulau Pinang
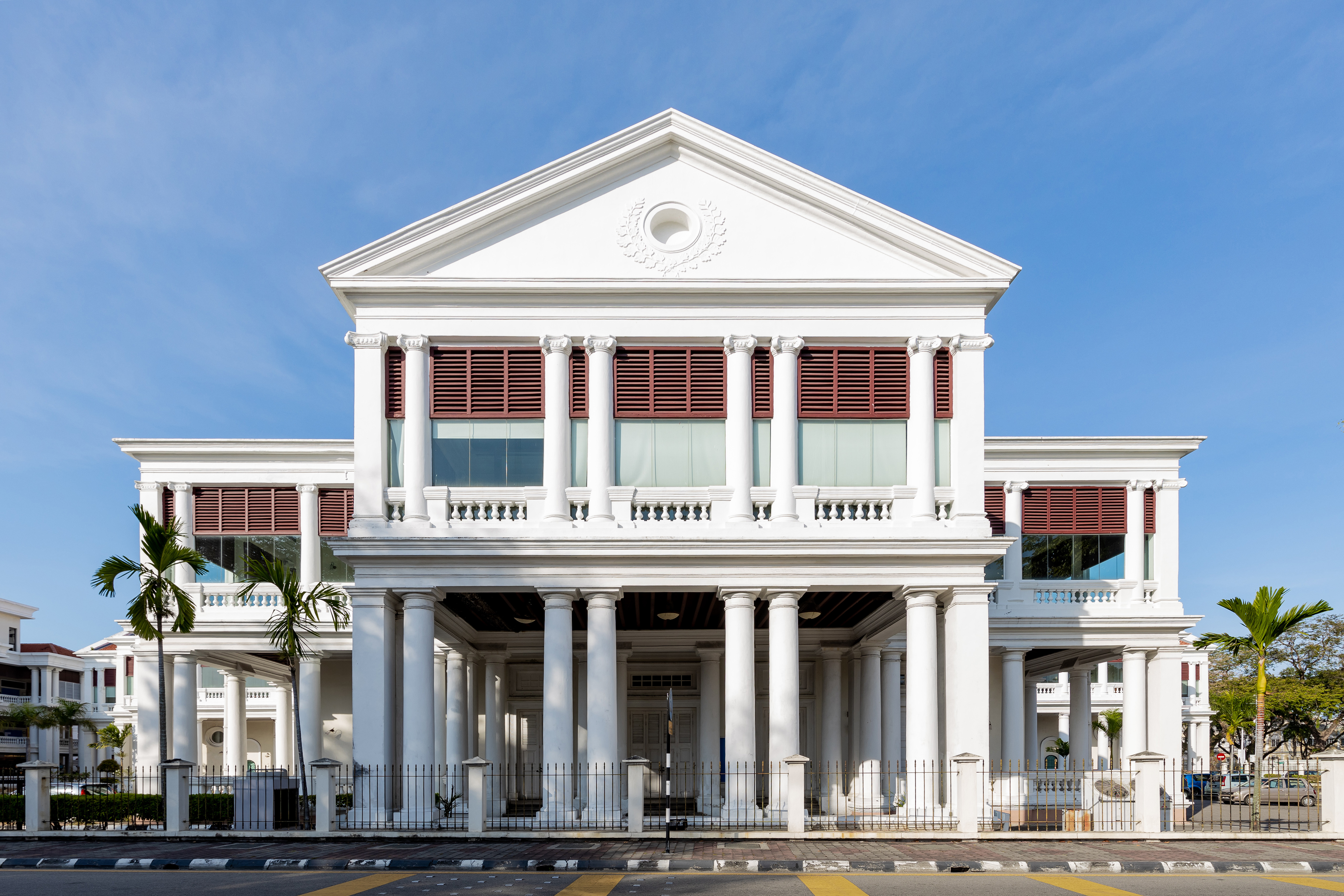
- Interactive map of the Penang High Court area

General information
- Type: High Court
- Architectural style: Palladian
- Location: George Town, Penang, Malaysia
- Coordinates: 5.4207°N 100.3397°E
- Construction started: 1901; 125 years ago
- Inaugurated: 1903; 123 years ago
- Renovated: 2005

UNESCO World Heritage Site
- Type: Cultural
- Criteria: ii, iii, iv
- Designated: 2008 (32nd session)
- Part of: George Town UNESCO Core Zone
- Reference no.: 1223
- Region: Asia-Pacific

The Penang High Court, founded in 1808, is the birthplace of Malaysia's judiciary system. It is housed inside a Palladian-style building at Light Street, George Town, Penang. The High Court sits at the top of Penang's hierarchy of courts.

The current courthouse was built in the 1900s to replace the original structure that was built at the same site in 1809. The Penang High Court, then known as the Supreme Court, had been established in 1808 within Fort Cornwallis nearby, the first such court to be set up in the Malay Peninsula. Its establishment also marked the introduction of a modern legal system in Malaya, which would evolve to become the current judiciary of Malaysia.

The Penang High Court has a long pioneering history in Malaysian judiciary. It was here where the first female judge was admitted into the Straits Settlements and Federated Malay States Bars in the 1920s. Malaysia's first Prime Minister, Tunku Abdul Rahman, was also admitted into the Bar in 1974 within the compound of the Penang High Court.

The courthouse was renovated in the 2000s, during which a new wing was added. Across Light Street, another courthouse housing the Magistrates and Sessions Courts was also completed.

== History ==
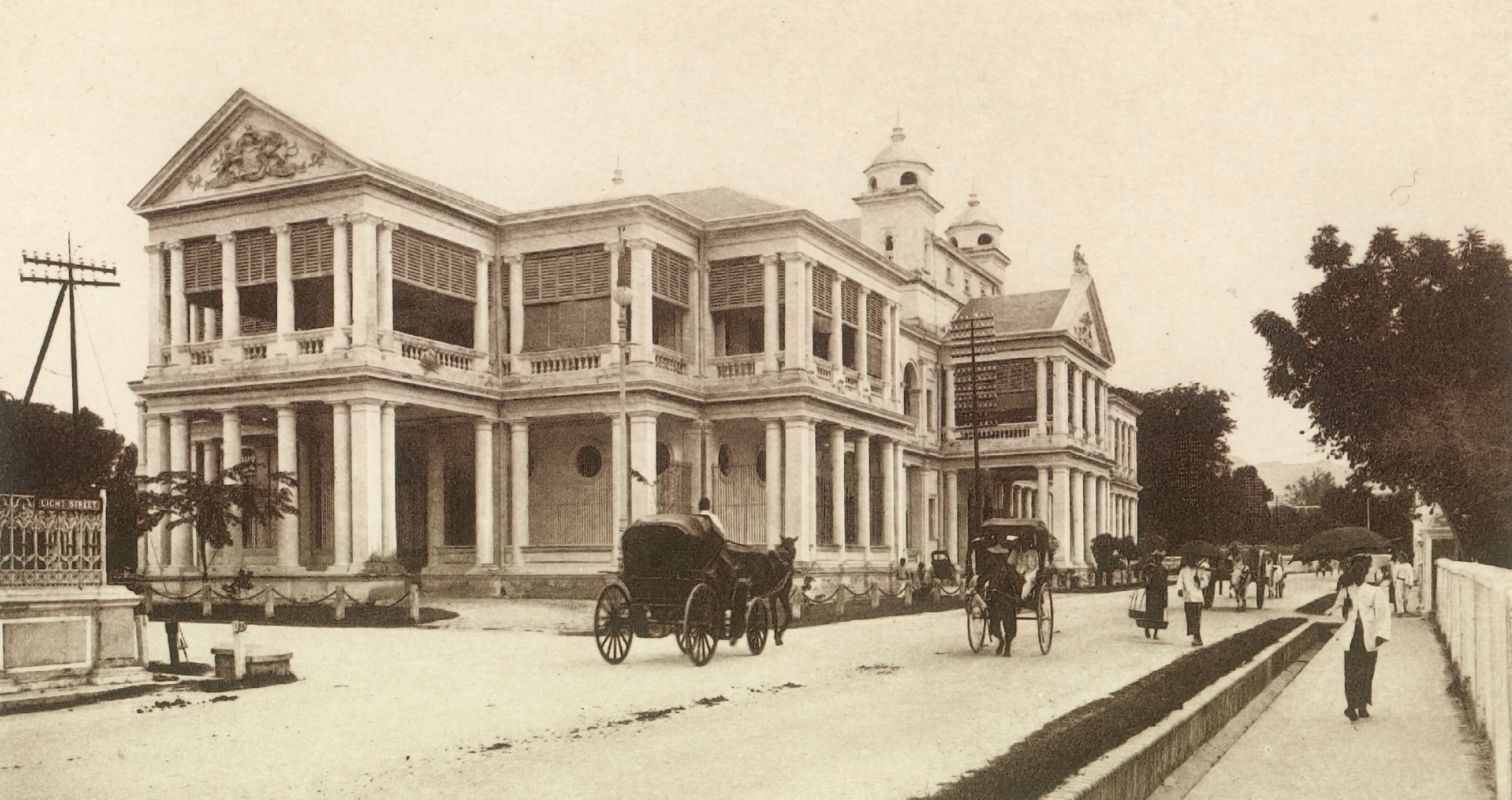
The newly-completed Penang High Court at Light Street in the 1910s

As Penang Island, then named the Prince of Wales Island, flourished into a strategic entrepôt with a growing immigrant population, Captain Francis Light sought the advice of the Governor-General in India on establishing a judicial authority within the new settlement. In 1807, a Royal Charter of Justice was granted by King George III for the British East India Company authorities in Penang to establish a police force and a Court of Justice.

The Supreme Court of Penang was opened at Fort Cornwallis, George Town on 31 May 1808. Sir Edmond Stanley became the first Recorder of the Supreme Court of Penang, (Note: Recorder was a title given to some judges at the time: "Singapore Legal History: The Development of the Court System". Archived from the original on 26 June 2019.) and therefore, of all of Malaya. This event marked the birth of Malaysia's judiciary and legal profession.

Sir Stamford Raffles, who later founded Singapore, also served as the first registrar of the Supreme Court. When the Straits Settlements was formed in 1826 by amalgamating Penang, Singapore and Malacca, the jurisdiction of the Supreme Court of Penang was extended to Singapore and Malacca as well. It was only in 1855 when the judicial centre of the Straits Settlements was finally moved to Singapore.

In 1809, the Supreme Court of Penang was shifted a short distance away to its current grounds at Light Street. The original court building was of wooden construction, topped by an attap roof.

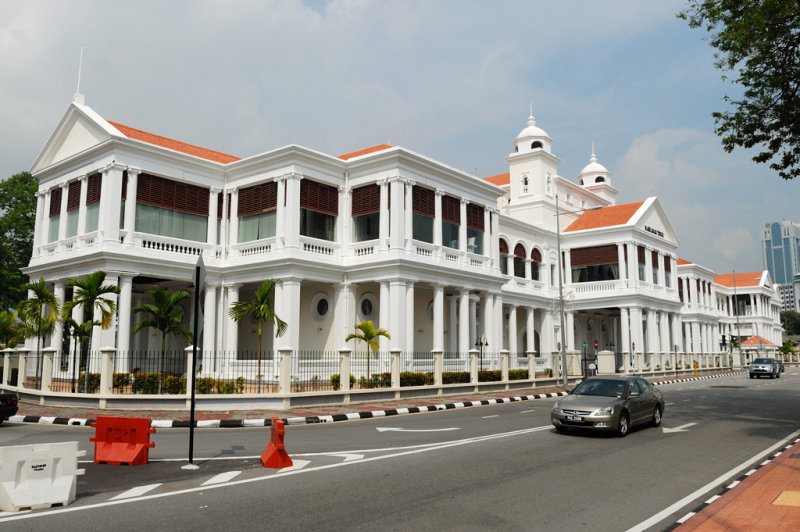
The Penang High Court Building has a history dating back to the 1900s.

The present Palladian-style courthouse, designed by John Henry McCallum, the Surveyor-General of the Straits Settlements, was inaugurated in 1903. Its construction cost $206,678 (Straits dollar). The Palladian architecture is obvious from the courthouse's domed chamber and columns. There were originally statues and emblems on the building as well, although these have since been removed.

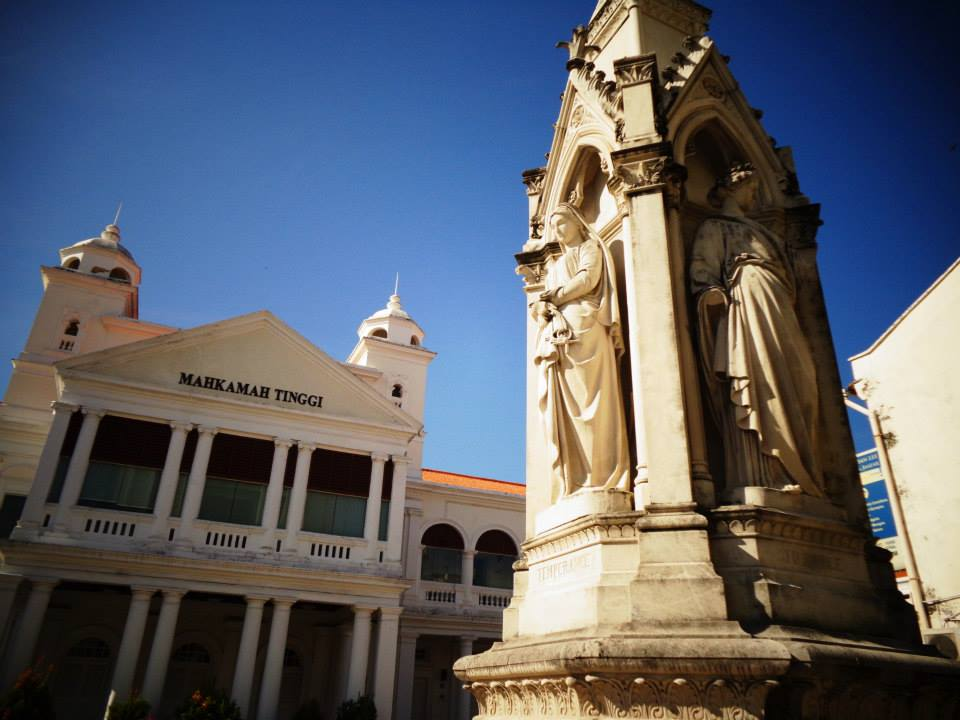
The Logan Memorial, which was created to commemorate a Scottish lawyer who fought for Asian rights in colonial Penang, has been placed in front of the new Sessions Court, just opposite the High Court.

Until the end of the 20th century, the Penang High Court was the scene of some of Malaysia's firsts in the legal field. The first pair of Malayan-born siblings to be called into the Bar were Mr. Lim Khye Seng and Mrs. B. H. Oon, both of whom practised law in the Penang High Court. Mrs. Oon also became the first female Asian lawyer to be admitted into the English Bar in 1926, as well as the first female into the Straits Settlements and Federated Malay States Bars in the following year. In 1974, Tunku Abdul Rahman, who had been the first Malaysian Prime Minister until 1970, was also called into the Bar at the Penang High Court.

Among the other famous lawyers who had once served at the Penang High Court are Karpal Singh and Cecil Rajendra.

The courthouse was renovated in 2005 and a new 3-storey wing was added to the east. Additional courthouses were also built across Light Street; these now house the Magistrates and Sessions Court for the Northeast Penang Island District.

== See also ==
- Kuala Lumpur Courts Complex
- Judiciary of Malaysia
