= Logan Memorial =

Coordinates: 5°25′16″N 100°20′23″E

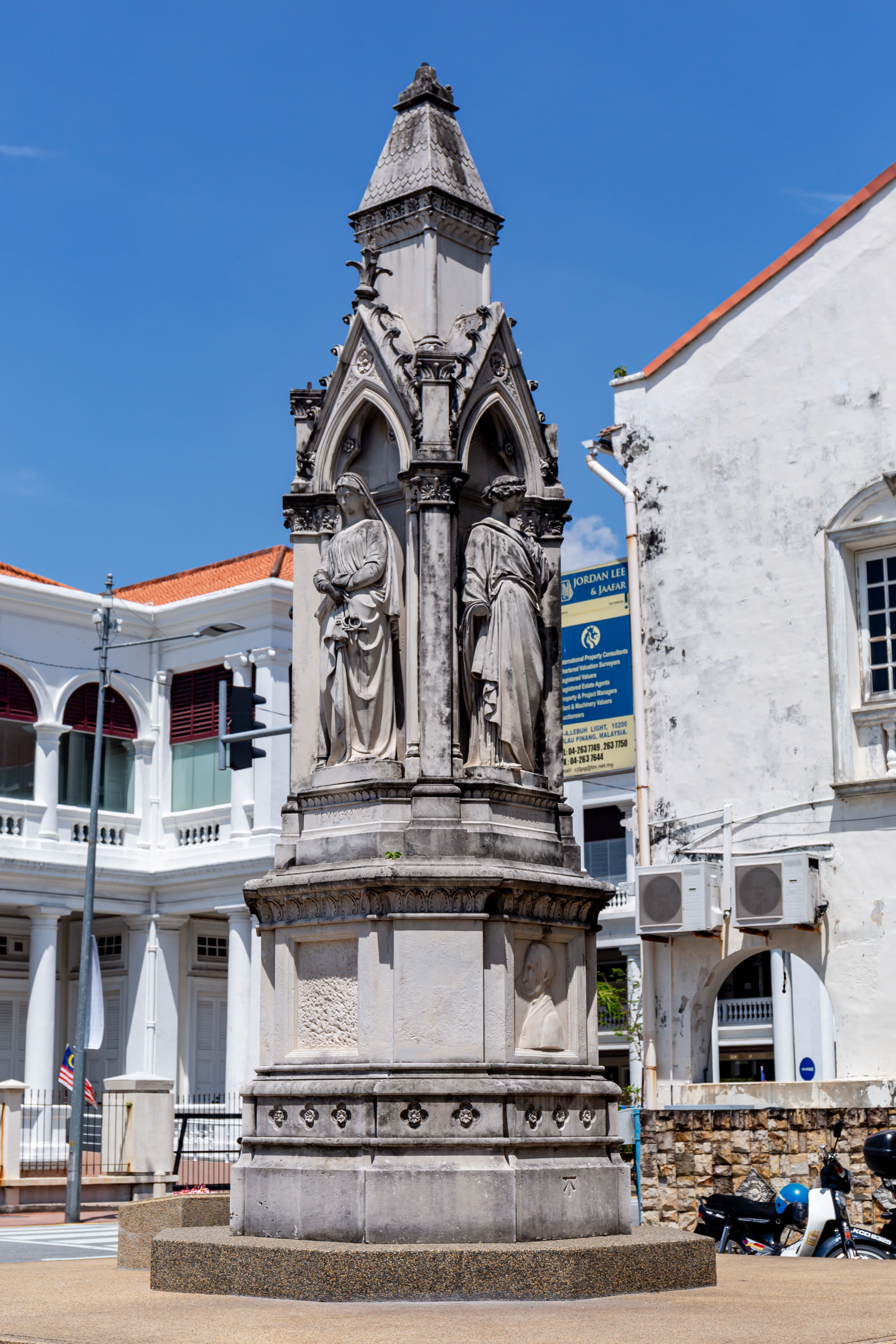
- Interactive map of Logan Memorial
- Location: Situated in front of the Penang High Court, Light Street, George Town, Penang

History
- Built: 1872
- Built for: James Richardson Logan

Site notes
- Architectural style: Gothic

The Logan Memorial is situated in front of the Penang High Court at Light Street in George Town, Malaysia, and was erected in memory of James Richardson Logan, Scottish lawyer and man of letters, who lived in the Straits Settlements in the 19th century.

== Background ==
James Richardson Logan (1819 – 1869) was a lawyer and advocate, trained in Scottish law, who practised in Penang defending, without charge, the rights of non-Europeans. He was also an eminent scholar, founding and writing articles for the influential Journal of the Indian Archipelago and Eastern Asia, and was proprietor of the leading newspaper, the Penang Gazette.

== Memorial ==
Following the death of Logan on 20 October 1869, a meeting was held at the Exchange Rooms in George Town on 25 November to discuss how to perpetuate his memory, and it was decided to erect a monument in Penang where he lived for 20 years. A committee was appointed to invite and collect subscriptions from the three Straits Settlements of Penang, Malacca and Singapore, and in response, a meeting was held in December, 1869, at the Court House in Singapore, attended by most members of the legal profession, to consider how to express their appreciation, it being resolved that the Singapore Bar would contribute funds for the memorial.

On 15 January 1872, at a meeting of the Logan Memorial Committee in Penang, it was confirmed that they had received news that the memorial was complete, and that its erection would be carried out shortly, and it was probably unveiled later that year.

The memorial is a Gazetted Monument under the Antiquity Act 1976.

== Description ==
The monument, built in the Gothic style, features four female allegorical statues representing the Cardinal Virtues of Temperance, Wisdom, Fortitude, and Justice, and holding symbolic items. It is said that it provided a reminder to the judges and lawyers, who passed by the monument when entering the High Court, to uphold the rule of law.

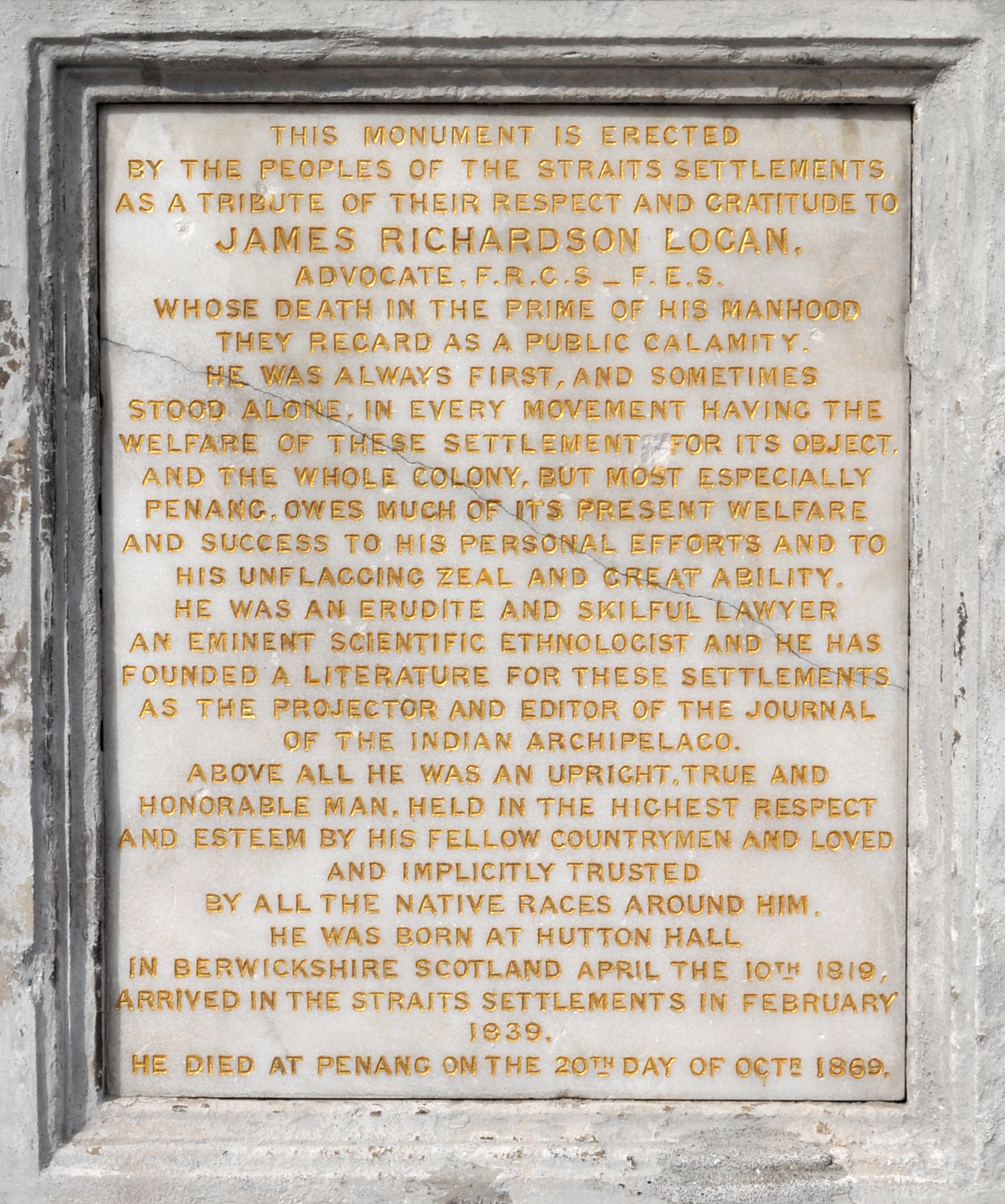
Inscription

Around the base of monument is marble plaque containing a side-profile of the head and shoulders of Logan carved in marble, and another which contains a lengthy inscription honouring his life. The opening words of the inscription state:

"This monument is erected by the peoples of the Straits Settlements as a tribute to their respect and gratitude to James Richardson Logan Advocate. F.R.C.S - F.E.S. whose death in the prime of his manhood they regard as a public calamity."
