= James Richardson Logan =

Lawyer and editor of the Penang Gazette in the Straits Settlements

- Born: 10 April 1819; Berwickshire, Scotland
- Died: 20 October 1869 (aged 50); Penang, Straits Settlements
- Resting place: Old Protestant Cemetery, George Town
- Occupations: lawyer and editor
- Known for: popularised the term "Indonesia"

James Richardson Logan (born 10 April 1819 in Berwickshire, Scotland, died 20 October 1869 in Penang, Straits Settlements) was a lawyer who popularised the name Indonesia after it was coined by the English ethnologist George Windsor Earl. He was an editor of the Penang Gazette and a former student of Earl who in 1850 published the term 'Indu-nesians' to describe the peoples of the region. In 1847, while living in Singapore, Logan founded a scholarly periodical, The Journal of the Indian Archipelago and Eastern Asia, and both edited and contributed to the journal until 1862.

Logan died on 20 October 1869 and is buried at the Old Protestant Cemetery in George Town, Malaysia. A marble memorial, with a relief portrait of him in profile, stands in the compound of the Penang High Court building. Logan Road is named after him.
