= Dallinghoo Wield =

Former civil parish in Suffolk, England

Coordinates: 52.13°N 1.299°E

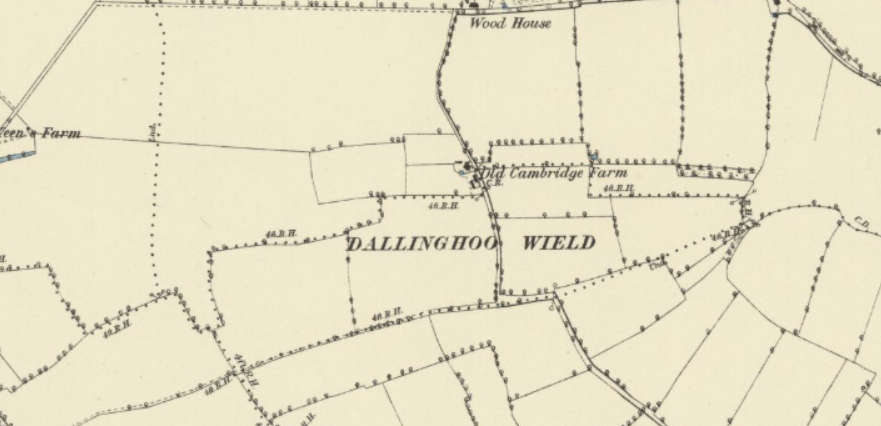
- Map of the parish in 1887.

- Location within Suffolk
- Population: 0 (1971 census)
- Civil parish: Dallinghoo
- District: East Suffolk
- Shire county: Suffolk
- Region: East
- Country: England
- Sovereign state: United Kingdom
- Post town: Woodbridge
- Postcode district: IP13
- UK Parliament: Central Suffolk and North Ipswich

Dallinghoo Wield is a former civil parish 1 mile (1.6 km) from Dallinghoo village, now in the parish of Dallinghoo, in the East Suffolk district, in the county of Suffolk, England. In 1971 the parish had a population of 0. It was claimed to have been the smallest English parish.

== History ==
Dallinghoo Wield was formerly an extra-parochial area, in 1858 it became a civil parish. On 1 April 1985 the parish was abolished and merged into Dallinghoo.

== Geography ==
Dallinghoo Wield covered 38 acres consisting of four small fields and a woodland.
