= Daughters of Providence (Paris) =

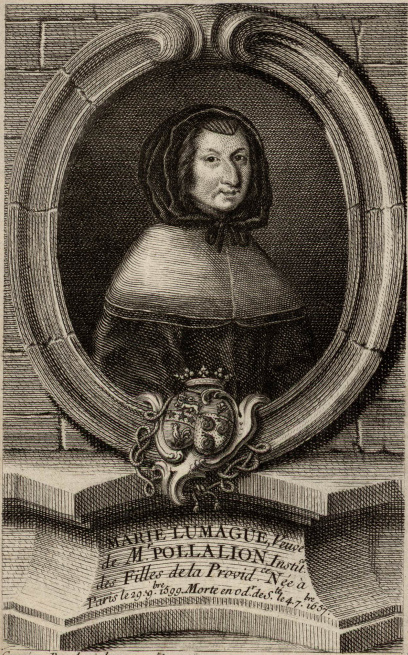
Marie Lumague, founder of the Daughters of Providence

The Daughters of Providence of Paris were members of a Catholic religious congregation for women in 17th-century France. The movement focused on education for the poor, charity, and religious piety.

== Foundation ==
The Daughters of Providence were founded as early as 1630 by a pious widow, Marie Polaillon (née de Lumague). The Daughters had their origins in the "Seminary of Providence" founded in 1643, with the authorization of King Louis XIII. It was intended to provide a shelter to girls who were in situations of peril to their faith. This could be through either poverty or personal circumstances. Examples include poverty and parental neglect. The name of the house was selected as they looked to Divine Providence to supply their needs.

Among the girls who were given shelter in the seminary, those who were capable of providing instruction to the other charges were organized to do that. Among this number were seven whom the foundress felt showed signs of having a religious calling. The Archbishop of Paris, Jean François Paul de Gondi, authorized them to form a religious community, under a Rule of Life drawn up by Vincent de Paul. Their formation was to be a novitiate lasting two years, after which the Daughters would profess annual vows of obedience, chastity, service and stability.

== Dedicated buildings ==
In 1651 the Queen Regent, Anne of Austria, gave the community their first home, a former rest home in the Fauborg Saint-Michel (now Odéon). After this, Archbishop Gondi established several similar communities around the city. Foundations were also made in Metz and Sedan. They remained under the authority of the Archbishop, who would appoint the Superior General of the congregation, while the local Superiors were elected triennially.

== Disestablishment ==
In 1681 several houses of the congregation merged with the Sisters of the newly founded Congregation of the Holy Infant Jesus, founded by Father Nicholas Barré, O.M., dedicated to the education of the poor. The remaining houses soon merged with the Canonesses Regular of the Congregation of Notre Dame, founded by Peter Fourier, dedicated to a similar goal. At that point this congregation ceased to exist.
