= Dallinghoo =

Village in Suffolk, England

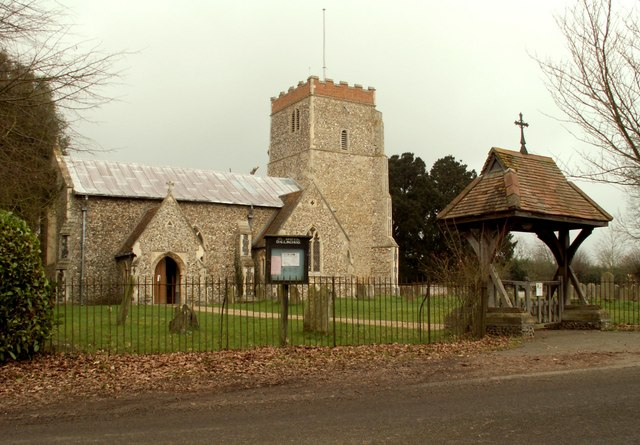
- St. Mary's church, Dallinghoo

- Location within Suffolk
- Population: 171 (2011)
- District: East Suffolk
- Shire county: Suffolk
- Region: East
- Country: England
- Sovereign state: United Kingdom
- Post town: Woodbridge
- Postcode district: IP13
- Dialling code: 01728
- UK Parliament: Central Suffolk and North Ipswich

Dallinghoo is a village and civil parish about three miles (5 km) north of Woodbridge, East Suffolk, Suffolk, England. In 2011 the parish had a population of 171.

== History ==
On 1 April 1985, the separate parish of Dallinghoo Wield (which covered just 38 acres and was uninhabited) was merged with Dallinghoo parish. Prior to merger, Dallinghoo Wield was claimed to be the smallest civil parish in England.

== Location ==
Dallinghoo is formed from Church Road to the west, Pound Hill to the south and branches northeast after the centre of the village. Dallinghoo Village Hall is on Church Road near its junction with Pound Hill, a little north of the village at 52.1464°N 1.3124°E.

== Buildings ==
Dallinghoo's church was originally a large building with a central tower but the chancel has since been destroyed. The Church also had connections with nearby Letheringham Abbey.

== People ==
Dallinghoo is the birthplace of Francis Light, founder of Penang in Malaysia and father of William Light, the founder of Adelaide in Australia.

== Wickham Market Hoard ==
Dallinghoo was featured in the press in 2009 when £500,000 worth of Iron Age, Iceni gold staters were found in a field.

Described as "the largest hoard of British Iron Age gold coins to be studied in its entirety", the hoard was discovered in March 2008 by Michael Darke, using a metal detector. After excavation of the site, a total of 825 coins were found, and by the time the hoard was declared treasure trove, 840 coins had been discovered. The coins date from 40 BC to 15 AD.
