= Thane Camus =

American TV personality and actor (born 1970)

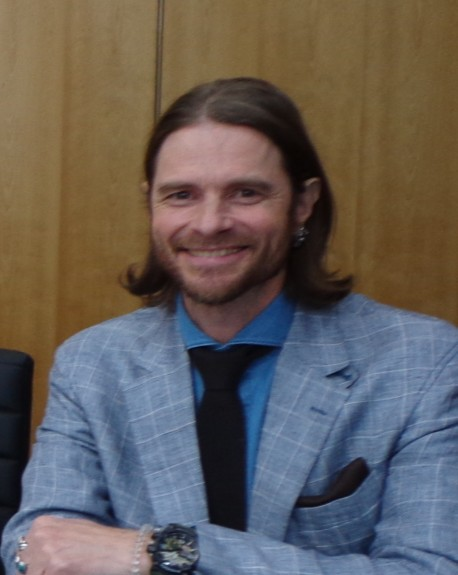
- Thane Camus in 2017
- Born: Thane Alexander Camus; November 27, 1970 (age 55); New York, U.S.
- Education: Saint Maur International School
- Occupations: TV personality, Youtuber
- Website: http://ameblo.jp/thane/

Thane Alexander Camus (/kəˈmu/; born November 27, 1970) is an American TV personality and actor in Japan.

== History ==
=== Early life ===
Camus was born in New York on November 27, 1970. His mother remarried a Japanese manager of a Middle Eastern airline, and the family left the United States when Camus was 6 months old, living in the Bahamas, Greece, Lebanon, and Egypt before settling in Fujisawa around 1976 or 1977. Camus also lived in Singapore for two years from fourth to sixth grade, where he took remedial English classes.

Camus was the first male graduate of Saint Maur International School once it became coeducational. He entered Hofstra University, Long Island, but dropped out before he graduated.

=== Career in Japan ===
Shortly after returning from Hofstra in 1991, Camus made his first TV appearance on NHK, helping to present an English educational program. He starred as the alien character "Chanto Seijin" in a popular 1996 television commercial.

Starting around this time, Camus was a regular on the Sanma Akashiya show Sanma's Super Karakuri TV for many years, in which he quizzed Japanese passers-by in English and foreigners in Japanese on the streets of Tokyo, and has appeared as a special guest on multiple variety shows.

During this phase of his career, Camus was affiliated with R&A Promotion, the talent agency of Motoko Inagawa, which employed many prominent foreign celebrities in Japan. He worked as both a staff "talent" and as a manager, but left the agency in December 2004 and founded his own agency, taking a significant pay cut in the process. R&A then sued Camus, alleging that he breached a 10-year contract signed in 2002. According to journalist Yohei Hoshino, R&A also pressured television networks and advertising agencies to blacklist Camus in the wake of his departure. Camus won the lawsuit at both the District Court and High Court.

Since leaving R&A, Camus has focused on drama and narration work as well as YouTube. As of 2019, Camus is a co-host on J-Trip Plan, a travel show in English on the Japanese national broadcaster NHK.

== Personal life ==
His great-uncle was Albert Camus.

Camus has a younger sister with autism, and serves as a director of a non-profit organization promoting artistic opportunities for disabled people.

== Filmography ==
=== Commercials ===
- Street Fighter II' Plus (1993) (Vega, Balrog in Japan)

=== Theatrical animation ===
- Crayon Shin-chan: The Legend Called: Dance! Amigo! (2006)

=== Video games ===
- Valkyria Chronicles 4 (2018) (Xanthus)

=== Television ===
- Sakura (2002) (Robert Hoffman)
- Zero: Black Blood (2014) (Ring)
- Garo: Makai no Hana (2014) (Luke/Stellas)
- Kamen Rider Ghost (2016) (Steve Bills)
- Segodon (2018) (Harry Smith Parkes)
