= Saint Maur International School =

Private day college-prep school in Naka-ku, Yokohama, Kanagawa, Japan

- サンモール · インターナショナルスクール

Location
- 83 Yamate-cho; Naka-ku, Yokohama, Kanagawa; Japan
- 35°26′7″N 139°39′9″E

Information
- Type: Private, Day, College-prep; International school
- Motto: Simple Dans Ma Vertu, Forte Dans Mon Devoir (Simple in virtue, steadfast in duty)
- Religious affiliation: Roman Catholic
- Established: 1872
- Founders: Sisters of the Holy Infant Jesus
- Head of School: Mrs. Annette Levy
- Grades: P–12
- Enrollment: 480 (2016–17)
- Colors: Grey and red
- Team name: Cougars
- Accreditation: NEASC, IBO
- Affiliations: CIS, EARCOS, JCIS
- Website: stmaur.ac.jp

Saint Maur International School, established in 1872 in Yokohama within the Greater Tokyo Area, is the oldest international school in Japan. The school, which is co-educational, caters to students of all nationalities and faiths from ages 2½ through high school age. Saint Maur International School is located in a historically international district in Yokohama, Japan, one of the few places where foreigners were allowed entrance into the country during the Sakoku policy of the late Edo period.

== History ==
Established in 1872 by the missionary Sisters of the Holy Infant Jesus from the Saint Maur Rue in Paris, France, led by Mother Mathilde Raclot. Saint Maur began with "direct support received from over 15 legations, such as the United Kingdom, the United States of America, France, Austria, Holland, and Germany." Although it is a Catholic school, the school emphasizes the philosophy and approach of "acceptance of all." In 1884, the buildings were devastated by a typhoon and in 1894, an earthquake demolished the school. Its Japanese medium sister school, Futaba Gakuen (jp), was founded in 1901 for local girls. The school was closed during World War II. In 1947 Sister Carmel O’Keeffe (1918–2011) was sent to Japan to reopen the school and would serve as principal from 1967 to 1991.

== Campus and facilities ==
The Fine Arts Center consists of a 400-seat auditorium, specialist rehearsal and practice rooms for band class. In addition, the school purchased property located three minutes away from the school campus in 2003 and built an outdoor sports complex called Peverley Place. A Science Center was erected and completed in February 2011, housing a chemistry lab, physics lab biology lab and general science and robotics lab. The gymnasium was rebuilt and inaugurated in April 2021. It is called the Cougar Café, Sports and Activity Center. It houses the cafeteria now called Cougar Café as well as the gymnasium, three activity rooms and a number of changing rooms for students and opposition teams.

== Curriculum ==
Saint Maur follows certain aspects of the American school system, such as age group nomenclature and academic calendar.

In addition to the Montessori Preschool, the school is subdivided into the Elementary School (Grades 1 to 5), Middle School (Grades 6 to 8) and High School (Grades 9 to 12). An Ecole Française ("French School") was opened in 2007 and is available to children from maternelle to cours moyen 2 (ages 5/6 to 10/11). The ecole also provides programs for students in middle and high school who wish to continue learning French as their primary language via the National Centre for Distance Education (CNED).

Students entering Grade 9 (first year of high school) prepare to take the IGCSE in Grade 10 and go on to the IB Diploma Programme for Grades 11 and 12. There are options to take Advanced Placement classes and the PSAT or SAT exams.

== Notable alumni ==
- Thane Camus – actor
- Miki Irie - model and actor
- Hana Kamihara - Japanese Radio, TV host)
- Karen Kirishima - model
- Kanako Michi - actor and singer
- Yuuki Kurei – singer of Kimaguren (ja)
- Thomas Nozomi de Lencquesaing – actor and model
- Nicola Pagett – British actress
- Yuki Shimizu - manga artist
- Shanti Snyder – Japanese-American singer and songwriter
- Mie Yamaguchi – TV presenter

== See also ==
- Sisters of the Holy Infant Jesus
- ja:学校法人雙葉学園 (Gakkō Hōjin Futaba Gakuen)
