= Penang State Assembly Building =

Legislative assembly of Penang

- Bangunan Dewan Undangan Negeri Pulau Pinang
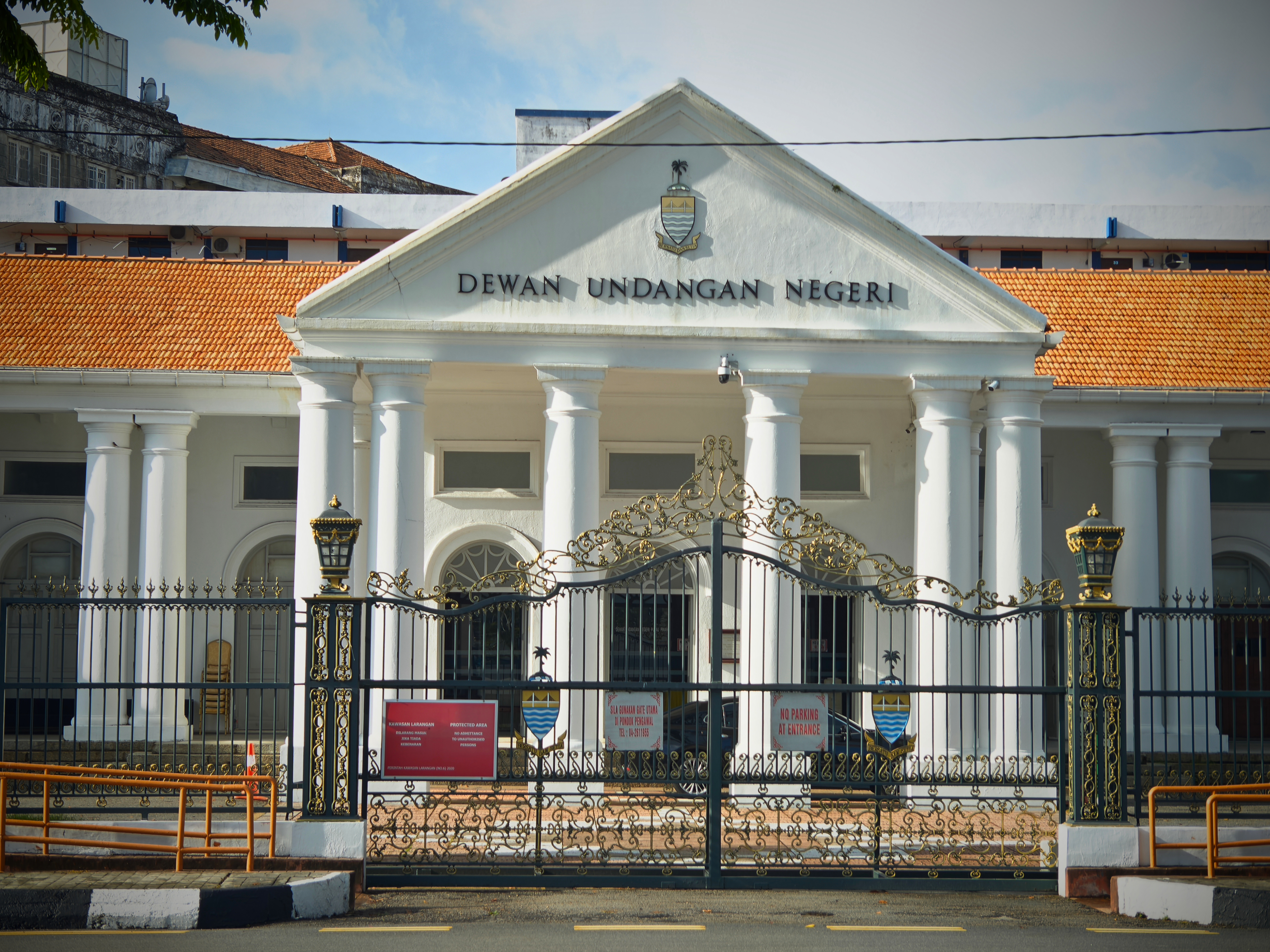
- Interactive map of the Penang State Assembly Building area
- Former names: Magistrate's Courts, Central Police Station

General information
- Status: Completed
- Type: State Legislative Assembly
- Architectural style: Anglo-Indian
- Location: Light Street, 10200 George Town, Penang, Malaysia, George Town, Penang, Malaysia
- Coordinates: 5.419423°N 100.343265°E
- Current tenants: Government of Penang
- Construction started: 1820s
- Renovated: 1959
- Renovation cost: $150,000
- Owner: Government of Penang

UNESCO World Heritage Site
- Type: Cultural
- Criteria: ii, iii, iv
- Designated: 2008 (32nd session)
- Part of: George Town UNESCO Core Zone
- Reference no.: 1223
- Region: Asia-Pacific

The Penang State Assembly Building is the home of the Penang State Legislative Assembly. It is located at Light Street in the city of George Town in Penang, Malaysia, within the city's UNESCO World Heritage Site. All State Legislative Assembly proceedings are held within the building.

Built in the 1820s, the Anglo-Indian classical style building originally served as part of George Town's Central Police Station. It was only in 1959 when the building was converted into the current home of the State Legislative Assembly.

== Architecture ==
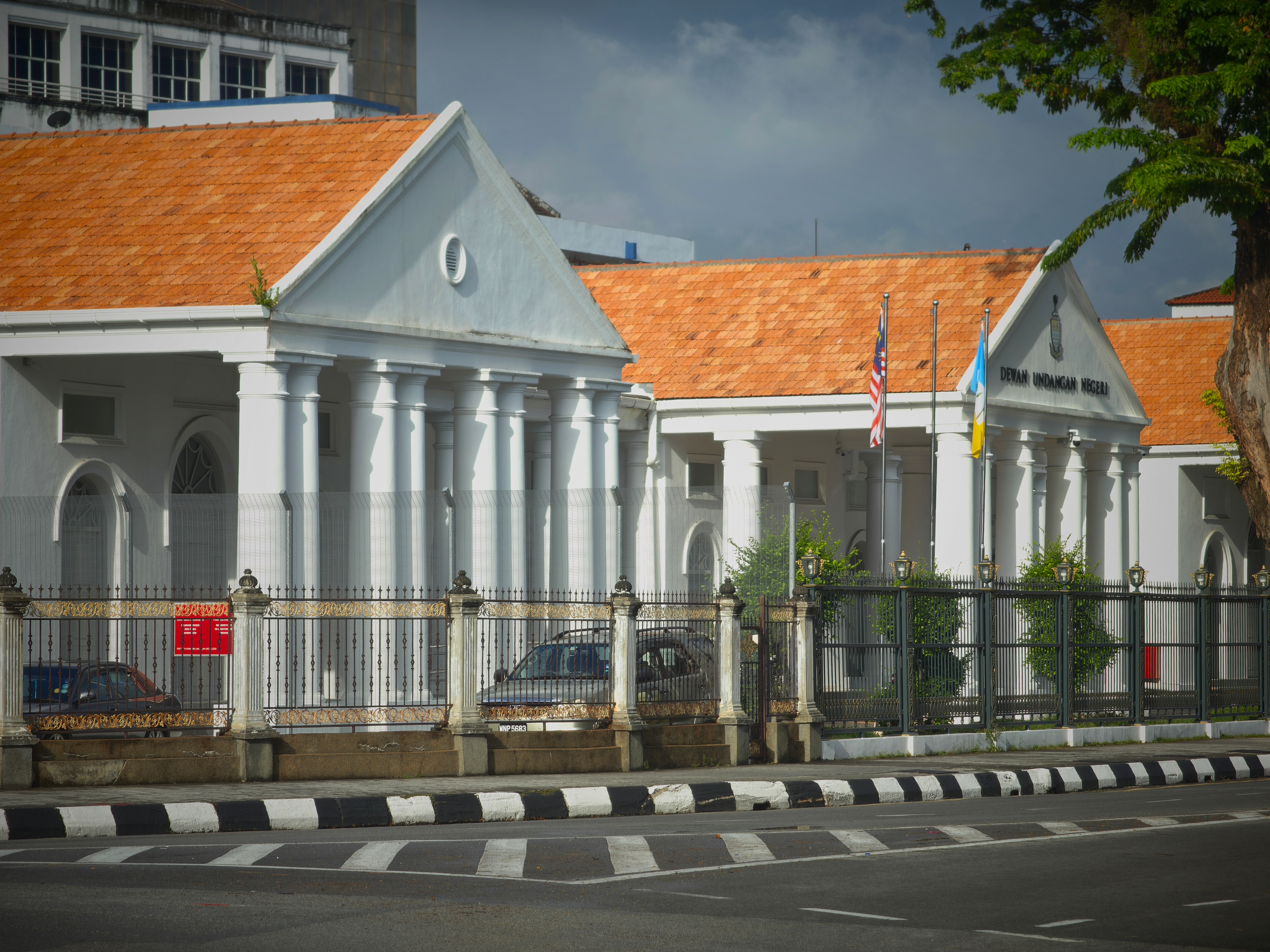
Side view of the building

The Penang State Assembly Building was designed in the Anglo-Indian classical style, and contains elements of classical Greek and Palladian architectures. For instance, the massive white colonnades supporting a large pediment were inspired by ancient Greek temples.

== History ==
The building now known as the Penang State Assembly Building was built sometime in the 1820s, although its exact date of construction has not been determined. As with many other buildings of that particular period, this building was constructed by convict labourers sent from India.

Originally, the building was part of George Town's Central Police Station, housing the Recorder's and Magistrate's Courts. It was renovated in 1874, while another administrative building was added to the police complex in 1890.

The building retained its judicial function until 1959, when it was finally converted for use by the newly-formed Penang State Legislative Assembly. The conversion of the building into the present-day State Assembly Building cost $150,000 (Malaya and British Borneo dollar).

== See also ==
- Penang State Legislative Assembly
