= Francis Light =

British sailor and explorer (c. 1740–1794)

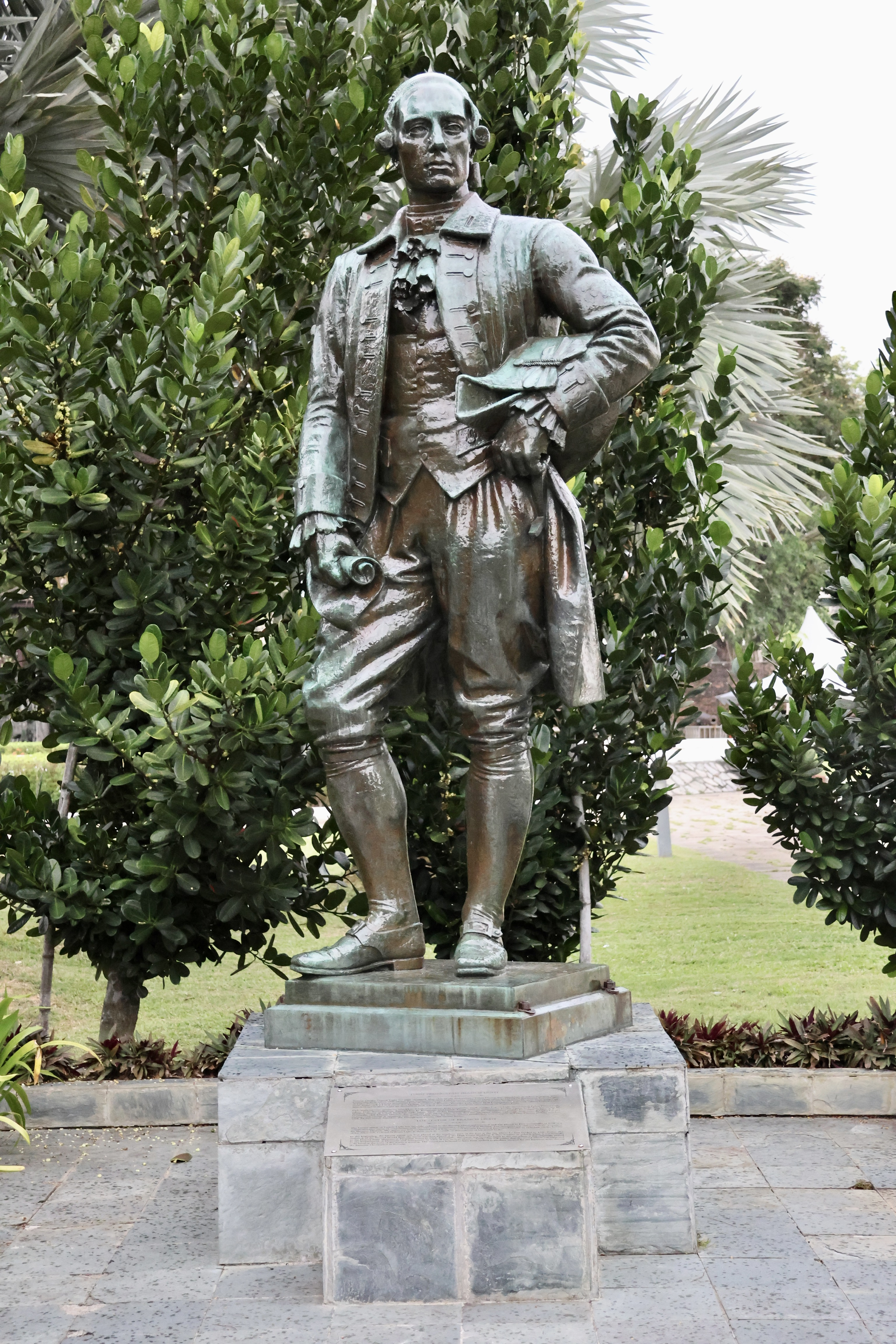
- Statue of Light at Fort Cornwallis
- Born: c. 1740; Dallinghoo, Suffolk
- Died: 21 October 1794 (aged 53–54); Penang, Malaya Peninsula
- Occupations: Sailor, explorer
- Known for: Founding Penang and George Town
- Children: William Light

Francis Light (c. 1740 – 21 October 1794) was a British sailor and explorer best known for founding the colony of Penang and its capital city of George Town in 1786. Light was the father of William Light, who founded the city of Adelaide in South Australia in 1836.

== Early years ==
Francis Light was born in Dallinghoo, Suffolk and baptised on 15 December 1740. His mother was Mary Light. Taken in by a relative, William Negus, Light was sent to attend the Woodbridge Grammar School in 1747.. Several historians have described Light as Negus' illegitimate son, but according to author Noël Francis Light Purdon – the six-times great-grandson of Light – Negus instead received payment from Light's parents for looking after him and acted as his guardian throughout his education. (Note: Purdon was/is reportedly authoring a book on the Light Family. See also here and notes about a talk he gave.)

== Career ==
=== Naval career ===
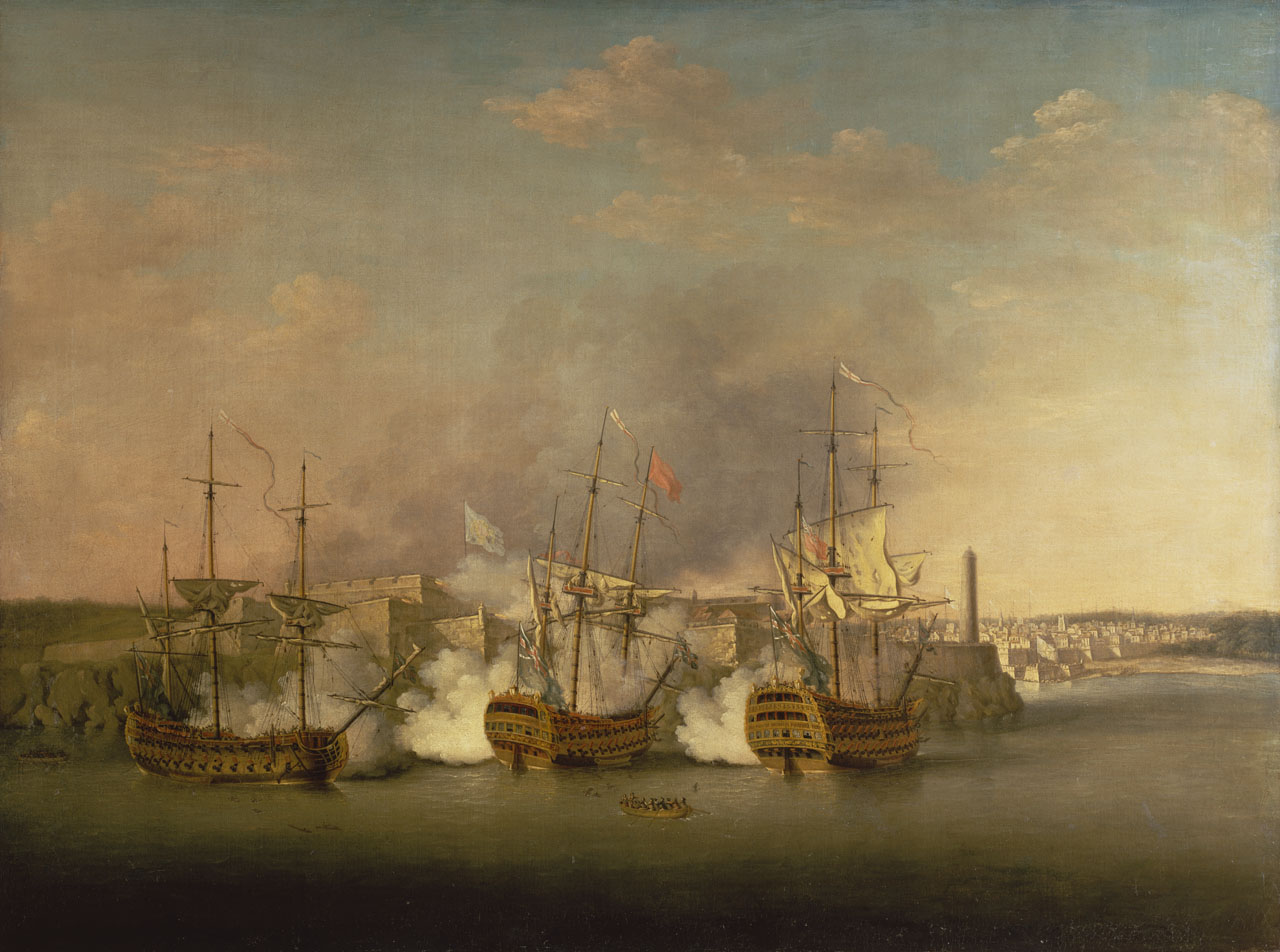
HMS Dragon (centre) in 1762

In February 1754, Light joined the Royal Navy, serving as a surgeon's mate onboard the 64-gun HMS Mars. He began serving onboard the 70-gun HMS Captain in 1759 before being transferred after a few months to the newly-commissioned 74-gun HMS Dragon. Light was promoted to midshipman on the 74-gun HMS Arrogant in 1761 before being discharged from the British navy without being commissioned as an officer in 1763. During his career in the Royal Navy, he met James Scott, who would later play an important part in Light's life and business career.

=== In the colonies ===
His movements between 1763 and 1765 are not recorded, but it seems that he managed to amass enough of a fortune to bequeath a considerable amount of property in a will to William Negus and three other men.

==== Thalang, Siam ====
In 1765 Light embarked on the East India Company (EIC) merchant ship Clive, captained by John Allen, bound for Madras and Bombay. In British India, he secured command of a "country ship" belonging to the Madras trading firm Jourdain, Sulivan & Desouza, the Speedwell. Setting up a base in Thalang in Siam (also known as Salang and Jung/JunkCeylon, now Phuket province, in Thailand), he traded there, in Aceh (now an Indonesian province) and the Malay Peninsula, learning the local languages. Basing himself in Thalang, he met a woman named Martina Rozells, and together they set up a trading post in Kuala Kedah. He soon gained an influential position with the Sultan of Kedah.

For about ten years he had his headquarters in Thalang, where he revived a defunct French trading post. While in Thalang he learned to speak and write several languages, including Malay and Thai, and became family friends with Than Phu Ying Chan and her husband, the Governor of Thalang. Later, in 1785, he warned the island administrators of an imminent Burmese attack. Light's warning enabled the islanders, led by Chan and her sister Mook, to prepare for Thalang's defence and subsequently repel the Burmese invasion. In 1785, after the death of the Governor of Thalang, his widow and other relatives proposed that Light assume the position; however the King of Siam, Rama II, thwarted the proposal.

==== Penang ====
Light's interest in Penang had begun in 1771, when he proposed the idea of a British settlement in the neighbourhood of the Malay Peninsula to Warren Hastings, the East India Company's Governor of the Presidency of Fort William (Bengal). He suggested that the island of Penang might serve as a "convenient magazine for the Eastern trade" but at that time his idea didn't gain traction. In 1776–77, Light arranged a large shipment of firearms for the Siamese Kingdom of Thonburi, ruled by Taksin the Great.

Whereas his previous suggestion had brought no result, following the American Revolutionary War during which Britain had struggled with France for naval superiority, Light's suggestion took on a new significance. In 1786, on behalf of the EIC, Light leased Penang Island from Sultan Abdullah Mukarram Shah, for the price of 6,000 Spanish dollars per annum. Under the administration of Governor-general Sir John Macpherson, Light was entitled superintendent and put in charge of the settlement, styled Dewa Raja by the Malays, on 1 July 1786; thus marking the beginning of British Malaya. The new colony was sparsely populated at this time: it was described as "one vast jungle of nearly 107 square miles, with a population of only fifty-eight souls". Pirates had to be discouraged from landing, and forests were cleared. George Town (named after King George III) was established, and when two East India Company ships appeared on the coast, Light took the opportunity of inviting the ships and crews to attend the declaration of the new colony of Prince of Wales Island on 11 August 1786, being the eve of the Prince of Wales's birthday.

The Sultan, however, was bound under the Southeast Asian mandala political model in fealty to the King of Siam. Light had exceeded his authority with a promise of military aid should the Burmese or Siamese invade, despite the fact that Sultan Abdullah asked him to refrain from landing until the promise of military aid had been confirmed in London. Thus, when the Sultan's territories were invaded and no aid was forthcoming, the Sultan attempted to take back the island as a refuge in 1790. (Note: Shah's reigns incorrectly recorded as 1773 in this source – should be 1778.)

The multicultural colony of Penang became extraordinarily successful from its inception and Light served as superintendent of the settlement until his death in October 1794, apart from 21 November 1789 to 9 February 1790, when John Glass acted in his place. By 1789 there were about 10,000 inhabitants, and by 1795, 20,000.

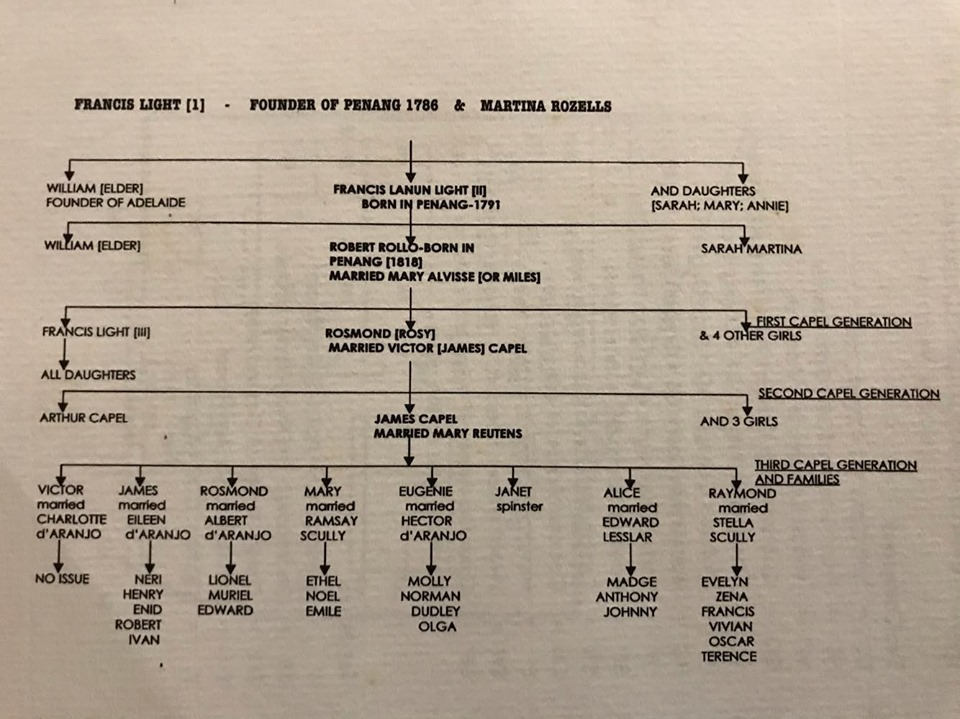
Family tree of the Capel family descendants of Light

Accounts of his actions seem to indicate that he was a fair-minded and honourable man. In 1790, he asked for a higher salary, in order to allow him to live without having to engage in trade (by which he may have enriched himself, but possibly compromise his role). This led to his business partnership with James Scott being dissolved. In 1794, he recommended that a proper system of justice should be instituted in Penang, as it should not be within the powers of the superintendent to dispense "arbitrary judgement".

== Death and legacy ==
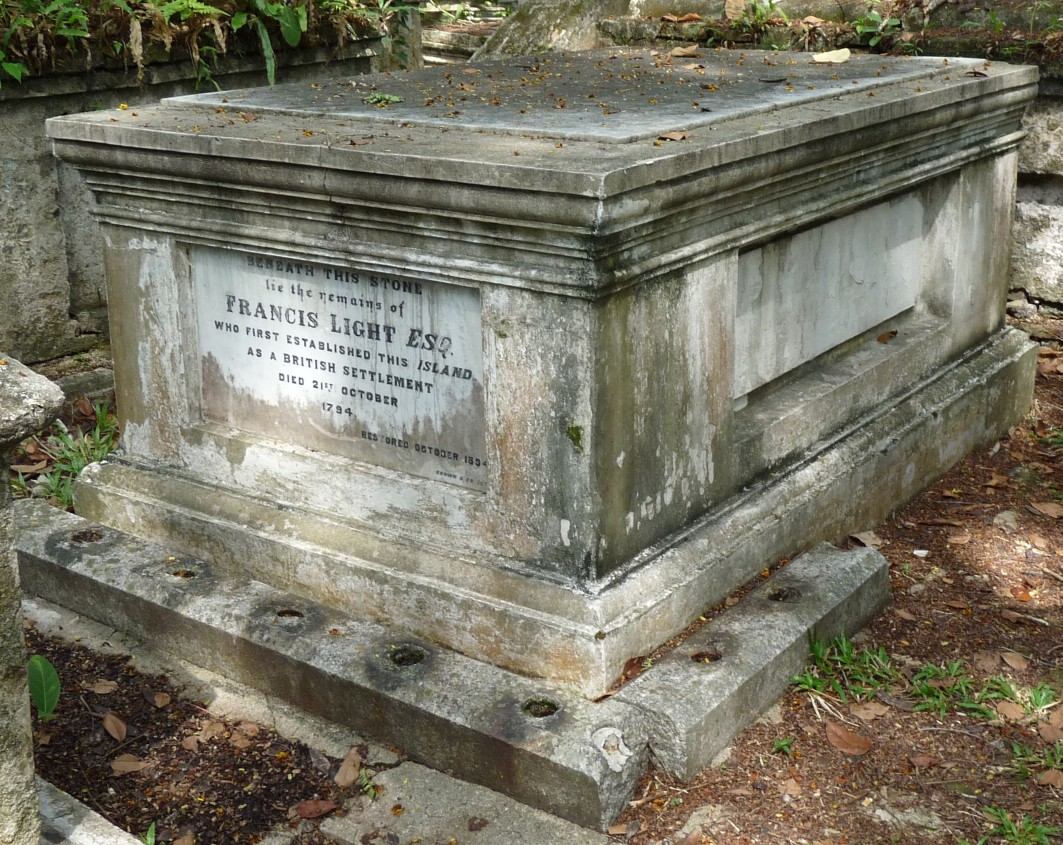
The tomb of Francis Light in Penang's Protestant Cemetery.

Light died from malaria on 21 October 1794 (Note: One source mentions 25 October.) and was buried at the Old Protestant Cemetery at Northam Road (now Jalan Sultan Ahmad Shah Road) in George Town, Penang. He remembered his friends James Scott, William Fairlie and Thomas Pegou in his will.

A bronze statue, sculpted by F.J. Wilcoxson and cast at Burton's Foundry in Thames Ditton, bears Francis Light's name but was actually modelled on the features of his son William, as there were no portrait of Francis to use. Erected in 1936 to celebrate 150 years since George Town was founded, it stands at Fort Cornwallis in George Town. Light Street, within the UNESCO World Heritage Site in George Town, is named after him. Convent Light Street, Penang's oldest girls' school, founded in 1852, is located along the street. He was respected by his British peers as a fair and honourable man and admired for his achievements, which included keeping the Siamese and Dutch at bay. He was a skilled negotiator and cared for the welfare of the people both in his colony and old friends in Thalang, sending rice when the island was hit by famine. He spoke the local languages and partially assumed the local dress, earning the love of the residents of Penang.

== Family ==
=== Martina Rozells ===
Light had three daughters and two sons with Martina (sometimes spelt Martinha) Rozells (possibly born Thong Di), whose origins and status are the subject of debate. She has been variously recorded as being of Portuguese or French extraction on one side, and of Siamese or Malay on the other. She was also rumoured to have been a princess, possibly given to Light as a reward, or the island as her dowry, although other sources state that the princess was sent to enlist Light's aid on behalf of the Sultan.

Two contemporaries of Light, historian William Marsden (who says that she was the daughter of the Sultan of Kedah), and Captain Elisha Trapaud (who describes the wedding of Light to a princess of the Sultan's family, bestowed upon him as a mark of the prince's gratitude) seem to confirm the story that she was of noble blood. However, John Crawfurd, later First Resident of Singapore, said in 1820 that Martina was not a princess, but a Portuguese woman from Siam, and Steuart points out that there is no evidence that Trapaud knew Light when the couple began living together. Other contemporary accounts name her as the daughter of the 19th Sultan of Kedah (Muhammad Jiwa Zainal Adilin II), by a lower-ranking wife of mixed Thai-Portuguese ancestry. She may have adopted her mother's name to emphasise her ancestry and "high birth". She was probably one of many Portuguese Eurasian Catholics who had fled religious persecution in southern Siam and to Kedah.

There were a number of Rozells registered at George Town in 1788. There was also a Martinha (no surname shown) registered as being from Siam, with a son William, of Kedah. Steuart posits that Martina was the same person as the "Nonya" who took part in the earliest negotiations with the Sultan in 1770–1771. This would support the idea that she was not a princess, but nevertheless had strong connections with both Siam and Kedah and therefore a useful person to employ in negotiations between the Sultan and the British administration at Aceh. If they were legally married, Light did not declare it. However, it was against East India Company rules to marry a Catholic and, as Martina belonged to the Catholic faith, Light may have tried to avoid dismissal by refraining from officially declaring his marriage. Light left Rozells his considerable property in his will. Either way, they cohabited for at least 22 years before his death.

Light's business partners, James Scott and William Fairlie, were the executors of Light's will, and some versions of events have suggested that they cheated Rozells out of portions of her inheritance, namely their family residence and estate, the Suffolk Estate. Rozells did however inherit a bungalow in Penang, along with a pension from the East India Company. Despite the lack of recognition from Light's British peers in regards to the status of Rozells as his wife, she was perceived as such by the local Eurasians and Thai community. Rozells later remarried, marrying a John Timmer at a ceremony at the chapel in Fort Cornwallis in 1799.

=== Family life and offspring ===
Light and his family lived in the first home constructed on the Suffolk Estate, now known as Suffolk House, 6.4 kilometres (4 mi) west of George Town. Their home was described as a "simple Anglo-Indian Garden House style of timber and attap construction", built within his pepper estate. (After Light's estate was settled in 1805, William Edward Phillips built a grand Georgian-styled mansion, also known as Suffolk Park.) His eldest son, Colonel William Light, was the first Surveyor General of the Colony of South Australia; William is famous for choosing the site of the colony's capital, Adelaide, and designing the layout of the streets and parks in the Adelaide city centre, North Adelaide and the Adelaide Park Lands.

The other son, Francis Lanoon Light II, was born in Penang in 1791, married a Javanese woman, Charlotte Aboni, with whom he had a daughter and two sons. He died in 1823. His descendants are the Capel family in Malaysia. Their daughters were named Sarah, Mary and Ann (aka "Lukey"). They all married in Calcutta. Sarah married General James Welsh, an EIC officer in the Madras Army. Mary married a wealthy indigo plantation owner, George Boyd, and Ann married a physician, Charles Hunter. By 1818, Welsh observed that his wife and her siblings had seen all of their mother's property disappear.

== See also ==
- Governor of Penang
- History of Penang
- Koh Lay Huan
- Suffolk House, Penang
- William Light, son
