= Convent Light Street =

Defunct school building in George Town, Malaysia

Coordinates: 5°25′19″N 100°20′08″E

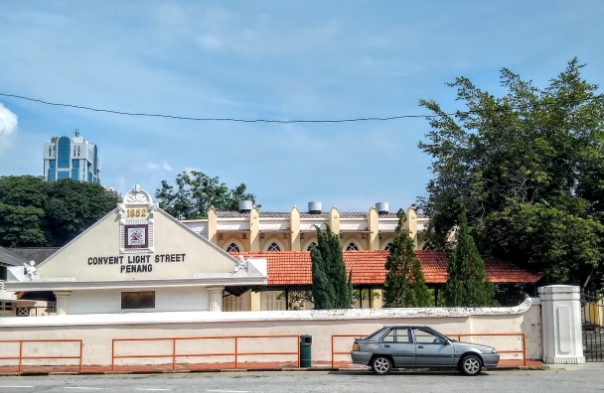

Location
- Light Street; George Town, Penang; Malaysia

Information
- Type: Girls National Secondary School
- Motto: Simple dans ma vertu, forte dans mon devoir (Simple in My Virtues, Steadfast in My Duties)
- Religious affiliation: Christian
- Denomination: Roman Catholic
- Established: 1852
- Founders: Sisters of the Infant Jesus also known as the Dames of Saint Maur
- Closed: 2023
- School district: Northeast Penang Island
- Gender: Girls
- Alumni name: Colistrians

Convent Light Street was a missionary girls' school in George Town, Penang, Malaysia. Founded in 1852 by French Catholic nuns of the Sisters of the Infant Jesus, it was the oldest girls' school in Malaysia and the oldest missionary convent in Southeast Asia. The school was closed in 2023.

== History ==
In 1851, Jean-Baptiste Boucho, Vicar Apostolic of Malacca-Singapore, appealed to the institute of the Sisters of the Infant Jesus, also known as the Dames of Saint Maur, for assistance in establishing a mission school for girls in Malaya, and in December 1851, four sisters from the Mission of the Infant Jesus sailed from Antwerp bound for Penang. In July 1852, three sisters arrived, one sister having died during the voyage, and they settled in a small wooden building in Church Street, George Town near the Church of the Assumption, which served as the first school. Teaching during the day, the sisters sewed at night to raise additional funds as the number of pupils increased.

In 1859, the mission, led by Mother St Mathilde Raclot, acquired the current site at the end of Light Street for Fr50,000 which included Government House. Built at the beginning of the nineteenth century and previously abandoned, the building once served as the government offices and council chambers. Initially, wooden huts were erected to serve as classrooms, dormitories and kitchens and Government House was converted into a novitiate. From time to time, additional buildings were erected on the site. In 1867, a chapel was built, and in 1882, an assembly hall, cloisters and more classrooms. During the 1930s more buildings were added, including a new chapel with an art deco interior. During the Japanese occupation, the school was used by the Japanese Imperial Navy and 22 captured US sailors from the USS Grenadier SS210 were incarcerated in the school in 1943, and scratched their names into the walls which have been preserved behind glass.

In the early years, Light Street Convent operated as an orphanage school, taking in both boys and girls regardless of background, creed or ethnicity, and on reaching the age of eleven, boys were transferred to the nearby St Xavier's Institution. However, it soon became a girls' only school with girls from all backgrounds, from orphans to daughters of Malay sultans and aristocrats, princesses of Thai royalty, and daughters of wealthy Chinese families, enrolling. In the 1900s, there were about 500 pupils, mostly Chinese, including 150 orphans, 120 paying borders and 230 day pupils, and by the 1930s the number had risen to over 1,000. In 1961, the school stopped taking orphans.

In 2020, the Sisters of the Infant Jesus announced they would be closing the school, "due to a continuous decline in enrolment of students in the last decade and escalating costs to maintain the heritage school buildings", but planned to open a new private international school at the site. In 2023, a ceremony was held to mark the closure of the school.
