= Nattukkottai Chettiar Temple, Penang =

Nattukkottai Chettiar Temple
- Malay: Kuil Nattukkottai Chettiar; Tamil: நாட்டுக்கோட்டை செட்டியார் ஆலயம்
- Location within George Town

Religion
- Affiliation: Hinduism
- Deity: Murugan
- Status: Active

Location
- Location: Jalan Kebun Bunga, George Town
- State: Penang
- Country: Malaysia
- Interactive map of Nattukkottai Chettiar Temple
- Coordinates: 5°25′58.0218″N 100°17′54.891″E

Architecture
- Creator: Unknown

Website
- https://pttemple.com

The Nattukkottai Chettiar Thendayuthapani Temple (Tamil:நாட்டுக்கோட்டை செட்டியார் ஆலயம்), also known as the Arulmigu Thandayuthapani Temple, is a Hindu temple within George Town in the Malaysian state of Penang. It was built around 1854, after the Nattukottai Chettiar community at Penang Street bought the piece of land to build a residential quarters. Dedicated to Lord Murugan, the temple is adorned with hundreds of religious-themed paintings from India along the recesses of its roof.
