= Statue of Francis Light =

Memorial to Captain Francis Light in Malaysia

Coordinates: 5°25′13″N 100°20′32″E

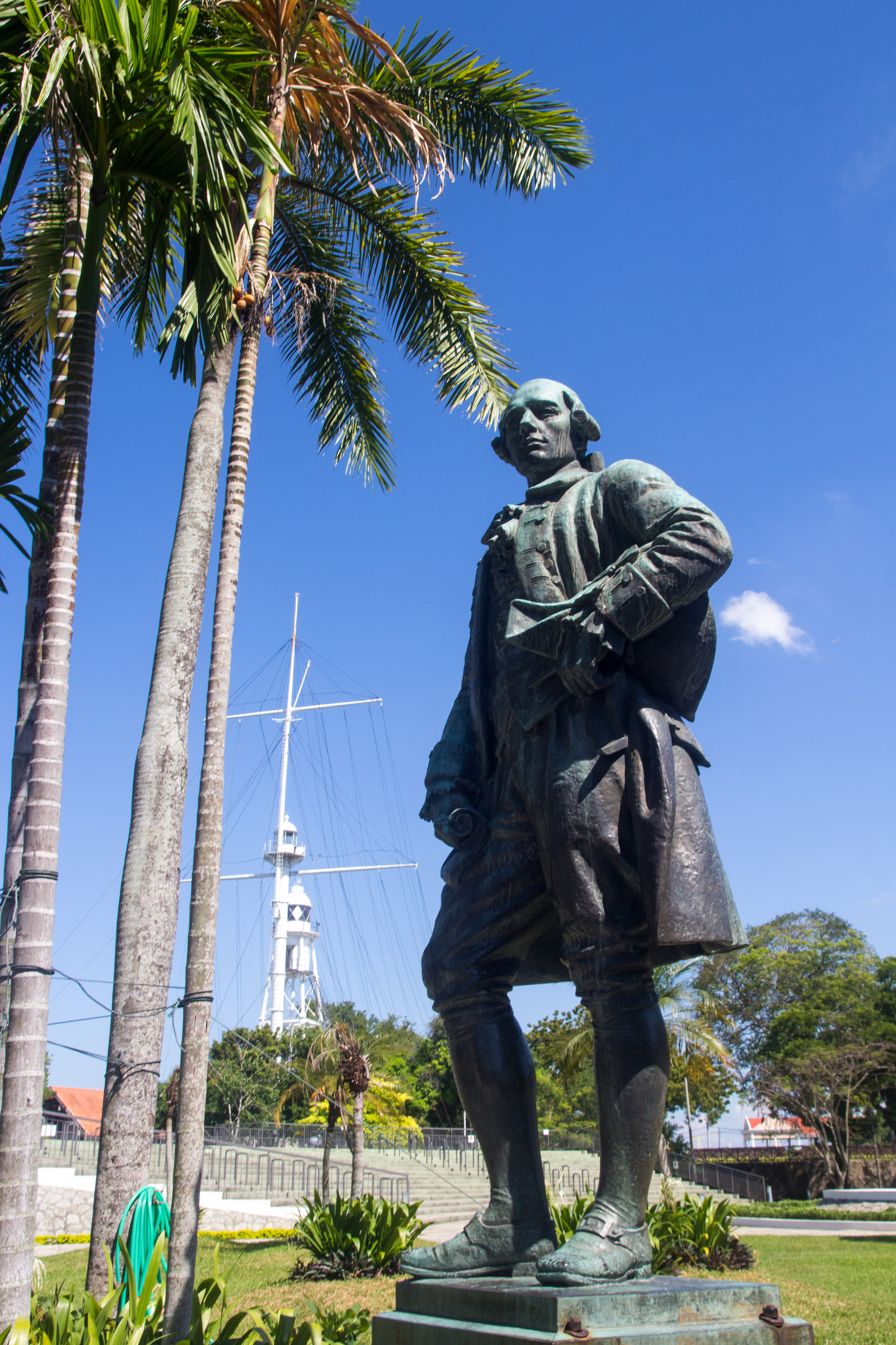
- Artist: Frederick John Wilcoxson
- Completion date: 1939
- Medium: Bronze statue
- Subject: Francis Light
- Location: George Town, Penang

The Francis Light statue is a memorial to Captain Francis Light (1740–1794), the founder of the British colony of Penang in 1786. It is situated in the grounds of Fort Cornwallis, George Town, Penang, Malaysia.

== History ==
The proposal to erect a memorial to Francis Light was first discussed during the celebrations marking the 150th anniversary of the founding of Penang in 1936 by the organising committee. Later, an amount from the Municipal Fund was approved supported by private donors.

Two models, including pedestal and plaque, were subsequently prepared by English sculptor, Frederick John Wilcoxson A.R.B.S. who had previously provided statues of Loke Yew, Kuala Lumpur, and Rajah Brooke, Kuching, and submitted them to the Municipal Commissioners for approval. The design was chosen and a cost of $15,000 agreed.

The completed statue arrived in Penang from England on 13 May 1939 on board S.S. Glenfinlas to be erected in Light Street, opposite the District and Police Court building, and a stone's throw from the site of Francis Light's landing in 1786. It was unveiled on 3 October 1939 by Sir Shenton Thomas, Governor of the Straits Settlements, at a lavish ceremony, attended by several thousand people.

Since its unveiling, the statue has been moved to several different locations nearby, including in front of the Penang Court building and the Penang Museum, and is currently situated in the grounds of Fort Cornwallis. In 2020 the statue was vandalised when it was splashed with red paint.

== Description ==
When the sculpture was commissioned, the sculptor, F. J. Wilcoxson, was faced with the difficulty that no image of Francis Light was known to exist, so he used the portrait of his eldest son, Colonel William Light, which was hanging in the National Portrait Gallery, London.

The bronze statue, cast at Burton's Foundry, Thames Ditton, originally stood on a 12 foot high pedestal made of local granite, but was replaced by smaller pedestals when subsequently relocated. The brass plaque bears the inscription: "Francis Light Founder Of Penang 1786" and was surmounted by another plaque of the crest of Penang Island consisting of three ostrich feathers.
