= Marie Lumague =

French religious leader and philanthropist

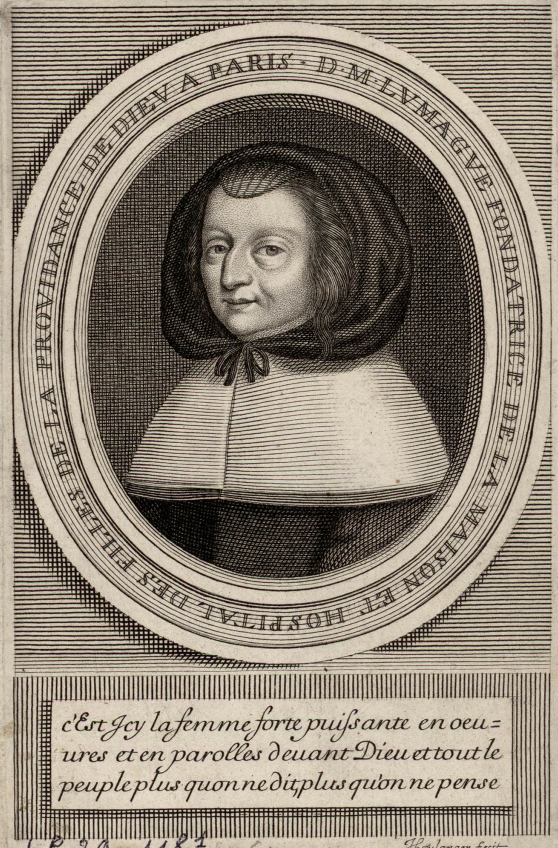
- Born: November 29, 1599; Paris, France
- Died: September 4, 1657 (aged 57); Paris, France
- Occupation: Philanthropist
- Known for: Daughters of Providence (Paris)

Marie Lumague (November 29, 1599 — September 4, 1657) was a French philanthropist and founder of the Daughters of Providence.

== Early life ==
Lumague was born in Paris on November 29, 1599, to a wealthy family. After her education, she joined a Capuchin monastery, a reflection of her piety and religious beliefs. In 1617, following health issues, she left the monastery and married Francois de Polallion. Her husband died only a year later, making her a widow.

== Religious following ==
In 1630, following Louise de Marillac, Lumague founded the Daughters of Providence, a Catholic religious congregation for the women of 17th-century Paris. The first house was called La Pitié, and it could host up to 40 women. Lumague hoped to provide an alternative to underprivileged women that was not prostitution nor the Madelonettes Convent.

The members of the Daughters of Providence concerned themselves with the education of the poor, modesty, and morality. In 1643, Lumague obtained Louis XIII's approval and opened a home for the protection and housing of these girls. In 1651, Anne of Austria took up the funding of the program.

On 17 October 1652, Saint Vincent de Paul and Lumague founded the Congregation of the Union-Chrétienne de Saint Chaumond for the education of young girls. Lumague often advised de Paul on spiritual matters and encouraged his charity. The members the congregation were the Ladies of Charity.

Lumague died in Paris on September 4, 1657. The Daughters of Providence were then taken over by the Ladies of Charity.
