= Light Street, George Town =

Road in the Malaysian state of Penang

Light Street
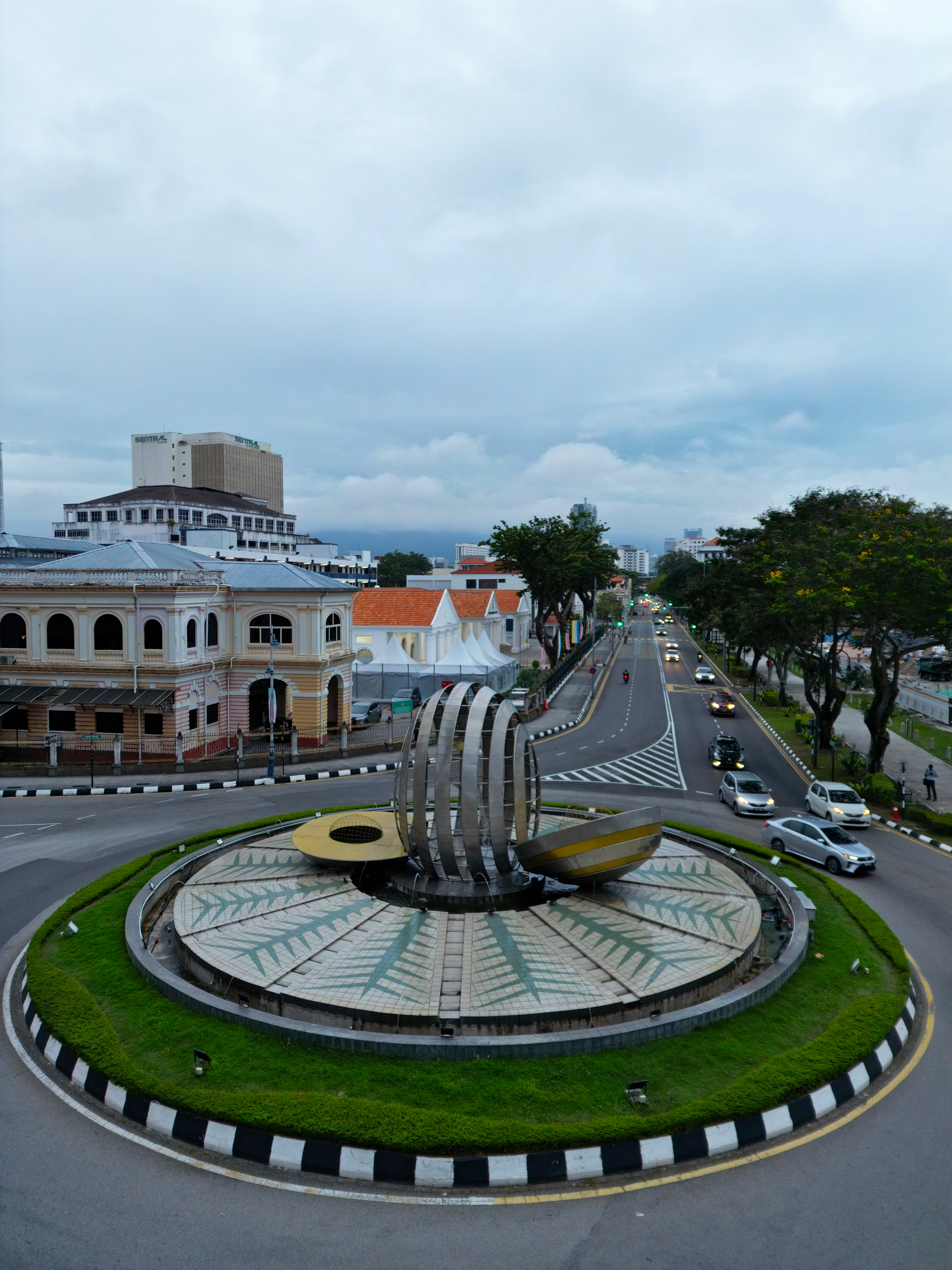
- Native name: Malay: Lebuh Light; Chinese: 莱特街; Chinese: 玻璃口; Hokkien POJ: Po-lê-kháu; Tamil: லைட் வீதி
- Maintained by: Penang Island City Council
- Location: George Town
- Coordinates: 5.4204°N 100.341214°E
- West end: Farquhar Street
- East end: Beach Street

Construction
- Inauguration: 1786
- LEBUH LIGHT Light St10200 P. PINANG

UNESCO World Heritage Site
- Type: Cultural
- Criteria: ii, iii, iv
- Designated: 2008 (32nd session)
- Part of: George Town UNESCO Core Zone
- Reference no.: 1223
- Region: Asia-Pacific

Light Street is the oldest road in the city of George Town within the Malaysian state of Penang. It was named after the founder of Penang, Captain Francis Light. As the epicentre of George Town, the street was created soon after Light established the settlement in 1786 and has been serving as a major thoroughfare within the city centre ever since.

Located within the city's UNESCO World Heritage Site, Light Street has also been part of the city's civic core, as the main administrative and judicial buildings of Penang were built within the vicinity of the road, including Fort Cornwallis, the City Hall, the State Assembly Building and the Supreme Court.

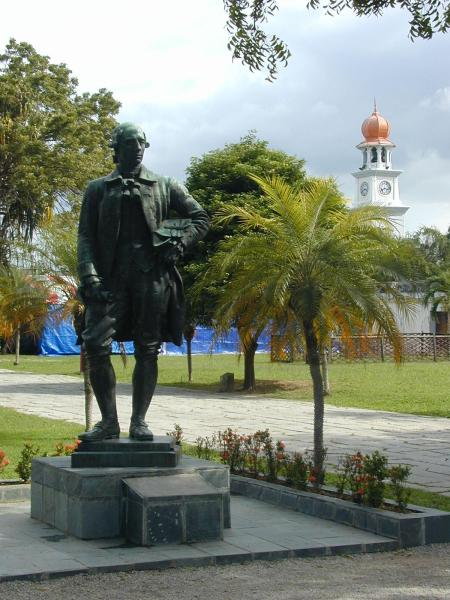
A bronze statue of Captain Francis Light now stands within Fort Cornwallis, which is located within the vicinity of Light Street.

== Etymology ==
Light Street was named after Captain Francis Light, who founded Penang Island and established the settlement of George Town in 1786.

== History ==
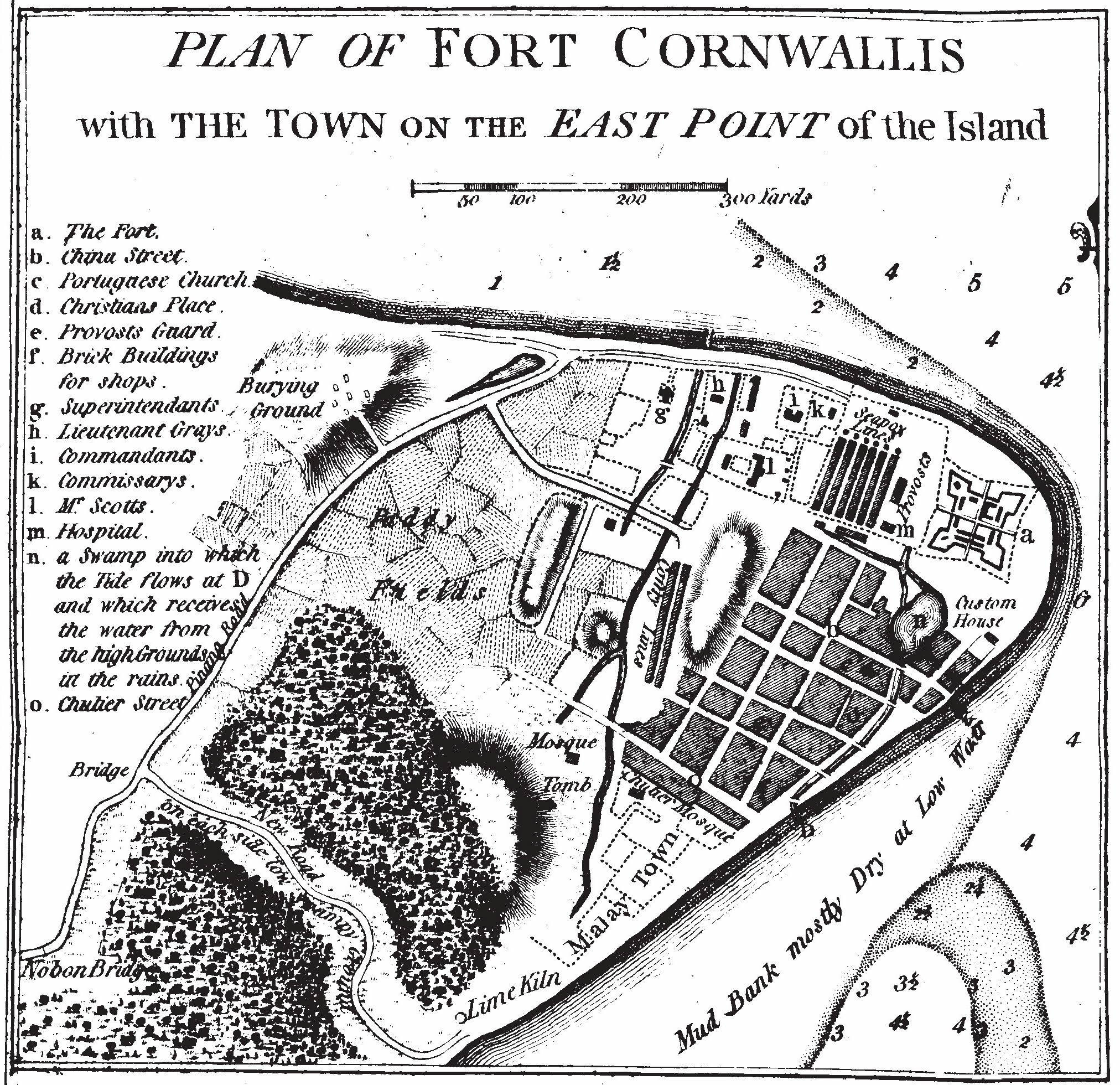
Light Street ran along the south of Fort Cornwallis in this 1799 map of George Town.

Light Street was created between 1786 and 1787, soon after the founding of George Town. Having landed at the then swampy Esplanade, and while Fort Cornwallis was under construction, Light ordered the crew of his ship to fire silver coins into the jungles that covered the area at the time. With the Esplanade cleared, he then created Light Street, which was named after himself.

With over 200 years of history stretching back to 1786, Light Street is older than most cities and towns in Peninsular Malaysia and Singapore. In addition, Light Street became the epicentre of George Town, as it was the nucleus from which the other streets within the new settlement radiated out.

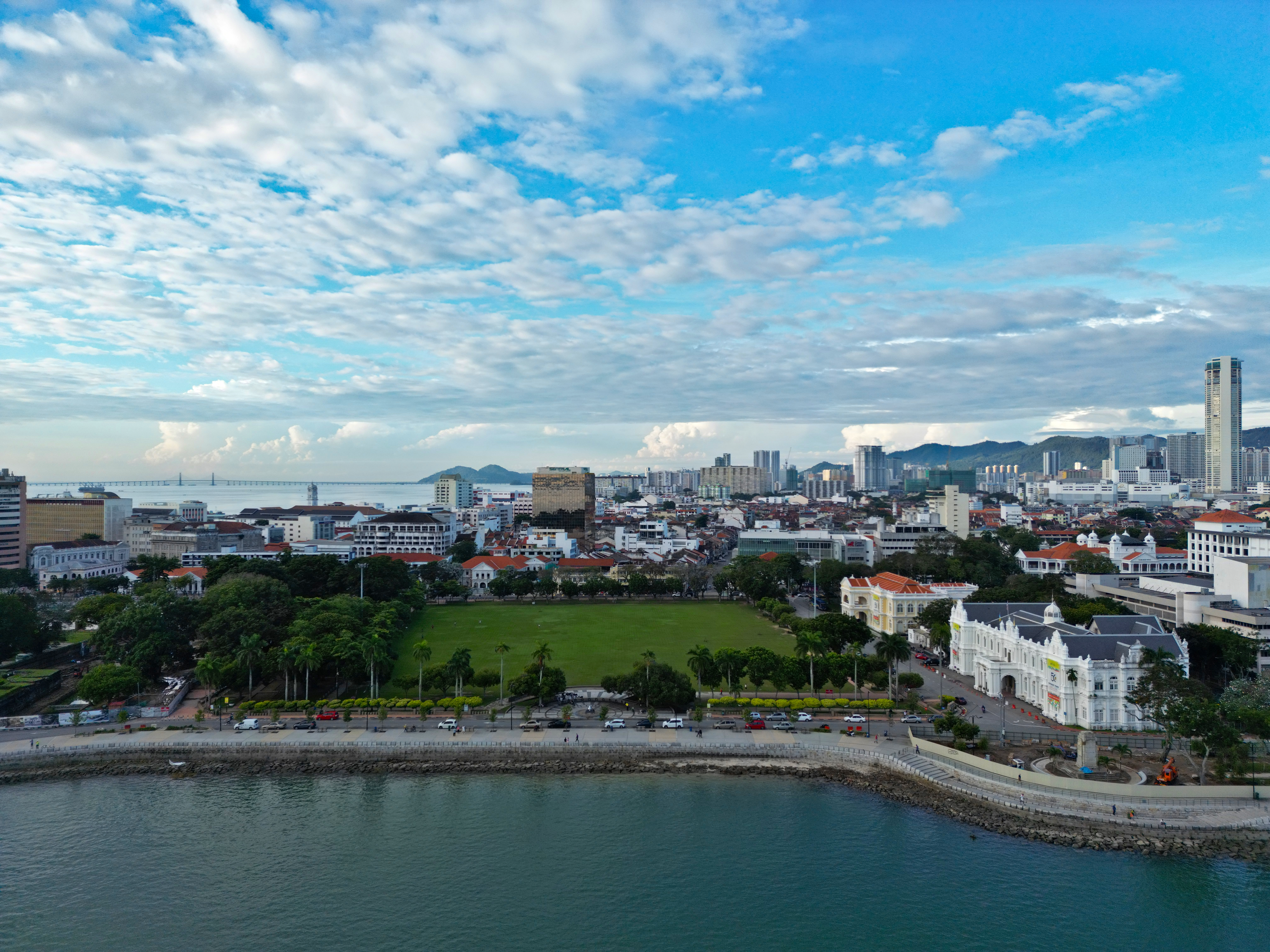
The Esplanade at Light Street

One of Francis Light's first municipal acts was the sinking of a public well, now located within Convent Light Street. Light and his business partner, James Scott, also had their residences built at Light Street, the first of several residences built by British officials along the road.

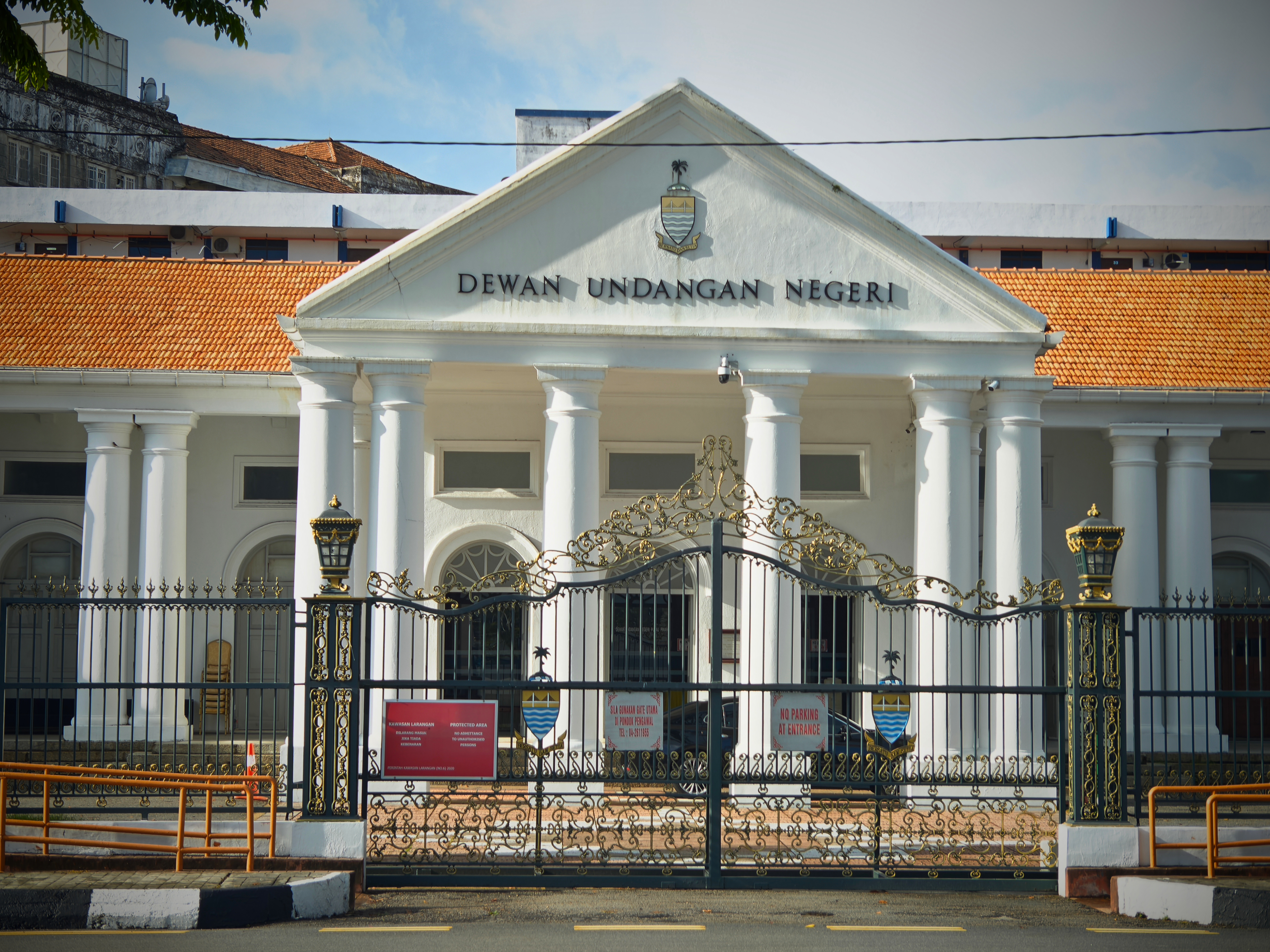
Penang State Assembly Building

Gradually, administrative and judicial buildings were also built along Light Street by the British, turning it into the administrative heart of Penang. The Supreme Court of Penang, established within Fort Cornwallis in 1809, was then relocated to the present High Court Building along Light Street the following year. The State Assembly Building, originally built as the central police station of George Town, was completed by the mid 19th century. The City Hall, which faces the Esplanade, was constructed at the start of the 20th century.

A Straits Settlements administrative complex located at the junction with Beach Street was also constructed in the late 19th century. Upon completion, it housed, among others, the Governor's office, the Land Office, the Marine Department and the Public Works Department. However, the building was almost entirely destroyed during World War II. Only a small part of the complex remains standing; it now houses the offices of the Penang State Islamic Council.

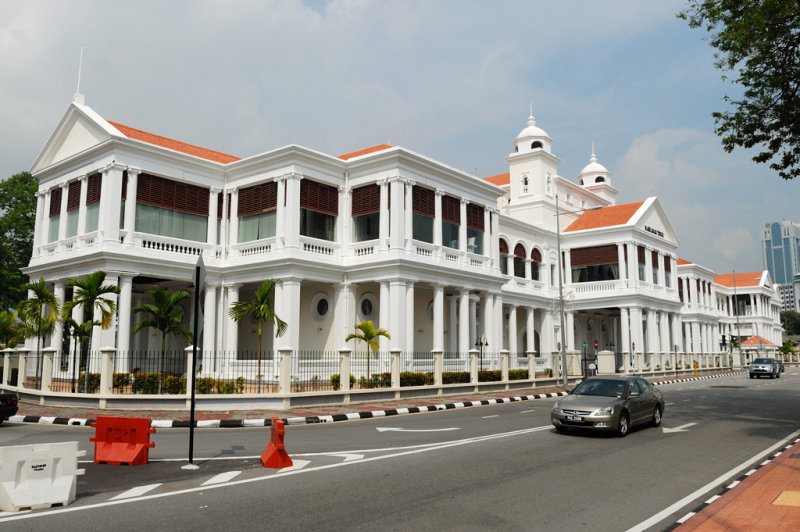
The Palladian-style Penang High Court

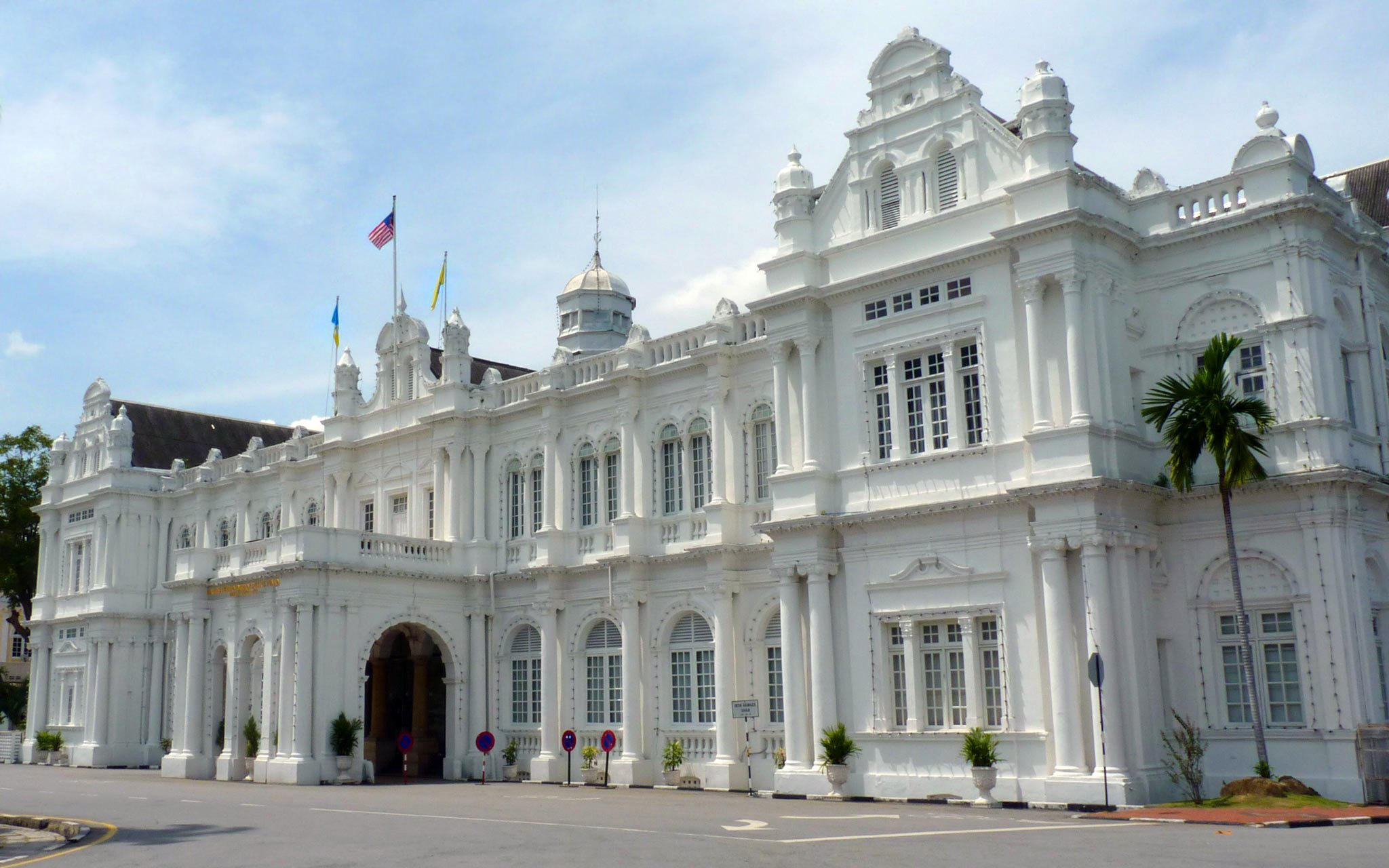
The City Hall was completed in 1903.

== Landmarks ==
- Queen Victoria Memorial Clock Tower, built to commemorate the Diamond Jubilee of Queen Victoria in 1897
- Esplanade
- Fort Cornwallis, the oldest fort in Malaysia
- Town Hall, the oldest municipal seat in Penang, was completed in the 1880s
- Penang Chinese Chamber of Commerce
- Foo Tye Sin Mansion

== Government buildings ==
- Penang State Assembly Building, the home of the Penang State Legislative Assembly.
- City Hall, the seat of the Penang Island City Council

== Judiciary ==
- High Court of Penang

== Education ==
- Convent Light Street

== See also ==
- List of roads in George Town
- Architecture of Penang
