= Montfort Secondary School =

Coordinates: 1°22′25.16″N 103°53′19.63″E

- 蒙福中学; Sekolah Menengah Montfort
- 50 Hougang Avenue 8, Singapore 538785

Information
- Former name: Holy Innocent’s English School (1916-1958)
- Type: Government-aided
- Motto: Age Quod Agis (Latin) (Do Well In Whatever You Do)
- Religious affiliation: Christianity (Catholic)
- Founded: 1916; 110 years ago
- Session: Single Session
- School code: 7011
- Chairman: Mark Tay Teck Chye
- Principal: Mrs Janice Lim
- Grades: Secondary 1 to Secondary 5.
- Age range: 13-17
- Language: English
- Houses: Berthomieu; Majella; Gonzaga; Proulx
- Colour: Red Green White Blue Yellow
- Song: "Song of the Brave"
- Nickname: Montfortians
- Affiliations: Montfort Junior School; Catholic Junior College
- Vision: A Man For Others—A Scholar, A Sportsman, A Gentleman and A Leader.
- Website: monfortsec.moe.edu.sg

Montfort Secondary School (MSS) is a government-aided Roman Catholic all-boys' secondary school located in Hougang, Singapore. Founded in 1916, it is one of the seven institutions governed by St Gabriel's Foundation.

== History ==
=== Holy Innocents' English School (1916–1958) ===
Montfort Secondary School was founded in 1916 as the Holy Innocents' English School, next to Nativity Church in Upper Serangoon Road, by the parish priest of Serangoon, Father Laurent Saleilles. At the request of the Inspector of Schools, Father Henri Duvelle, the successor of Father Laurent, organized an English class and a Chinese class on the floors of the two-storey building between the church and the school canteen. Mr Lee Ah Kow was engaged to run the classes which lasted for three years.

In March 1920, Father Edouard Becheras, the parish priest restarted the school with a class of 30 pupils under the charge of Mr. Monterio. In the following year, another class was added. From 1922-1936, Mr P.A. D'Costa was recruited to be the Principal of Holy Innocents English School and the school grew. A block of five classrooms along Upper Serangooon Road was completed in 1927. In 1929, three additional classrooms along Holy Innocents Lane were added.

In 1932, another floor was added to the second block. In 1936, Mgr Adrien Devals, the Bishop of Singapore and Malaya invited the brother of St Gabriel to run the Parish School. Brother Gerard Majella came from Bangkok to become the first Brother Director of the school. Brothers Adolphus and John de Breboeuf came in December 1936. This was also the year the school produced its first School Certificate class. Brother Gerard Majella was succeeded in 1938 by Brother Louis Gonzaga.

The Second World War Japanese occupation of Singapore interrupted the curriculum of the school. Immediately after the war, Brother Louis Gonzaga returned from Bahau, Johor to reopen the school. He extended the block along Upper Serangoon Road by adding another floor. The new extension was opened by the Sultan of Johore. In 1949, Brother Louis Gonzaga started an afternoon school—-Holy Innocents' Afternoon School—-under the charge of Brother Basil. In 1955 Brother Noel became the Director of the Holy Innocents'. He set up a committee on 3 April 1955 to raise funds to further extend the school. Within three years, the extension was completed.

=== Montfort School (1959–1992) ===
In 1959, Holy Innocents’ English School was renamed Montfort School in honour of St Louis Marie Grignion de Montfort, the founder of the religious institute, Montfort Brothers of St. Gabriel, because of the confusion which resulted due to three other schools in Singapore using the name Holy Innocents', namely Holy Innocents' Boys School, Holy Innocents' High School, and Holy Innocents' English School.

By the 1960s, Montfort School was recognised by some for its quality education provided by the Brothers of St Gabriel in the Upper Serangoon District.

In 1974, the full school was split into Montfort Junior and Montfort Secondary.

In 1984, a decision was made by the Old Montfortian Association (OMA), led by its president, Lim Boon Heng, to relocate Montfort Junior and Secondary Schools to make them comparable to the newer Government Schools. A Building Fund Committee was formed to raise the funds to finance the building project, the cost of which amounted to $24 million. Capital grant from the Government was $18.5 million, and the schools had to raise $5.5 million. Piling began in August 1989 at the new site at Hougang Avenue 8, immediately after a ground-breaking ceremony which was officiated by Mgr Gregory Yong, on 12 August 1989. The main building works of the two schools started in March 1990 and took about 21 months to complete.

=== Progress as Montfort Secondary School ===
On 2 January 1992, the two schools, Montfort Junior and Montfort Secondary, started functioning at their new premises as separate institutions. In 1997, the school underwent repairs and redecoration.

At the end of 2009, Montfort Secondary School underwent major redevelopment works which was under the Programme for Rebuilding and Improving Existing Schools (PRIME). The school was opened on 2 January 2012 and Montfort Secondary School returned to its Hougang location.

Montfort celebrated its 90th anniversary in 2006 with a 90 km run to its former location and a thanksgiving mass conducted by the Archbishop of Singapore, Nicholas Chia, a former pupil of the school. The mass was held in Church of the Nativity of the Blessed Virgin Mary, the church at the old location of the school.

In 2017, Montfort had a centennial mass in Church of the Nativity of the Blessed Virgin Mary as a part of its celebrations for its 100th anniversary.

In March 2026, it was announced that the Montfort Junior would admit female students from 2028.

== Affiliations ==
Montfort Secondary School is affiliated to Catholic Junior College. Graduating students may opt to move on to Catholic Junior College with affiliation favours. Affiliation favours improves net L1R5 aggregate score by removing 2 points, the junior college has to be selected as 1st or 1st and 2nd choice school.

Mankabir Singh Sandhu is also a Benefactor.

== Academic information ==
Being a government-aided secondary school, Montfort Secondary School offers three academic streams: the four-year Express course, and the five-year Normal Course, comprising Normal (Academic) and Normal (Technical) academic tracks.

=== O Level Express course ===
The Express course is a nationwide four-year programme that leads up to the Singapore-Cambridge GCE Ordinary Level examination.

==== Academic subjects ====
The examinable academic subjects for Singapore-Cambridge GCE Ordinary Level offered by Montfort Secondary School for upper secondary level (via. streaming in secondary 2 level), as of 2017, are listed below.

Notes:

- Subjects indicated with ' * ' are mandatory.
- All students in Singapore are required to undertake a Mother Tongue Language as an examinable subject, as indicated by ' ^ '.
- "SPA" in Pure Science subjects refers to the incorporation of School-based Science Practical Assessment, which 20% of the subject result in the national examination are determined by school-based practical examinations, supervised by the Singapore Examinations and Assessment Board. The SPA Assessment has been replaced by one Practical Assessment in the 2018 O Levels.

Sciences	Language and Humanities	Arts and Aesthetics
Additional Mathematics*; Mathematics*; Physics (SPA); Chemistry (SPA)*; Biology (SPA); Science (Combined); Computing	English Language*; English Literature; Mother Tongue Language* ^; Higher Mother Tongue Language; Geography; History; Combined Humanities (Social Studies & another Humanities subject at elective level)*	Art; Design & Technology; Food & Nutrition; Music

=== Normal Course ===
The Normal Course is a nationwide 4-year programme leading to the Singapore-Cambridge GCE Normal Level examination, which runs either the Normal (Academic) curriculum or Normal (Technical) curriculum, abbreviated as N(A) and N(T) respectively.

==== Normal (Academic) Course ====
In the Normal (Academic) course, students offer 5-8 subjects in the Singapore-Cambridge GCE Normal Level examination. Compulsory subjects include:

- English Language
- Mother Tongue Language
- Mathematics
- Combined Humanities

A 5th year leading to the Singapore-Cambridge GCE Ordinary Level examination is available to N(A) students who perform well in their Singapore-Cambridge GCE Normal Level examination. Students can move from one course to another based on their performance and the assessment of the school principal and teachers. Students who perform exceptionally well are given opportunity to take O level Mathematics and/or Mother Tongue in Secondary 4

==== Normal (Technical) Course ====
The Normal (Technical) course prepares students for a technical-vocational education at the Institute of Technical Education. Students will offer 5-7 subjects in the Singapore-Cambridge GCE Normal Level examination. The curriculum is tailored towards strengthening students’ proficiency in English and Mathematics. Students take English Language, Mathematics, Basic Mother Tongue and Computer Applications as compulsory subjects.

== Notable alumni ==
Montfort Secondary School has a significant Catholic population and it has produced numerous Catholic priests.

- Lim Boon Heng: former cabinet minister from 1980 to 2011
- Lee Boon Yang: former cabinet minister from 1984 to 2011
- Nicholas Chia: archbishop emeritus of Singapore
- William Goh: Archbishop of Singapore and first Singaporean Cardinal
- Lim Tean: politician
- Loh Kean Hean: national badminton player
- Suhaimi Yusof: actor, television presenter and comedian
- Desmond Ng: actor, singer, presenter and businessman
- Ng Kok Song: Singapore Investment Manager, former CIO of the GIC from 2007 to 2013, and candidate for the 2023 Singapore Presidential Election
- Wang Weiliang: Singaporean actor

== See also ==
- Catholic education in Singapore
- Secondary schools in Singapore
