= St. Gabriel's Secondary School =

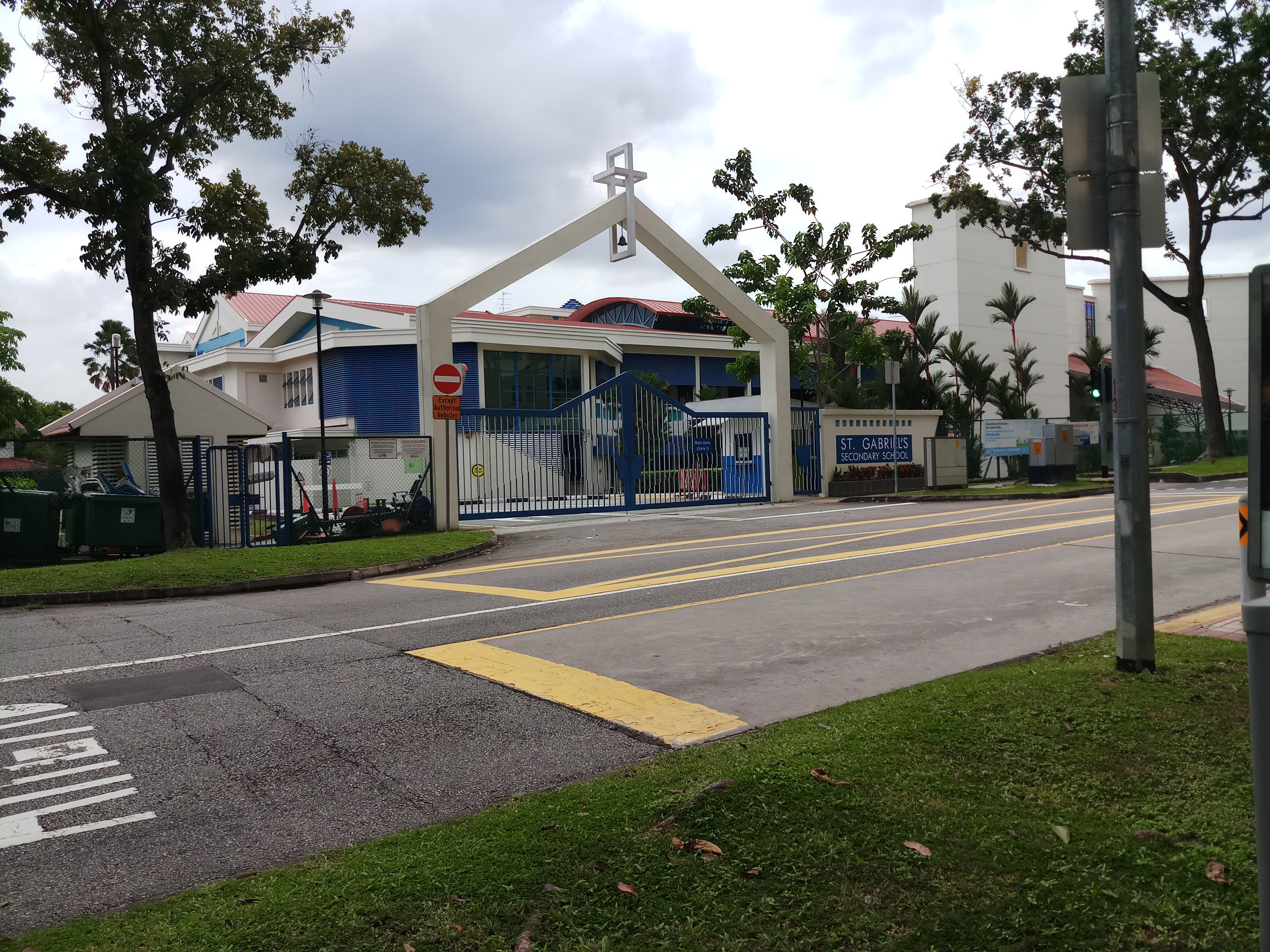

Location
- 24 Serangoon Avenue 1 Serangoon, Singapore; 1.346738°N 103.875214°E

Information
- Type: Private Catholic non-profit government-aided all-boys secondary education institution
- Motto: "Labor Omnia Vincit" (Latin) (Labour Conquers All Things)
- Religious affiliation: Christianity (Catholic)
- Patron saint: Louis de Montfort
- Established: 3 June 1953; 73 years ago
- Founder: Brother Louis Gonzaga
- Session: Single session
- School code: 7017
- Chairman: Henry Phang
- Principal: Shawn Lim
- Grades: Sec 1 to 4 (Express); Sec 1 to 5 (Normal)
- Color: Blue White
- Nickname: Gabrielites
- Feeder schools: St. Gabriel's Primary School
- Website: http://www.stgabrielssec.moe.edu.sg

St. Gabriel's Secondary School (SGSS), often known as "St. Gabs" for short, is a government-aided Roman Catholic all-boys' secondary school in Serangoon, Singapore. Founded in 1953, it is affiliated with St. Gabriel's Primary School and Catholic Junior College. It is one of the seven institutions governed by St Gabriel's Foundation, as well as one of the seven Gabrielite schools in Singapore.

== History ==
St. Gabriel's School opened its doors on 3 June 1953 (costing S$175,000 with a government contribution of S$71,000) and stood at the junction of Hillside Drive and Upper Serangoon Road. Under the supervision of the founder Reverend Brother Louis Gonzaga and seven pioneer teachers, the school accepted 212 pupils for its first intake, consisting of only five classes: two of Primary 1, one each of Primary 2, Standard 1 and Standard 2. The school was officially declared open on 13 December that year by Michel Olcomendy, Bishop of the Diocese of Singapore and Malacca. In 1954, Brother Elzear became (principal).

Brother Louis Gonzaga took over as director in 1955 and Brother Elzear left to take over management of the parish school in Johor Bahru. In 1958, under the supervision of Brother Camillus, the afternoon session began functioning on its own. Brother Raymond was made director. The year 1958 also marked the publication of the first school magazine, St. Gabriel's School Annual.

In 1959, the school had its first Secondary Four class, thus attaining the status of a full school. Under the leadership of Brother Adolphus, the class sat for the Overseas School Certificate Examinations (Cambridge) and achieved a high passing rate of 90%.

Brother Emmanuel took over the reins in 1961. Leo Remedios and Paul Lee became first two senior assistants of the school. 1961 also marked the formation of St. Gabriel's Old Boys' Association. Brother Noel became the director in 1963.

By 1968, St. Gabriel's School had a total of 47 classes for both the morning and afternoon sessions, with an enrolment of 2,000 students. The school was reaching its available capacity. To solve this problem, the primary section of the school was relocated to a new building on Highland Road on 2 January 1969 and officially declared open on 12 July that year, hence the creation of two separate schools, namely St. Gabriel's Primary School and St. Gabriel's Secondary School.

With the establishment of the Primary School, the Secondary School was reorganised, with a shift in emphasis towards technical education. Some premises were converted into machine and electrical workshops to cater to the needs of pupils of SGSS and three neighbouring schools. Brother Emmanuel took over the reins again in 1969 following the sudden death of Brother Noel. Leadership was passed on to Brother Edmund James in 1974 and Peter Tan was appointed Senior Assistant of the school.

The Brothers of St. Gabriel's were at the helm of the school for 30 years (1953–1983) before the leadership was passed on to lay principals in 1984. In line with Ministry of Education's guidelines, the school went single-session in 1986. The school had its first female principal, Ng Peng Hock, in 1990.

In May 1992, St. Gabriel's moved to its current premises at Serangoon Avenue 1 and was officially opened on 21 August 1993. At present, the school teaches the default GCE 'O' and 'N' Level syllabus as outlined by the Ministry of Education.

== Academic achievements ==
An early example of academic success for St. Gabriel's came in 1970 when the school attained 71% passes in the Senior Cambridge examination results.

St. Gabriel's School produced its first President's Scholar in 1978 (Dr. Ramani, graduated 1975). The school has its second President's Scholar, Francis Chong, in 1989.

In the 2009 National Secondary School Rankings, St. Gabriel's Secondary School was ranked a Band 3 and 8 (Normal and Express respectively). The school was also awarded the Achievement Award for Academic Value-Added in years 2007-2009 and Sustained Achievement Award for Uniformed Group, Aesthetics and Sports in years 2008-2009.

The school has also met the requirements for the Singapore Quality Class (SQC) for business excellence with effect from 31 January 2008.

Since 1998, St. Gabriel's has achieved the Academic Value-Added Award for the O-Level Examinations. It has also received the Sustained Achievement Awards for Uniformed Groups since 2002.

== Music ==
The school has been noted for its band (now called the Concert Band), which has been giving public performances since 1969. In 1971 the band was one of three from Singapore to win a competition to perform in Kuala Lumpur to promote goodwill between Singapore and Malaysia. It undertook another tour of Malaysia in 1981. The band won a Gold at the Singapore Youth Festival (SYF) in 1999, 2007 and 2009, followed by a distinction in 2013, 2015 and 2025

The school choir, the St. Gabriel's Secondary School Vocal Ensemble, was one of the first all-boys secondary school choirs in Singapore. It won a Gold in the Singapore Youth Festival (SYF) in 2011, followed by a distinction in both the 2013 and 2015 SYF, under the changes in the system. It often has collaborations with other schools, namely Hwa Chong Institution, St. Margaret's Secondary School, Methodist Girls' School, Holy Innocents' High School and Presbyterian High School. One example of such a collaboration is their biannual concert, SingOut, which is held together with Presbyterian High School and Holy Innocents' High School.

The guitar ensemble won gold and silver in SYF in 2009 and 2011 respectively.

== Sports ==
Although the school does not have an annual sports day, it states that sports facilities and equipment are readily available to students. Badminton nets are set up on the parade square, and the indoor sports hall is available for students wishing to play futsal. There is an inter-class soccer tournament for Secondary 3, and the possibility of expanding this idea to other levels and sports was under consideration at the end of 2011.

At national level, St. Gabriel's won first in table tennis in 2009 and again in 2011. In past years it has won second in golf and third in judo.

In 2009 it attracted attention because five of its table tennis team's seven members were from China.

== School crest and motto ==
School badge (1953-2007)

School crest (2007–present)

The school crest was formally introduced in 2007 to replace the school badge (1953–2007) and is now used by all Gabrielite institutions. This is in line with the St. Gabriel's Foundation's aim to forge a common identity for all Gabrielite institutions in the Southeast Asia region. Components of the school crest are as follows:

A.M. with the lily flower: "A.M." is an abbreviation for "Ave Maria". It represents the greeting of the Angel Gabriel to Mary. It also shows the Patron Saint St. Louis de Monfort's strong devotion to Our Lady.

D+S with a cross: D.S. comes from the French words "Dieu Seul", which can be translated as "God alone". God Alone is the all-motivating force in the life of St. Louis Marie de Montfort.

Sailboat at sea: represents the hardships experienced through life. Just like the sailors at sea, if they are able to face hardship and overcome difficulties, anyone can come out being better people.

Star and the man in the boat: symbolizes the star of the sea, where seamen navigate to their destination in the vast ocean. If we are focused on the essential values of life, we shall reach our ultimate destiny in life. The star of the sea shall be the guiding light that lights up the way in our life.

Olive branches: symbolizes peace and prosperity. It is thus the duty of each one to promote peace in the world, a peace that will last. Coupled with peace is prosperity, which connotes not only the generation of wealth but also the integral development of human society.

Labor Omnia Vincit: Latin for "Labour conquers all things". Hard work embodied in diligence and perseverance leads one to achieve greater things in life.

== Uniform and discipline ==
St. Gabriel's students wear white shirts, with dark blue short trousers in Secondary 1 and 2, and dark blue long trousers in Secondary 3, 4 and 5. School ties must be worn on Mondays.

For significant breaches of school discipline, the standard consequence is corporal punishment in the form of caning on the buttocks over clothing. In most cases, the punishment is carried out privately in the school office under the principal or vice principal's supervision. Such punishments are preceded and followed by counselling; parents are also informed. Students who are late to school for a sixth time in one term receive two strokes of the cane.

Brother Emmanuel, principal of St Gabriel's from 1961 to 1963 and again from 1969 to 1974, has been described by the Catholic News as "a disciplinarian whose cane has graced the backsides of many boys". He is quoted as saying that many of those he caned had told him of the need for the discipline they received from him. In his view, the punishment must be a careful, considered ceremony: "No one should ever cane a boy on impulse", he said. As of 2012, a 78-year-old Brother Emmanuel was still on the school's management committee as supervisor.

In 1970, seven or eight boys were found to be smoking cannabis, but the problem was stamped out with counselling, guidance and warnings, according to the principal.

== Exchange programmes ==
The school has annual exchange programmes with Kitago Junior High School in Miyazaki Miyazaki Prefecture, Japan.

== Affiliation ==
The school is affiliated with St. Gabriel's Primary School (SGPS), giving SGPS students priority for admission, as well as Catholic Junior College. St. Gabriel's is also affiliated to the Roman Catholic Archdiocese of Singapore and the Monfort Brothers of Christian Instruction of St Gabriel. Other Gabrielite Schools in Singapore include Assumption English School, Montfort Secondary School, Montfort Junior School and Assumption Pathway School.

Contrary to popular belief, St. Gabriel's is not affiliated with the Institute of the Brothers of the Christian Schools or any of its schools. It does maintain friendly relationships with them, however.

== Past principals ==
- Brother Louis Gonzaga (1953–1954) (founder)
- Rev. Brother Elzear (1954–1957) (first full-time director)
- Brother Louis Gonzaga (1957–1958)
- Brother Raymond (1958–1959)
- Brother Adolphus (1959–1961)
- Brother Emmanuel (1961–1963)
- Brother Noel (1963–1969)
- Brother Emmanuel (1969–1974)
- Brother Edmund James (1974–1983)

- John Teo (1984)
- Harold Mathieu (1985–1986)
- Andrew Ng (1987–1989)
- Ng Peng Hock (1990–1996)
- Winston Hodge (1997–1998)
- Adolphus Tan (1999–2004)
- Marcel Lee (2005–2013)
- Stephen Chin (2013-2020)
- Shawn Lim (2020–present)

== Notable alumni ==
- Indra Sahdan Daud – Singaporean football player
- Hariss Harun – Singaporean football player, captain for the Singapore national team
- Gerald Koh – radio DJ
- Anumanthan Kumar – Singaporean football player
- Louis Ng – Singaporean politician, Member of Parliament for Nee Soon GRC
- Nicholas Ng – managing director, FoodXervices
- Hafiz Abu Sujad – Singapore national football player
- Finian Tan – venture capitalist
- Tan Tai Yong – Nominated Member of Parliament (2014–2015), president of Yale-NUS College (2017–2022)
- Jin Cheng – Chinese golfer
