= CHIJ Secondary (Toa Payoh) =

- 圣婴女子中学（大巴窑） Sekolah Menengah CHIJ (Toa Payoh)
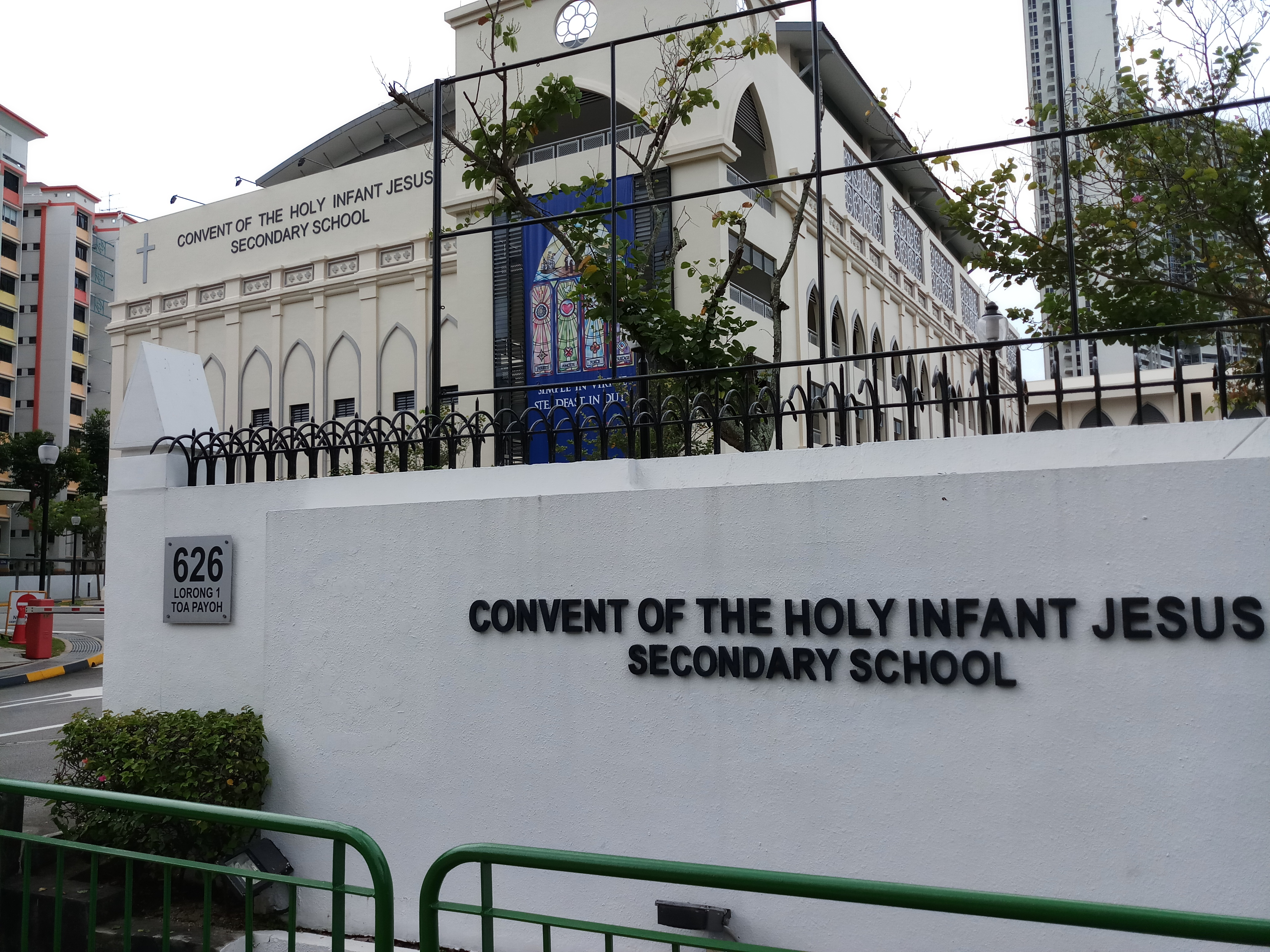

Location
- 626 Lorong 1 Toa Payoh, 319764; Singapore; 1.3323°N 103.8428°E

Information
- Type: Autonomous; Girls' Secondary
- Motto: Simple in Virtue, Steadfast in Duty
- Established: 1854; 172 years ago
- Session: Single session
- School code: 7004
- Principal: Rachel Lee
- Enrolment: approx. 1500
- Colour: Blue White
- Website: www.chijsec.edu.sg

CHIJ Secondary (Toa Payoh) is a government-aided autonomous Catholic girls' secondary school in Toa Payoh, Singapore. Founded in 1854, the school is the oldest of the 11 Convent of the Holy Infant Jesus (CHIJ) schools in Singapore. The school is currently recognised as a Centre of Excellence for Language and the Arts.

== History ==
=== Before 1900 ===
The school was established around 1854, as the Convent for the Holy Infant Jesus, and as of 1862, housed a school as well as an orphanage. In 1881, the school was declared an aided school.

=== Victoria Street compound ===
In 1929, the school opened a hostel for young women. In January 1942, the school was closed and remained so until 1945. In 1951, a new S$390,000 classroom block was constructed and three years later, the school celebrated its centenary.

=== Move to Toa Payoh ===
In 1972, it was announced that the government was taking over the Victoria Street site of the school, and as compensation, a new site in Toa Payoh would be given to it. The school moved to its new location in Toa Payoh in December 1983, and as a result, its name was changed to Convent of the Holy Infant Jesus(Toa Payoh).

The school became autonomous in 1994 and from 2003 to 2006, the school was moved to a holding site along Thomson Road as the Toa Payoh premises were renovated under the PRIME scheme.

== Identity & culture ==
=== Motto ===
"Simple Dans Ma Vertu, Forte Dans Mon Devoir" a French motto which means "Simple in my Virtue, Strong (for a female speaker) in my Duty", loosely anglicized as "Simple in Virtue, Steadfast in Duty".

=== Uniform ===
Students wear a white blouse with a Peter Pan collar beneath a knee-length, blue pinafore with a blue belt at the waist. Underneath the prescribed uniform, bras bearing only the colours of white, light-grey, or beige may be worn. Shorts are also worn under the pinafore for added modesty. Councillors, previously known as prefects, wear a pin above the school badge. Council badges are green for junior councillors, white for councillors and 'noblesse oblige' for councillors in the executive committee. Committee members of co-curricular activities (CCA) wear a silver badge with the words 'CCA Committee' on it. The heads of the CCA wear a gold badge with the words 'CCA Leader'.

During official engagements, students representing the school (councillors on most occasions) wear the formal uniform consisting of a long-sleeved white blouse, a white pencil skirt, a navy blue blazer with the school crest on the left chest, along with a navy blue tie and a pair of black court shoes.

== Affiliation ==
CHIJ Secondary (Toa Payoh) is affiliated to CHIJ Primary (Toa Payoh), and Catholic Junior College. CHIJ Secondary (Toa Payoh) is considered unofficially to be the 'sister' school of Saint Joseph's Institution (SJI).

== Academic Information ==
Being a government secondary school, CHIJ Secondary School offers three academic streams, namely the four-year Express course, as well as the Normal Course, comprising Normal (Academic) and Normal (Technical) academic tracks. For cohorts 2024 and beyond, students will be posted to 3 different posting groups: Groups 1,2 and 3. This was implemented to help guide new students through secondary one.

=== O Level Express Course ===
The Express Course is a nationwide four-year programme that leads up to the Singapore-Cambridge GCE Ordinary Level examination.

==== Academic subjects ====
The examinable academic subjects for Singapore-Cambridge GCE Ordinary Level offered by CHIJ Secondary School for upper secondary level (via. streaming in secondary 2 level), as of 2017, are listed below.

Notes:

1. Subjects indicated with ' * ' are mandatory subjects.
2. All students in Singapore are required to undertake a Mother Tongue Language as an examinable subject, as indicated by ' ^ '.
3. "SPA" in Pure Science subjects refers to the incorporation of School-based Science Practical Assessment, which 20% of the subject result in the national examination are determined by school-based practical examinations, supervised by the Singapore Examinations and Assessment Board. The SPA Assessment has been replaced by one Practical Assessment in the 2018 O Levels.

Sciences	Language & Hunanities	Arts & Aesthetics
Additional Mathematics; Mathematics*; Physics (SPA); Chemistry (SPA)*; Biology (SPA); Science (Combined)	English Language*; English Literature; Mother Tongue Language* ^; Higher Mother Tongue Language; Geography; History; Combined Humanities (Social Studies & another Humanities subject at elective level)*	Art; Design & Technology; Food & Nutrition; Music; POA (principles of accounts); DEP(Drama elective program )

=== Normal Course ===
The Normal Course is a nationwide 4-year programme leading to the Singapore-Cambridge GCE Normal Level examination, which runs either the Normal (Academic) curriculum or Normal (Technical) curriculum, abbreviated as N(A) and N(T) respectively.

==== Normal (Academic) Course ====
In the Normal (Academic) course, students offer 5-8 subjects in the Singapore-Cambridge GCE Normal Level examination. Compulsory subjects include:

- English Language
- Mother Tongue Language
- Mathematics
- Combined Humanities

A 5th year leading to the Singapore-Cambridge GCE Ordinary Level examination is available to N(A) students who perform well in their Singapore-Cambridge GCE Normal Level examination. Students can move from one course to another based on their performance and the assessment of the school principal and teachers.

==== Normal (Technical) Course ====
The Normal (Technical) course prepares students for a technical-vocational education at the Institute of Technical Education. Students will offer 5-7 subjects in the Singapore-Cambridge GCE Normal Level examination. The curriculum is tailored towards strengthening students’ proficiency in English and Mathematics. Students take English Language, Mathematics, Basic Mother Tongue and Computer Applications as compulsory subjects.

=== CHIJ Centre of Excellence for Language and the Arts ===
CHIJ Secondary was awarded the South Zone Centre of Excellence (CoE) for Language and the Arts in Aug 2007.

== Notable alumni ==
- Helena Wong Kar Mun: National weightlifter
- Jacintha Abisheganaden: Singer and actress
- Joan Pereira: Member of Parliament for Tanjong Pagar GRC
- Violet Sleigh: Miss Malaya (1953)
