= Hai Sing Catholic School =

- 海星天主教中学; Sekolah Katolik Hai Sing

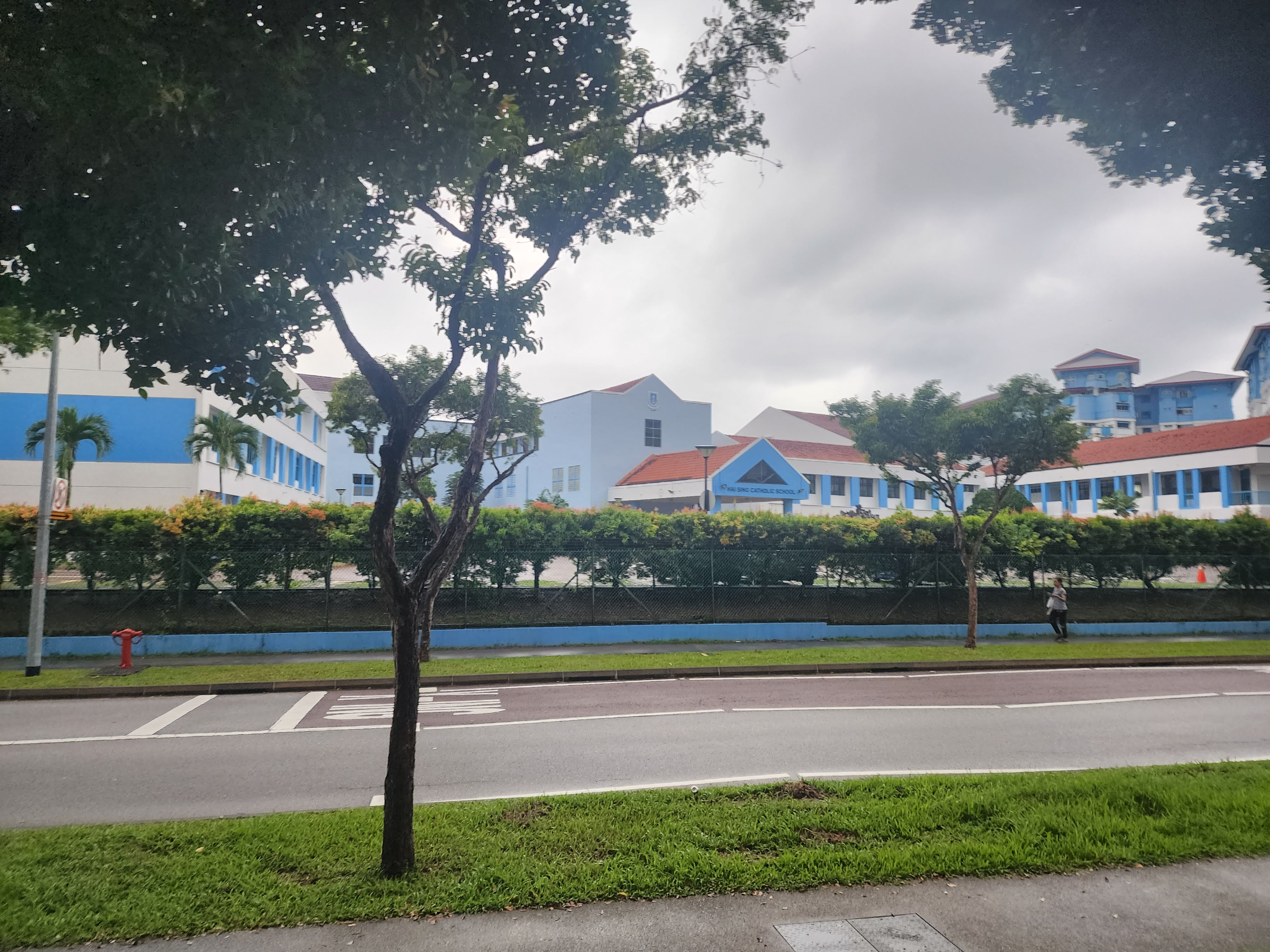
- The view of Hai Sing Catholic School from right outside the school at the temporary holding site.

Location
- 9 Pasir Ris Drive 6, Singapore 519421; Singapore; 1.3697324°N 103.9660977°E

Information
- Type: Government-aided; Co-educational; Catholic school
- Motto: Ad Veritatem per Caritatem (Latin) (To Truth (God) through Charity)
- Religious affiliation: Christianity (Catholic)
- Established: 1959; 67 years ago Incorporating Hai Sing Girls' High School (est. 1959) & Hai Sing High School (est. 1990)
- Session: Single session
- School code: 7031
- Principal: Ms. Adeline Lim
- Teaching staff: Approx. 120
- Enrolment: Approx. 1200
- Colour: Blue White
- Affiliation: Catholic Junior College
- Website: haisingcatholic.moe.edu.sg

Hai Sing Catholic School (HSC) is a co-educational government-aided Catholic secondary school in Pasir Ris, Singapore. Founded by the Franciscan Missionaries of Mary (FMM) sisters in 1959, it is affiliated to Catholic Junior College. The school was temporarily located at its holding site at 15 Pasir Ris Street 21 from 2023 to 2025 due to the school undergoing the Programme for Rebuilding and Improving Existing schools (PRIME). They shifted back to their upgraded permanent site at 9 Pasir Ris Drive 6 on 18 November 2025.

== History ==
=== Hai Sing Girls' High School (1959-1990) ===
Hai Sing Catholic School was founded in 1959 by the Franciscan Missionaries of Mary (FMM) sisters as Hai Sing Girls' High School with 170 students. Lessons were initially conducted at Convent Primary School in Punggol. It was the first girls' high school in Serangoon and the second Catholic one in Singapore. From 1960 to 1961, a three-storey building was constructed at the 7 1/4 mile mark of Upper Serangoon, with an office, science laboratories, 18 classrooms and a common room for teachers.

In 1972, a new 800-seat school hall was constructed. Six years later, the school was named one of the 14 outstanding Chinese secondary schools in Singapore and was initially included as a candidate school for the Special Assistance Plan (SAP). However, with the concern from the Ministry of Education over the surplus of school places that might hinder the success of the scheme, the number of SAP schools were amended to nine, which excluded Hai Sing, along with three other institutions. Later in 1978, Hai Sing was named one of the 14 outstanding Chinese Secondary Schools in Singapore.

In 1981, Hai Sing Girls' High School started taking in English stream students and was converted from a Chinese medium school to an integrated school. In 1984, the school celebrated its Silver Jubilee.

=== Hai Sing High School (1990-1999) ===
In January 1990, Hai Sing Girls' High School changed its policy to admit male students, as well as students of other races. As such, the school name was changed to Hai Sing High School and went co-educational. In March 1990, the school moved from Upper Serangoon Road into Pasir Ris New Town, with the official opening ceremony held on 11 July 1992.

=== Progress as Hai Sing Catholic School (1999 – present) ===
On 11 July 1999, Hai Sing High School changed its name to its current name, Hai Sing Catholic School, to emphasise its Catholic status. The school emblem was also modified.

In 2008, Hai Sing Catholic School won multiple achievement awards for their outstanding academic and non-academic (Co-curricular activity-related) achievements. Academic awards include an Honour Roll for the Sustained Achievement Award and a regular Achievement Award. They were also one of the select schools to achieve an Honour Roll, along with a full 4-star award for 4 different non-academic achievements.

In 2009, the school celebrated its Golden Jubilee, marking 50 years of education for the school.

In 2010, Hai Sing Catholic School received the Gold Synergiser award and Gold Stylo Milo award at Robotest 2010, held at Rulang Primary School. It also came in 1st as Gold for the Secondary category at the National Singapore VEX Robotics Championships 2010.

Later in 2011, the school started taking in students from the Direct School Admission (DSA) programme for the Robotics CCA.

In 2014, Hai Sing Catholic School celebrated its 55th anniversary by organizing the 'Hai Carnival 2014'. It was also the first year that the school started the Hai School Musical programme and had a school exchange programme with a partner school in Japan, Sagano High School. It also attained an Applied Learning Programme (ALP) in Robotics and Engineering.

In 2015, Hai Sing Catholic School emerged as the champions in the middle school category at the VEX Robotics World Championship in Kentucky, United States. They also were the Middle School Robot Skills World Champion, coming in at 2nd position and 3rd position. The school also organised a 50 km run to celebrate Singapore's Golden Jubilee.

In 2017, Hai Sing Catholic School won the championship in the middle school category at the VEX Robotics World Championship in Kentucky, United States. The team also snagged another top honour, the Robot Skills award. The school was featured in the local newspapers for their effort.

In 2019, the school celebrated its Diamond jubilee, marking 60 years of education for the school on 6 July 2019, under the motto "Celebrating the HAI Life".

In 2021, Hai Sing Catholic School was originally scheduled for the Programme for Rebuilding and Improving Existing schools (PRIME) from January 2022 to December 2023 but was delayed to start from January 2023 till December 2024 due to the COVID-19 pandemic in Singapore. The holding site for the school needed more time due to construction delays caused by the pandemic.

In 2023, the school moved from its permanent site at 9 Pasir Ris Drive 6 to its temporary holding site at 15 Pasir Ris Street 21. It will move back to its permanent location at 9 Pasir Ris Drive 6 tentatively in December 2025.

== Affiliation ==
Hai Sing Catholic School is one of sixteen Catholic secondary schools in Singapore recognised by the Archdiocese, although it admits students all of religions or none. Due to its status as a Catholic school, Hai Sing is affiliated with Catholic Junior College. After students from the Express course and Secondary 5 students from the Normal-Academic course receive their Singapore-Cambridge GCE Ordinary Level examination results, they can apply for admission to Catholic Junior College and receive two bonus points due to affiliation.

== School identity & culture ==
=== Uniform and attire ===
All students are attired in a two-piece ensemble consisting of a shirt top, and a bottom piece which varies according to the student's gender and/or academic level.

For the top, all students wear a white unisex, short-sleeved, buttoned-down shirt, with the collar band accented in the colour of the school's traditional blue. The shirt is emblazoned with the school's crest over the breast pocket. It also has a small band of cloth for students to pin their nametag.

For the bottoms, all girls wear knee-length A-Line skirts solid in the colour of the school's traditional blue. The skirt has two inverted Box Pleats down the front, but sewn down roughly a quarter of the length of the skirt from the top. Secondary 1-2 boys wear Bermudas solid in the colour of the school's traditional blue; they switch to long pants when they are promoted to Secondary 3 and above.

The school's uniform also includes accessories, namely a name tag and, during specific days and/or occasions, a tie of regular width sometimes accompanied with a tie pin.

Students pin a simple plastic, rectangular tag, engraved with their name in Sans-serif font, above their breast pocket on their left, coloured according to the year of their enrolment. In the past, the school's crest was also engraved on the left of the tag, but this design choice has long since been discontinued. This tag serves as the student's name tag and a visible display of their academic seniority.

Hai Sing Catholic's neckwear of choice is the tie regardless of gender. The design of the Hai Sing Catholic's school tie has varied greatly over the years but it is always in the colour of the school's traditional blue, and decorated with white embroidered elements like the full name of the school and/or the school crest in some fashion, either emblazoned upon it, or used as repeating motifs. Similarly varied throughout history is the use of a school tie pin.

Student councillors are required to wear the school tie during the week that they are on duty.

For Physical Education (PE) classes, students change into a sporting outfit consisting of a round neck T-shirt in the colourway of the school's traditional blue and white, plus the student's house colours (discontinued), paired with black short trousers. PE attire is the same for all academic levels and genders. As of the year 2021, a new uniform/PE polo shirt was introduced and took over as the PE attire. It can also be used as the top for uniforms. Note that it does not have a band of cloth for students to pin their nametags and students are not required to when using the polo. It is a dark blue, cyan and white shirt with the school logo at where the breast pocket would be. The back is dark blue with the school motto 'Ad Veritatem Per Caritatem' spelled in cyan. The collar is dark blue and cyan

In the way of footwear, for any attire, students are expected to wear practical athletic shoes capable of facilitating athletic activities. Shoes can only be in an acceptable shade of white, if not white, with no discernible markings or branding in a hue significantly different from that of the shoe as a whole. Socks, white/close to white and plain of design, must be worn.

=== Discipline ===
Any student whose offences include any misbehaviour contrary to the good order and discipline of the school will face disciplinary actions to be decided upon by the Principal, Vice-Principal and the school's Student Management Committee. Possible disciplinary actions include detention class, caning (for male students only) or suspension (either in-school or out-of-school), depending on the seriousness of the offence committed and the frequency of its recurrence. For offences that involve violation of the law, the school reserves the right to refer the matter to the Police and/or relevant external agencies.

Students caught smoking, vaping or in possession of any tobacco-related products will receive a three-day suspension along with a referral to an external agency, with male students liable for caning. Other serious offences include (but are not limited to) vandalism, gang-related behaviour, arson, forgery, causing hurt to others or any other offence involving violation of the law.

=== School crest ===
The current school crest is a shining star with a boat underneath it, to represent the school as the "Star of the Sea". A banner contains the Latin words, Ad Veritatem Per Caritatem (To truth (God) through charity) below the logo. The school crest was created in 1959 under the name, Hai Sing Girls' School. After they changed their policy to accept boys and students of other races in 1990, the school crest was redesigned under the name Hai Sing Catholic School in 1992 after changing it from Hai Sing High School.

=== Anthem ===
Hai Sing Catholic School has two school anthems. The school song was originally in Chinese but is now sung in English and Chinese during assemblies. The school hymn is fully in English. The songs are sung on Monday and Friday, respectively.

=== Hai Carnival ===
An annual event called the Hai Carnival is held usually during August. The school holds the event yearly with classes from Secondary 1 to 3 setting up food and games stalls. Before the event, students are given tickets to sell to relatives and family for the event funding. A lucky draw is also held where participants can win multiple goods and prizes. A blood donation drive led by the school's St John's Brigade (CCA group) is also held. Students of the school who are 16 years or older can donate, including members of the public such as parents, or alumni who attend the Carnival. There is a lucky draw held at the end of the carnival for all ticket holders, where students, the public and teachers can win multiple prizes.

=== Overseas trips and exchange programmes ===
Annually, the schools organises overseas trips for its students to Vietnam, Malaysia, China and Indonesia. The school also organises an annual exchange programme with Sagano High School in Kyoto, Japan which usually takes place in June.

== Academic Information ==
Being an integrated secondary school running a standard academic curriculum, Hai Sing Catholic School offers three academic streams, namely the four-year Express course, as well as the Normal Course, comprising Normal (Academic) and Normal (Technical) academic tracks.

=== O Level Express Course ===
The Express Course is a nationwide four-year programme that leads up to the Singapore-Cambridge GCE Ordinary Level examination.

==== Academic subjects ====
The examinable academic subjects for Singapore-Cambridge GCE Ordinary Level offered by Hai Sing Catholic School for the upper secondary level (via. streaming in secondary 2 level), as of 2019, are listed below.

Notes:

1. Subjects indicated with ' * ' are mandatory subjects.
2. All students in Singapore are required to undertake a Mother Tongue Language as an examinable subject, as indicated by ' ^ '.
3. "SPA" in Pure Science subjects refers to the incorporation of School-based Science Practical Assessment, which 20% of the subject result in the national examination is determined by school-based practical examinations, supervised by the Singapore Examinations and Assessment Board. The SPA Assessment has been replaced by one Practical Assessment in the 2018 “O” Levels.

Sciences	Language & Humanities	Arts & Aesthetics
Additional Mathematics; Mathematics*; Physics (SPA); Chemistry (SPA)*; Biology (SPA); Science (Combined Physics/Chemistry); Science (Combined Biology/Chemistry)	English Language*; English Literature; Mother Tongue Language* ^; Higher Mother Tongue Language; Geography; History; Combined Humanities (Social Studies & another Humanities subject at elective level)*	Art; Design & Technology; Food & Nutrition; Music; Principles of Accounts

=== Normal Courses ===
The Normal Course is a nationwide 4-year programme leading to the Singapore-Cambridge GCE Normal Level examination, which runs either the Normal (Academic) curriculum or Normal (Technical) curriculum, abbreviated as N(A) and N(T) respectively.

==== Normal (Academic) Course ====
In the Normal (Academic) course, students in Hai Sing Catholic School normally offer 6-7 subjects in the Singapore-Cambridge GCE Normal Level examination. Compulsory subjects include:

- English Language
- Mother Tongue Language
- Mathematics
- Combined Humanities
- Science (Chemistry & Physics/Biology)
- Design & Technology/Art
- Principles of Account/Additional Mathematics

A 5th year leading to the Singapore-Cambridge GCE Ordinary Level examination is available to N(A) students who perform well in their Singapore-Cambridge GCE Normal Level examination. Students in the school are also able to move from one course to another based on their academic performance and the assessment of the school principal and teachers.

==== Normal (Technical) Course ====
The Normal (Technical) course prepares students for a technical-vocational education at the Institute of Technical Education. Students in Hai Sing Catholic School offer 5-7 subjects in the Singapore-Cambridge GCE Normal Level examination. The curriculum is tailored towards strengthening students’ proficiency in English and Mathematics. Compulsory subjects include:

- English Language (Syllabus T)
- Mathematics (Syllabus T)
- Basic Mother Tongue Language
- Computer Applications

From 2021 onwards, the school has started offering music as a Singapore-Cambridge GCE Normal Level subject for the Normal (Technical) course.

== Academic and arts achievements ==
Hai Sing Catholic School has won a wide array of prizes and attained many achievements in multiple diverse types of academic-based competitions.

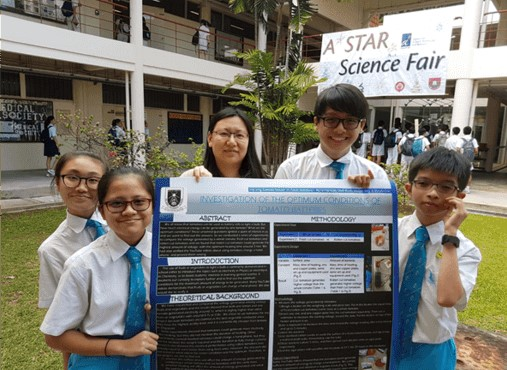
Hai Sing Catholic students participating in the East Zone A*STAR Science Fair Competition @ Victoria Junior College in 2017.

=== Science ===
In the C.B. Paul Science Quiz, the school overcame elite, prestigious schools, clinching 2 Science Talent Awards, 2 Bronze Awards, 1 Silver Award, and 2 Gold Awards.

In the NYP Science & Technology Challenge, the school positioned itself as a worthy 1st runner-up. The team was composed of 4 Secondary 3 students.

In the Innovation Programme challenge, the school obtained 2 Certificates of Commendation, along with 3 Certificates of Participation.

In the East Zone A*STAR Science Fair Competition @ Victoria Junior College, the school acquired an East Zone Category Merit Award for a project taken on by an Upper Secondary team. (Seen in the photo beside)

=== Mathematics ===
In the Singapore Mathematical Olympiad (SMO) 2017, the school secured 1 Bronze medal along with 3 Honourable Mentions.

In the same year, the school participated in the Australian Mathematics Competition (AMO) and received 3 Distinctions.

In 2018, the school took part in the Singapore and Asian Schools Math Olympiad, better known as SASMO, and attained 1 Gold Award, 5 Silver Awards, and 6 Bronze Awards.

The school also took part in the SMO 2018 Competition, winning emerging with 1 Bronze and 2 Honourable Mentions.

In 2019, the school took part in the SASMO competition and won 1 Gold Award, 2 Silver Awards, and 7 Bronze Awards. Along with these achievements, a student from the school placed 8th in the entire country in the rankings of the competition.

=== Mother Tongue Languages ===
In 2018, 3 students from the school received the Mr Kuek Seng Sik Scholarship, a scholarship given to students who are outstanding in their Mother Tongue Language. It is also given out to encourage students in learning their Mother Tongue Language. They each won a prize cash sum along with the award.

=== Art ===
At the 11th Singapore National Junior Watercolour Competition 2017, held at Hwa Chong International School, the school won a Certificate of Achievement award,

At the 12th Singapore National Junior Watercolour Competition 2018, the school clinched another Certificate of Achievement with a Highly Commended Prize. The event was held by the Singapore Watercolour Society.

== Co-curricular activities ==
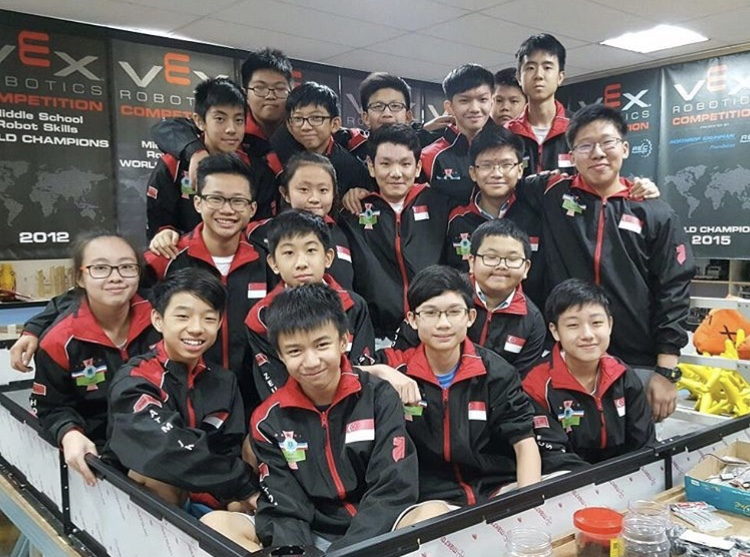
The Robotics Team after the VEX Robotics Competition 2016.

Hai Sing Catholic School offers a variety of extra-curricular activities, labelled as co-curricular activities (CCAs) by the Ministry of Education (Singapore), available to all of its students.

=== Robotics ===
The most well-known CCA at Hai Sing Catholic School. The team had snagged a wide variety of awards from events such as:

- VEX Robotics World Championships
- Singapore Vex Robotics Championships
- Asia-Pacific Vex Championships
- FIRST Tech Challenge
- Rulang Robofest
- DSTA – East Zone Robotics Competition

In 2004, Hai Robotics Club (HRC) was started in Hai Sing Catholic School. When it first started, HRC started with only modest resources in Lego-RCX and 9 students. In 2004, HRC sent its first school team to compete in the inaugural FIRST LEGO League tournament. Since then, HRC has grown to compete in various major national and international competitions. The school has won multiple World Champion Titles and Gold awards at the championships they have taken part in.

Over the years, the school has built up its resources and HRC has been expanding its training programmes into multiple platforms such as the VEX Robotics System, LEGO Mindstorms and other robotics systems.

=== Sports ===
There are 4 physical sport CCAs offered at Hai Sing Catholic School. The school Golf team at the Inter-School Golf Tournament came back with a 'C' Girls – Bronze Team award SSSC Colours (TEAM Award). The award was given out at a national level. The Archery team (please note that of 2020, Archery has stopped entries and as of 2022, is replaced with soccer) at the 6th National Interschool Archery Championship ‘C’ Division event achieved a Gold award by the Recurve girls team during the team knockout event. During the individual ranking event, the Recurve Girls Team won a silver award. During the 6th National Interschool Archery Championship ‘B’ Division, the Recurve Girls Team won a Gold award, followed by the Compound Girls Team and Recurve Boys Team, each winning the bronze award. The Taekwondo CCA has received 1 Gold, 7 Bronze and 7 SSSC Colours Award at the National Inter-School TKD (Kyorugi and Poomsae) Competitions. Most notably, the Singapore Youth Flying Club received the Champion award for the Electronic Control Line at the SYFC Inter-school Aero-modelling Competition 2015.

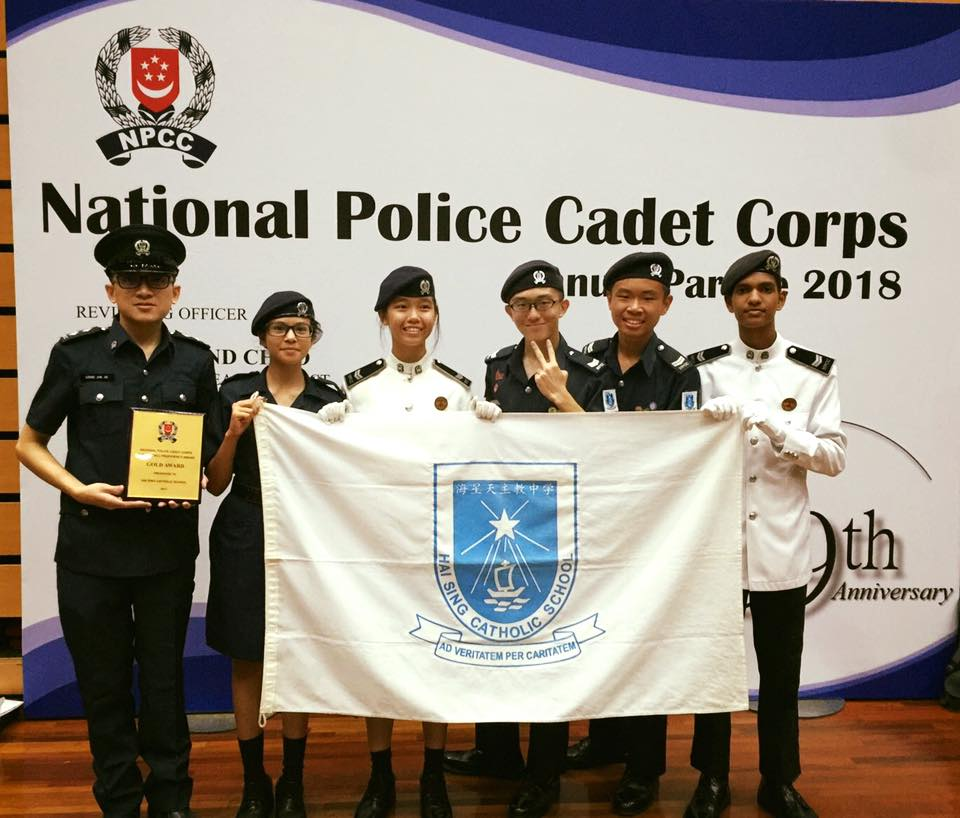
The school's National Police Cadet Corps Unit after attaining the Gold Award (7th Consecutive Gold) at the Annual Parade.

=== Visual and performing arts ===
At the Singapore Youth Central Judging Competition 2015, the Malay Dance and Choir CCAs received a Certificate of Distinction. The Modern Dance, Band and Drama CCAs received a Certificate of Accomplishment.

=== Infocomm Club ===
The school's infocomm club, which consists of PA and Photo, helps to support and ensure the smooth sailing of events in school.

=== Uniformed groups ===
The school's National Police Cadet Corps CCA (NPCC) snagged a Gold Award and Outstanding Achievement, which is earned by 5 years of sustained achievement of the gold award. At the Inter-Unit .22 Revolver Shooting Competition 2015 (Finals), the Girls' Team received a Gold award and a Khoo Boon Hui Challenge Trophy. The Boys' Team won a Bronze award. The National Cadet Corps (NCC) CCA won a Silver Award at the National Best Unit Competition in 2015. St John's Ambulance Brigade (SJAB or SJB for short) also won a Gold Award (Excellence) for 5 years sustained achievement of gold awards.

== See also ==
- Education in Singapore
- List of schools in Singapore
- List of secondary schools in Singapore
- Catholic education in Singapore
