= Church of the Nativity of the Blessed Virgin Mary, Singapore =

Historic site in Singapore

Church of the Nativity of the Blessed Virgin Mary
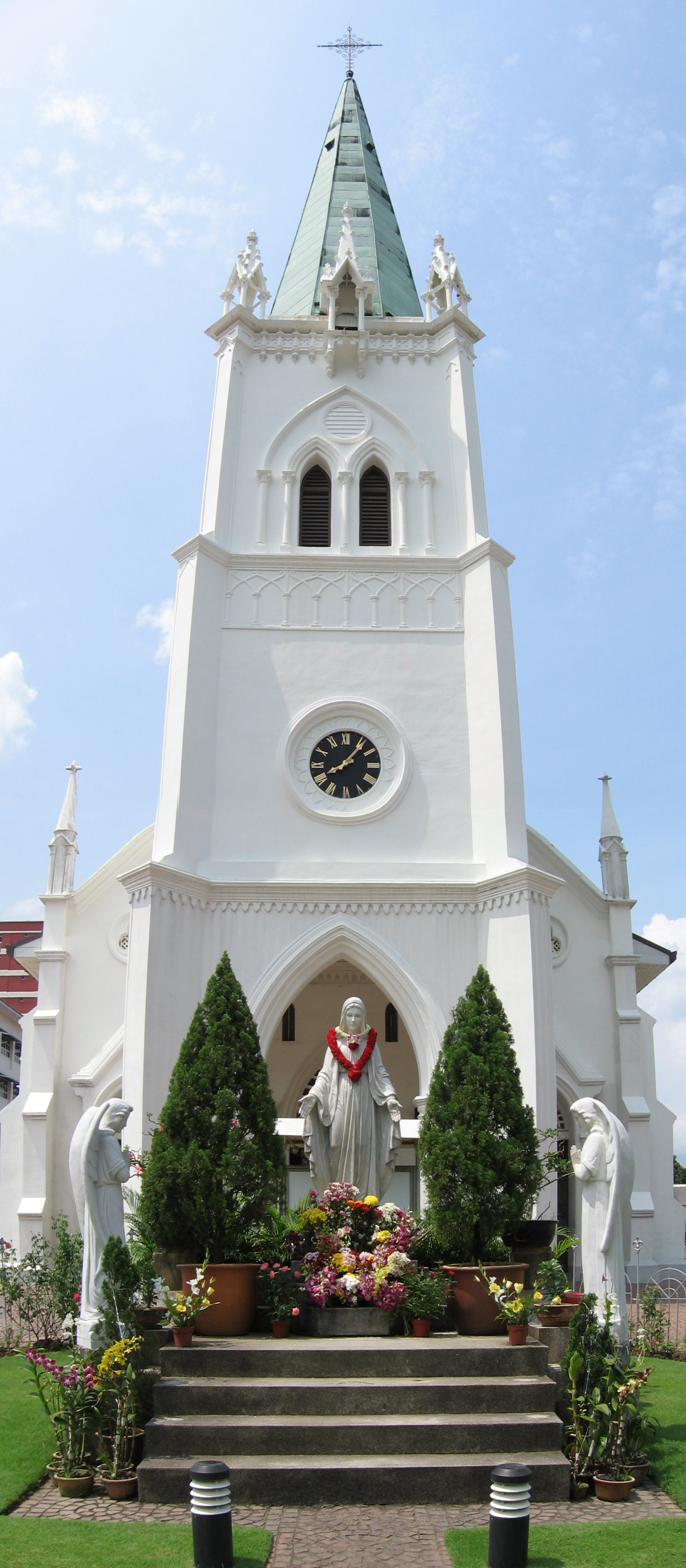
- The statue of the Blessed Virgin Mary in front of the Church of the Nativity of the Blessed Virgin Mary, Hougang, Singapore.

Religion
- Affiliation: Roman Catholic
- Diocese: Archdiocese of Singapore

Location
- Location: 1259 Upper Serangoon Road Singapore 534795
- Interactive map of Church of the Nativity of the Blessed Virgin Mary
- Coordinates: 1.365436°N 103.886271°E

Architecture
- Established: 1852

Church of the Nativity of the Blessed Virgin Mary, Singapore
- Location within Singapore
- Location: 1259 Upper Serangoon Road

History
- Built: 1901

Site notes
- Governing body: National Heritage Board

National monument of Singapore
- Designated: 10 February 2003; 23 years ago
- Reference no.: 53

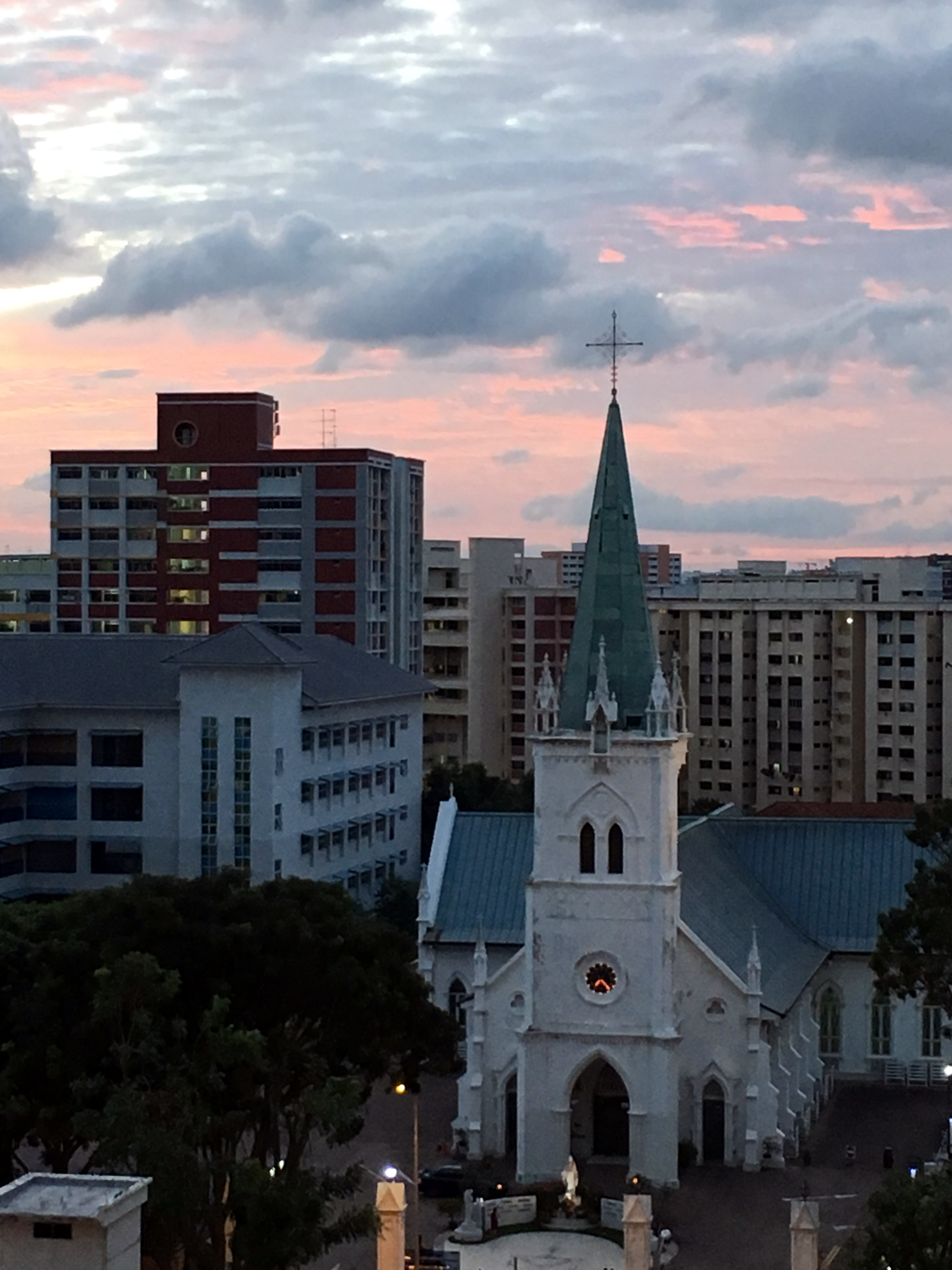
Day view of the Church

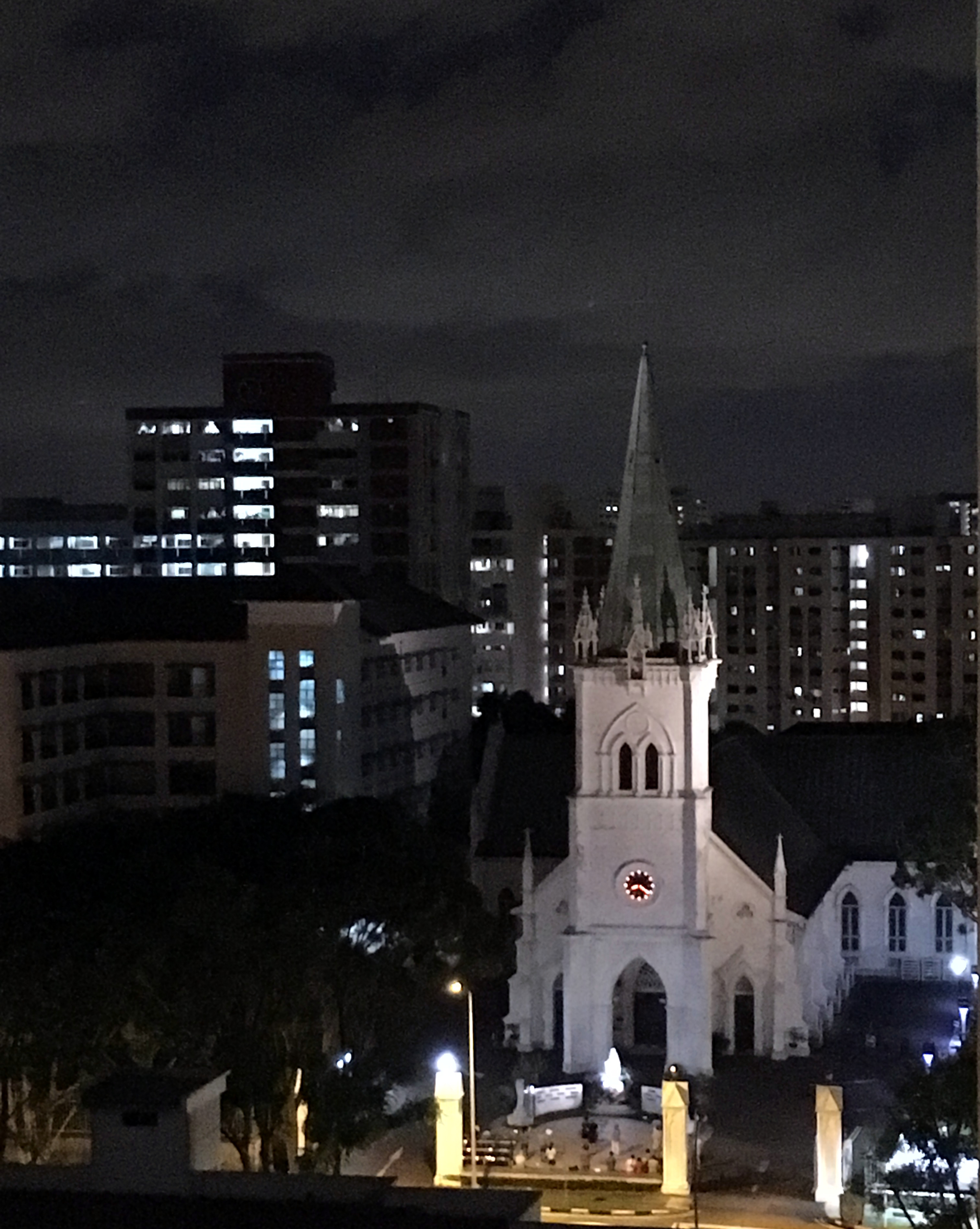
Night view of the Church

The Church of the Nativity of the Blessed Virgin Mary (Chinese: 圣母圣诞堂) is a Roman Catholic church in Singapore. It is located in Hougang, the North-East Region of Singapore, and is within the Serangoon District. It is well known as the oldest Catholic church for the Teochew community in Serangoon.

== History ==
=== Beginnings in Hougang ===
Before the arrival of pioneer priest Father Ambrose Maistre in 1852, there was already a significant Catholic community in Aukang (Teochew moniker for Hougang) or Kangkar, the area surrounding Serangoon River. He went on to set up a station to serve the Catholics in this rural district and the first baptism took place in 1853. An attap (thatched roof) chapel and small presbytery was also erected after Father Maistre acquired approximately 37-acres of land from the British East India company. It was later converted into a small brick church named St Mary's Chapel. The remainder of the land acquired was allocated to parishioners in the area for their settlement.

The parish consisted mainly of Teochew farmers and fish dealers residing in Serangoon, Hougang and Punggol. Earliest statistics recorded the presence of approximately 700 Chinese in the region. The first settlers were Chinese Catholics who hailed from Siam and Malacca whereas later migrants were mainly from Teochew Swatow in Southeastern China. Most did not migrate as a family or clan, and therefore, shared no common ancestors. While some converted to Catholicism after arriving in Singapore, missionary activities of the Dominican and Franciscan friars in Southeastern China as early as the seventeenth century meant that many already embraced the faith before their migration.

Moreover, the pioneering priests were able to forge strong ties with the Teochews residing in Hougang. It is believed that the similarities the Teochews and French priests shared – being “good conversationalists who enjoy social events” – led the Teochews to be open to evangelisation. As such, conversion of new settlers was successful as the need for an expansion of the church became apparent between 1894 and 1896. It was said that half the parishioners – mostly women and children – had to stand outside the brick chapel during Mass.

=== Construction, 1898–1901 ===
The present building of the church was commissioned to be built in 1898 to cater to the burgeoning Catholic community in the district by Father Jean Casimir Saleilles, parish priest from 1881 to 1911. It was designed in a neo-Gothic style by French priest Father Charles Bénédict Nain, and could accommodate around 650 parishioners. Located at the junction of 7^{3/4} milestones Upper Serangoon Road and Punggol Road (known as Hougang Ave 8 today), construction was completed in 1901. Officially blessed on 8 December 1901 by Bishop Rene Michel-Marie Fee, the feast day of the Immaculate Conception of the Blessed Virgin Mary, the church was renamed Church of the Nativity of the Blessed Virgin Mary.

=== Expansion, 1933 ===
However, by the 1930s, the church had to be expanded again to accommodate the growing parish; general attendance at Mass rose to 1350. The size of the original church was thus doubled with the addition of the side transepts, the sanctuary and sacristy in 1933.

Widespread activities of secret societies plaguing the area between the 1850s and 1920s meant that settlers had to seek a protector. The church soon became that protector since she had a huge congregation and “church members would stand up for one another when conflicts with outsiders arose”. Such protection would continue throughout the Japanese Occupation when the church served as a sanctuary where parishioners could hide from the Japanese.

=== Education ===
The church also played a prominent role in offering education and religious instruction to parishioners and settlers in Hougang. Tao Nan School was founded as a Chinese medium school in 1892, and is known as Holy Innocents’ High School today. Holy Innocents’ English School was then established as a parish school in 1916 to the left of the church premises. Later taken over by the Gabrielite Brothers and renamed Monfort's School in 1936. After a split by educational stages in 1992, Monfort Junior School and Monfort Secondary School still stand in Hougang today. Holy Innocents’ Chinese Girls’ School was founded in 1932. It is known as Holy Innocents’ Primary School today after it amalgamated with the primary section of Holy Innocents’ High School in 1985. Convent of the Holy Infant Jesus (CHIJ) Punggol was established in 1957 and was renamed CHIJ Our Lady of the Nativity in 2001.

The St Francis Xavier Minor Seminary was also built opposite the church in 1924 to provide instruction to potential candidates to the priesthood. It still stands at its original location, alongside the Catholic Spirituality Centre.

=== Vernacular masses ===
Vatican II introduced the use of vernacular languages in the liturgy. In Singapore, English Masses first began in 1965 and Mandarin ones in 1970. Teochew Masses were first offered in the Nativity Church in 1971 on Pentecost Sunday. Till this date, the Nativity Church remains the only Catholic church in Singapore that offers Mass in Teochew.

=== Urbanisation & resettlement, 1970s–1980s ===
Along with the founding of Singapore as an independent nation in 1965, as well as urbanisation projects between the 1960s and 1970s, came changes to the community residing in Hougang. Land surrounding the church, such as St Joseph's Lane and Kok Nam Lane, were acquired by the government. Parishioners were resettled elsewhere in Singapore, such as Whampoa, Ang Mo Kio and Marine Parade while other Singaporeans moved into Hougang with the mass building of Housing Development Board (HDB) flats in the area. As a result, the church and her surrounding area became more multilingual and multiracial instead of being predominantly Teochew Catholic.

Nonetheless, despite these changes, the church remained the centre of activities. In the 1980s especially, food and fun fairs, Feast Day processions, film shows and outings were regularly organized. Both parishioners and non-Catholics would enjoy them. New ministries, such as the Migrant Workers’ Gospel Station, were also established over the years to serve the church as well as to reach out to migrants in the vicinity.

St Anne's Church was also founded in 1963 in present-day Sengkang to accommodate the growing number of Catholics in the area.

Recognised for her “social and historical significance…, importance to the community as well as architectural merits”, the Church was gazetted a national monument on 14 January 2005 under the Preservation of Monuments Act (Cap 239) (Image 25 in Appendix C).

=== Timeline ===
1898	Foundation laid for construction of present Church building
1901	Construction completed and Church was renamed Church of the Nativity of the Blessed Virgin Mary (Nativity Church)
1916	Holy Innocents’ English School (present-day Monfort Junior School & Monfort Secondary School) founded
1924	St Francis Xavier Minor Seminary established
1926	St Joseph's Dying Aid Association officially inaugurated and registered as a society, the first from the church
1932	Holy Innocents’ Chinese Girls’ School (present-day Holy Innocents’ Primary School) founded
1933	Addition of side transepts, the sanctuary and sacristy, effectively doubling size of Church
1957	Convent of the Holy Infant Jesus (CHIJ) Punggol (present-day CHIJ Our Lady of the Nativity) founded
1963	St Anne's Church founded in present-day Sengkang to accommodate growing population in the area
1970s – 1980s	Urbanisation and construction of HDB flats in Hougang
2003	Nativity Church Kindergarten established
2012	Korean parish permanently moved to Nativity Church; Nativity Church becomes the only Catholic church in Singapore that offers Korean Mass The Nativity Church also celebrated her 160th anniversary

== Architectural features ==
Built in a neo-Gothic style, the church was initially shaped rectangular. After the addition of transepts in the 1930s, the church now takes on the form of a Latin cross. At the front end of the church stands a belfry tower capped with a spire and ornate brass cross. Rose windows decorate the façade of both transepts as well as the belfry.

To the left of the main marble altar at the centre of the church stands the Chapel of the Sacred Heart of Jesus, while the Chapel of the Immaculate Conception stands to the right. Statues of saints are enshrined in niches on the walls of the side aisles. Behind the altars are five stained-glass windows depicting, from left to right, St Francis Xavier, the Sacred Heart of Jesus, the Immaculate Conception, St Joseph, and St Therese de Lisieux respectively. The nave also holds the tombs of five former priests of the Church.

In the foreground of the entrance of the church stands an iconic statue – “The Immaculate Conception of Mary”. This marble statue was presented to the church by Sultan Ibrahim of Johor as a token of his long-standing friendship with Reverend Father Francis Chan (later installed as Bishop of Penang), parish priest of the church between 1946 and 1955.

== Ongoing activities ==
The church serves approximately 6000 parishioners today. Another 1200 parishioners attend Korean Mass ever since the Korean Catholic community has permanently shifted and been based here in 2012.

Besides religious services, the church also began running the Nativity Church Kindergarten for Pre-Nursery, Nursery, K1 and K2 children in 2003. An elderly daycare facility, Senior Connection @ Nativity, was also recently established in 2016 to provide daycare services for elderly in the district, regardless of their faith.

=== Matthew 25 ===
Responding to the then impending economic crisis, Father Henry Siew, parish priest, initiated the establishment of Matthew 25, a soup kitchen, in April 2008. The name of the soup kitchen was derived from verse 25 of Matthew, where Jesus says, “In truth, I tell you, in so far as you did this to one of the least of my brothers, you did it to me.” Matthew 25 offers free breakfast and lunch to the less privileged, regardless of their race, age, or religion. Other than serving approximately 140 residents who walk into the church premises daily, volunteers also deliver about another 190 packed meals to Senior Activity Centres in the vicinity. Free haircuts are also offered every second Tuesday of the month at the Church by the Matthew 25 ministry.

=== Priests and religious ===
- Rev. Fr Gregoire van Giang (Parish Priest)
- Rev. Fr Sam Thadathil John
- Rev. Fr Kevin Wee

=== Music ===
From humble beginnings, the music community of the Church strengthened and grown through the years. Today, the Church holds a Yamaha Electone STAGEA and a KORG Clavinova. A distinctive feature in Singapore is the high ceilings of the church which creates an acoustic hall ambience.

Most musicians of the church are self-learned musicians and have been serving in the Church for years. Many events were hosted through the years, like an Advent Presentation held on Christmas Day in 2024.

==== Choirs ====
There are five English choirs and other few Chinese, Teochew and Korean choirs.

The five English choirs:

- Holy Spirit Choir (Sunday, 5.30pm)
- Salve Regina Choir (Saturday, 6.00pm)
- Seraphim Choir (Sunday, 11.15am)
- St Hilary's Choir (Sunday, 11.15am)
- St Thomas Aquinas Choir (Sunday, 9.30am)
