= Catholic education in Singapore =

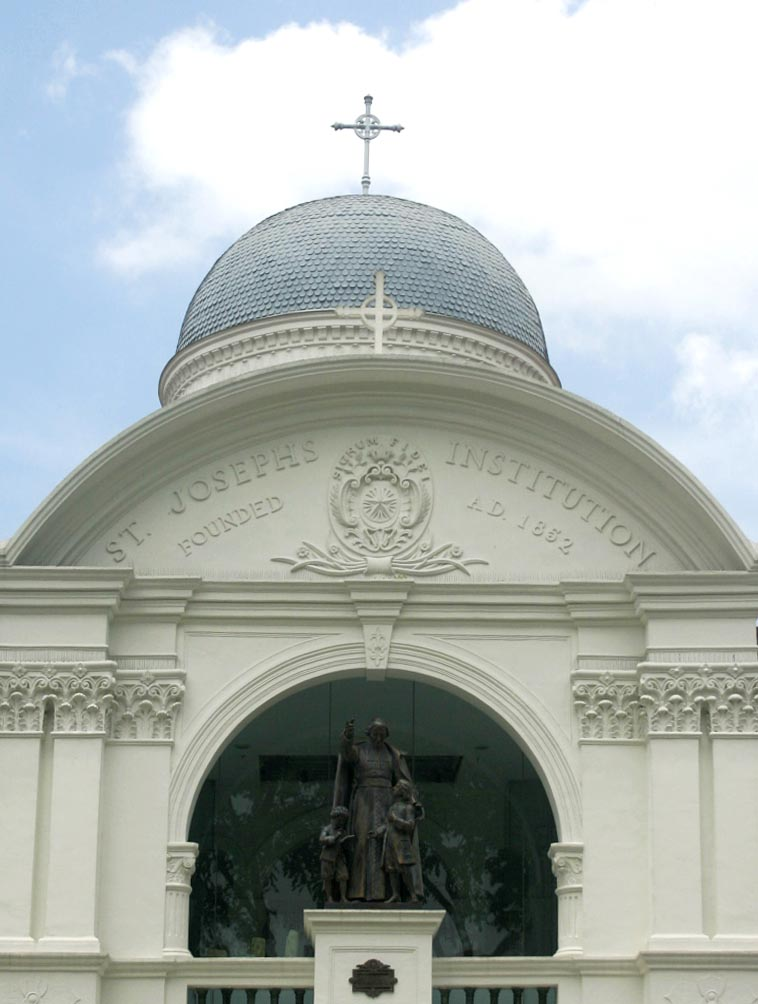
Building of the old St Joseph's Institution, Singapore's first Catholic school

The Catholic Church in Singapore has been extensively involved in the provision of education in Singapore. From the 19th century, the Catholic education system has grown to be the second biggest sector after government schools in Singapore, with more than 65 000 students. The Catholic Church has established kindergarten, primary, secondary and junior colleges educational institutions in Singapore.

== History ==
Roman Catholicism in Singapore has its roots from the Portuguese established Diocese of Malacca soon after Affonso de Albuquerque's conquest of Malacca in 1511. It is believed that there had been Portuguese missionaries operating out of Malacca in Singapore during the Portuguese period, 1511–1641, prior to the British conquest. Within a time span of several years, notable Catholic churches, such as the Cathedral of the Good Shepherd, were built. Missionary schools, notably Saint Joseph's Institution, were established and attended by Roman Catholics and non-Catholics (many of whom became converts).

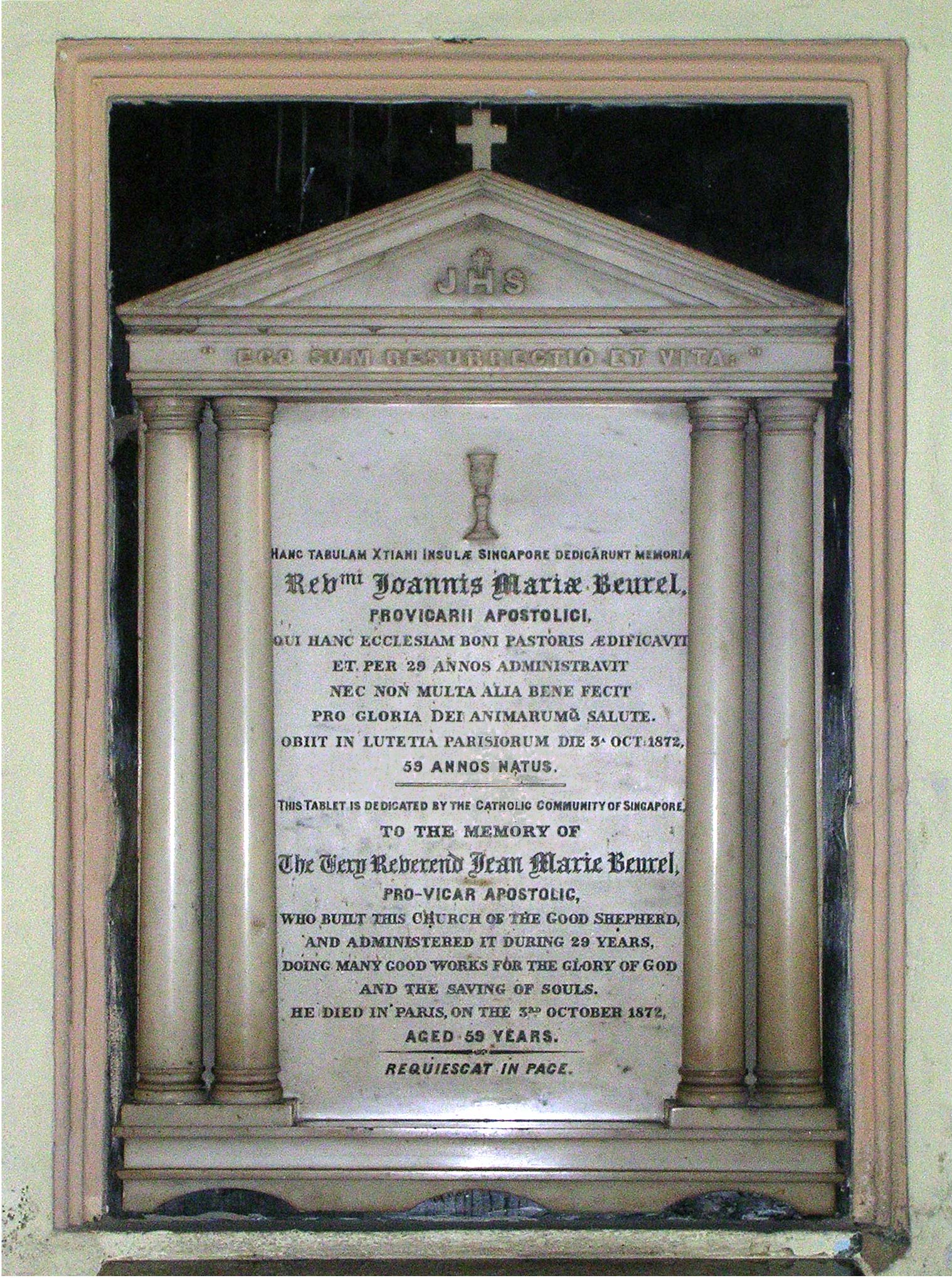
Memorial plaque to Father Jean-Marie Beurel who initiated the establishment of Catholic schools in Singapore

Saint John's Institution (now known as Saint Joseph's Institution), was founded in 1852 as an all-boys Catholic school and is the first missionary establishment of the La Salle Brothers in Asia. The endeavour was initiated by Rev Fr Jean-Marie Beurel MEP, who offered six Brothers from Europe to start the school using a former chapel as premises. The school was known as St John's, but on 19 March 1855 (Feast of Saint Joseph), the cornerstone of a new school building was laid. From that date, the school has been known as Saint Joseph's Institution. The new central classroom block was completed in 1865, though further expansion of the facilities continued well into the 20th Century. The school had 426 students in 1900. This grew to almost 1200 in 1914, and 1600 in 1922. With the student population expanding, a temporary branch school was opened, which eventually led to the building of a second school – Saint Patrick's School, Singapore – in 1933. During the Japanese Occupation, the school was renamed to Bras Basah Road Boys' School. The Brothers were soon asked to 'resign'. The school and hostel were run along military lines. However, 3 weeks after the Japanese surrender, the Brothers returned and St Joseph's was re-opened and normal lessons resumed.

Noting the absence of an all-rounded Catholic education for girls, three French and an Irish sister led by Mother St Mathilde Raclot established the Convent of the Holy Infant Jesus in 1854 at the corner of Bras Basah Road and Victoria Street (presently CHIJMES). Classes started at the school for fee paying students and orphans. The Convent of the Holy Infant Jesus was the second Catholic school and first all-girls Catholic school to be established in Singapore. Soon the number of pupils increased and the school became well known. In 1894, there were 167 pupils. Ten years later, the enrolment had increased to 300. Secondary education began in 1905. Under Mother Hombeline, the expansion programme continued.

Under the Montfort Brothers of St. Gabriel, seven institutions serving the youth of Singapore were founded, St. Gabriel's Secondary School, St. Gabriel's Primary School, Montfort Secondary School, Monfort Junior School, Assumption English School, Assumption Pathway School, and Boys Town. Much of the progress of the seven institutions can be attributed to the late Bro. Emmanuel, born Pierre Gaudette, who was dedicated to developing the institutions to give a quality of education that is unparalleled.

In a span of less than 100 years, more than 57 educational institutes from kindergarten to junior colleges were established in Singapore by Catholic missionaries from the La Salle Brothers, Sisters of the Holy Infant Jesus, Marist Brothers, and the Canossians.

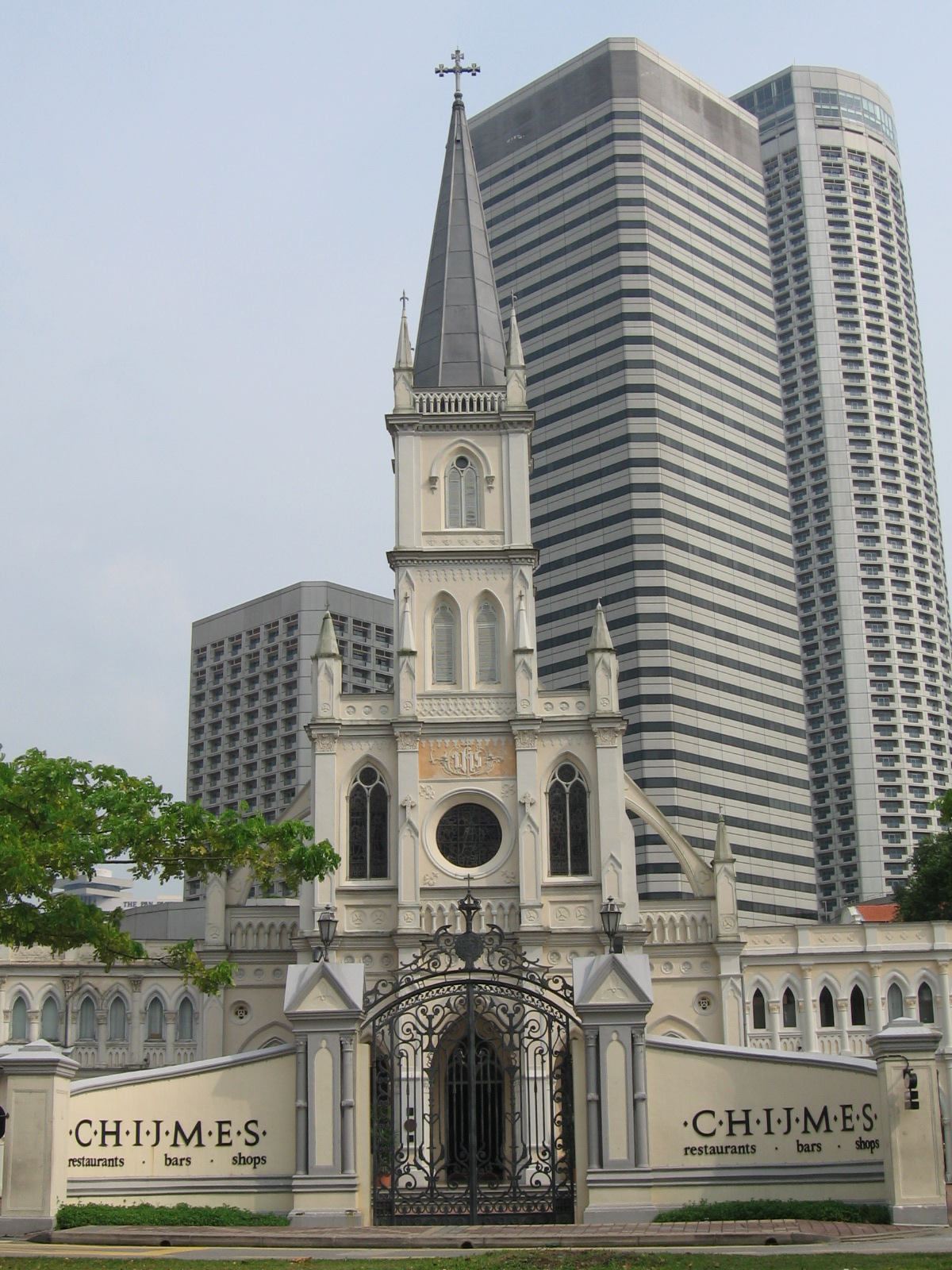
Building of CHIJMES, formerly the building of CHIJ, the second Catholic school in Singapore and the first all-girls Catholic school

== Administration and funding ==
In Singapore, most Catholic schools are funded partially by the Ministry of Education, making them government aided. Teachers teaching in government aided Catholic schools in Singapore are trained and posted by the National Institute of Education and the Ministry of Education. Basic essentials such as tables, chairs, computers and whiteboard are provided by the Ministry of Education while the construction of the school building or building maintenance are paid for by the school through the Archdiocese of Singapore. Students enrolled in government aided Catholic schools are also subsidised by the government. All Singaporean students enrolled in Catholic schools in Singapore are required to sing the national anthem and recite the pledge, similar to government schools. While Catholic schools must adhere to the broad requirements of Singapore's secular education system, they are free to provide a "Catholic" education ethos, which includes the Catholic social teachings.

== Prestige ==
St Joseph's Institution, Catholic High School and CHIJ St Nicholas Girls' School are regarded as a few of the most prestigious schools in Singapore. These schools have produced top GCE "O" Level Students more than once. The cut off point for entrance to these schools are consistently high, catering to elite students.

Catholic High has produced 20 president's Scholars and numerous recipients of other scholarships. Many of its alumni are leaders in the public and private sectors. Catholic High is recognized as one of the top schools in Singapore, having been ranked in the Band 1 tables of the Ministry of Education school academic rankings. In 2008 it was awarded the School Distinction Award under the MOE Master Plan of Awards, which recognizes high-achieving schools with exemplary processes and practices.

St Joseph's Institution is also consistently ranked among the top secondary schools in Singapore. In September 2005, the school was one of the few in Singapore to be awarded the coveted School Distinction Award as part of the Ministry of Education's 2005 Masterplan Awards. It has been awarded the Best Practice Award for teaching and learning. SJI has received the Sustained Achievement Award for Sports and the Sustained Achievement Award for Uniformed Groups for the third and seventh consecutive year respectively. In 2008, the school was re-validated with the Singapore Quality Class Award, obtained, for the second time, the Best Practice Award (Teaching and Learning) and attained the Best Practice Award (Student All-Round Development) in the MOE External Validation exercise. The school received consecutive Sustained Achievement Awards in Academic Value-Added, Sports, Uniformed Groups and Fitness. In 2009, SJI was recognized by MOE with a pinnacle award - The School of Excellence Award. The School Excellence Award (SEA) recognises schools for their excellence in both education processes and outcomes. It is the highest and most prestigious award in the Masterplan of Awards framework in MOE, Singapore.

CHIJ St Nicholas' Girls' School is also considered one of the premier educational institutes in Singapore, ranking third in the list of top secondary girls' schools, and among the top 10 secondary schools in Singapore. SNGS has produced the top student for the GCE O' levels for 4 years in a row ( 2008, 2009, 2010, 2011).

Maris Stella High School is also doing well, being ranked in Band 3 in the 2011 school achievement tables based on the 2011 O level results, and is considered to be one of the top 20 secondary schools in Singapore.

Other Catholic schools of considerable prestige and quality, include St. Gabriel's Secondary School, St. Patrick's School, and Montfort Secondary School, where new, innovative methods of learning are being introduced. Despite such groundbreaking development, an all rounded Catholic education remains at the forefront.

== Alumni ==
Since the establishment of Catholic schools in Singapore, many prominent public figures have attended Catholic schools in Singapore. These prominent figures include politicians, businessman, sportsman, entertainers, academics among other occupations. In recent years, alumni of Catholic schools include Prime Minister Lee Hsien Loong, Cabinet Minister Lim Swee Say, Supreme Court Judge, Chao Hick Tin and Actor Tay Ping Hui who graduated from Catholic High School. President Tony Tan, Deputy Prime Minister Teo Chee Hean, Former Cabinet Ministers, George Yeo and Mah Bow Tan and Entertainer Dick Lee who graduated from St Joseph's Institution. Alumnus from the Convent of the Holy Infant Jesus includes Actress Jacintha Abisheganaden and Ambassador Chan Heng Chee. Lee Yi Shyan, Minister of State for Manpower and National Development, graduated from Maris Stella High School. Several leaders of the Catholic Church in Singapore including Archbishop William Goh, are alumni of the seven institutions of the Montfort Brothers of St. Gabriel.

== List of Schools ==
Kindergartens | Primary | Secondary | Junior College | International | Vocational / Specialised Institutes

=== Kindergartens ===
Name	Area	Address	Website
Canossaville Preschool	Geylang	1 Sallim Road, Singapore 387621	
Canossian Convent Kindergarten	Bukit Batok	100 Jalan Merbok, Singapore 598454	
Catholic Kindergarten	Serangoon	15 Flower Road, Singapore 549404	
Church of the Holy Trinity Kindergarten	Tampines	20 Tampines Street 11, Singapore 529455	
Damien Centre Kindergarten	Queenstown	1 Commonwealth Drive, Singapore 149603	
Good Shepherd Convent Kindergarten	Marine Parade	25 Nallur Road, Singapore 456650	
Holy Family Kindergarten	Marine Parade	6 Chapel Road, Singapore 429509	
Maris Stella Kindergarten	Queenstown	49D Holland Road, Singapore 258852	
Marymount Kindergarten	Toa Payoh	9 Toa Payoh Lorong 8, Singapore 319253	
Nativity Church Kindergarten	Hougang	98 Hougang Avenue 8, Singapore 538791	
Our Lady Star of the Sea Childcare Centre	Yishun	235 Yishun Street 21 #01-440, Singapore 760235	
St Anne’s Church Kindergarten	Sengkang	66 Sengkang East Way, Singapore 548593	
St Anthony’s Childcare Centre	Woodlands	331 Woodlands Avenue 1 #01-421, Singapore 730331	
St Francis of Assisi Kindergarten (Boon Lay)	Boon Lay	200 Boon Lay Avenue, Singapore 649964	
St Francis of Assisi Kindergarten (Jurong West)	Jurong	47 Jurong West Street 42, Singapore 649368	
St Francis Xavier Kindergarten	Serangoon	63A Chartwell Drive Singapore 558758	
St Joseph’s Infant & Childcare Centre	Jurong	36 Jurong West Street 24, Singapore 648141	
St Joseph’s Church Childcare Centre	Bukit Timah	620 Upper Bukit Timah Road, Singapore 678116	
St Joseph’s Church Kindergarten	Bukit Timah	600 Upper Bukit Timah Road, Singapore 679331	
St Vincent De Paul Kindergarten	Serangoon	Blk 536 Serangoon North Ave 4 #01-187, Singapore 550536	

Kindergartens | Primary | Secondary | Junior College | International | Vocational / Specialised Institutes

=== Primary schools ===
<updated 20 July 2019>

Name	Gender	Area	Address	Website	Distinctive Programme
Canossa Catholic Primary School	co-ed	Geylang	1 Sallim Road S387621		
Catholic High School (Primary)	boys	Bishan	9 Bishan Street 22 S579767		SAP & GEP
CHIJ Katong Primary School	girls	Bedok	17 Martia Road S424821		
CHIJ Kellock	girls	Bukit Merah	1 Bukit Teresa Road S099757		
CHIJ Our Lady of Good Counsel	girls	Serangoon	2C Burghley Drive S558979		
CHIJ Our Lady of the Nativity	girls	Hougang	1257 Upper Serangoon Road S534793		
CHIJ Our Lady Queen of Peace	girls	Bukit Panjang	4 Chestnut Drive S679287		
CHIJ Primary (Toa Payoh)	girls	Toa Payoh	628 Lorong 1 Toa Payoh S319765		
CHIJ St Nicholas Girls’ School (Primary)	girls	Ang Mo Kio	501 Ang Mo Kio Street 13 S569405		SAP
De La Salle School	co-ed	Choa Chu Kang	11 Choa Chu Kang St 52 S689285		
Holy Innocents’ Primary School	co-ed	Hougang	5 Lorong Low Koon S536451		SAP
Maris Stella High School (Primary)	boys	Toa Payoh	25 Mount Vernon Road S368051		SAP
Marymount Convent School	girls	Toa Payoh	20 Marymount Road S297754		
Montfort Junior School	boys	Hougang	52 Hougang Avenue 8 S538786		

==== Primary One Registration ballot history ====
		Year 2019					
Name	Annual Intake (Vacancies)	Phase 2B	Phase 2C	Phase 2CS	Phase 3	Website	Distinctive Programme
Canossa Catholic Primary School	120						
Catholic High School (Primary)	240	< 1km	< 1km	not applicable	not applicable		SAP & GEP
CHIJ Katong Primary School	200						
CHIJ Kellock	200				not applicable		
CHIJ Our Lady of Good Counsel	150				not applicable		
CHIJ Our Lady of the Nativity	240		PR < 1km	not applicable	not applicable		
CHIJ Our Lady Queen of Peace	180			> 2km	not applicable		
CHIJ Primary (Toa Payoh)	210	1 - 2km	< 1km	not applicable	not applicable		
CHIJ St Nicholas Girls’ School (Primary)	210	< 1km	< 1km	not applicable	not applicable		SAP
De La Salle School	240		PR < 1km	not applicable	not applicable		
Holy Innocents’ Primary School	270	> 2km	< 1km	not applicable	not applicable		SAP
Maris Stella High School (Primary)	270		< 1km	not applicable	not applicable		SAP
Marymount Convent School	240						
Montfort Junior School	120						

If distance is indicated, it means Singapore Citizens residing within the specific distance from the school have to ballot for the specific Phase. Unless "PR" or Permanent Residents are indicated all data refers to Singapore Citizens. For more information on primary one registration visit this official website.

Kindergartens | Primary | Secondary | Junior College | International | Vocational / Specialised Institutes

=== Secondary schools ===
<updated 20 July 2019>

Name	Gender	Area	Address	Website	Academic Programme
Assumption English School	co-ed	Bukit Panjang	622 Upper Bukit Timah Road S678117		N(A), N(T), O
Catholic High School (Secondary)	boys	Bishan	9 Bishan Street 22 S579767		O, MUSIC, GEP, SAP & IP(A Level)
CHIJ Katong Convent	girls	Marine Parade	346 Marine Terrace S449150		N(A), N(T), O
CHIJ Secondary (Toa Payoh)	girls	Toa Payoh	622 Upper Bukit Timah Road S678117		O, ARTS, N(A), N(T)
CHIJ St Joseph’s Convent	girls	Sengkang	62 Sengkang East Way S548595		N(A), N(T), O
CHIJ St Nicholas Girls’ School	girls	Ang Mo Kio	501 Ang Mo Kio Street 13 S569405		O, MUSIC, SAP & IP(A Level)
CHIJ St Theresa’s Convent	girls	Bukit Merah	160 Lower Delta Road S099138		N(A), N(T), O
Hai Sing Catholic School	co-ed	Pasir Ris	9 Pasir Ris Drive 6 S519421		N(A), N(T), O
Holy Innocents’ High School	co-ed	Hougang	1191 Upper Serangoon Road S534786		N(A), N(T), O
Maris Stella High School	boys	Toa Payoh	25 Mount Vernon Road S368051		O, SAP
Montfort Secondary School	boys	Hougang	50 Hougang Avenue 8 S538785		N(A), N(T), O

Kindergartens | Primary | Secondary | Junior College | International | Vocational / Specialised Institutes

=== Junior colleges ===
- Catholic Junior College

=== Vocational/specialised Institutes ===
- Assumption Pathway School

== See also ==
- Archdiocese of Singapore
- List of Roman Catholic churches in Singapore
- Christianity in Singapore
- Ministry of Education, Singapore
- Jean-Marie Beurel
- Montfort Brothers of St. Gabriel
