= Deirdre O'Loan =

Irish nun and educator (1932–2016)

Sister Deirdre O'Loan

Principal of Catholic Junior College
- In office 1988–1994

Vice-principal of Catholic Junior College
- In office 1986–1987

Personal details
- Born: 16 November 1932 County Cork, Ireland
- Died: 13 August 2016 (aged 83) Singapore

Sister Cecilia Maria Deirdre O'Loan (16 November 1932 – 13 August 2016) was an Irish nun and educator who served as the principal of the Catholic Junior College and as the supervisor to the CHIJ schools in Singapore. She was the first Catholic nun to head a junior college in the country.

== Early life and education ==
O'Loan was born in northern County Cork, Ireland on 16 November 1932. Her father worked for the Department of Agriculture, Food and the Marine and her mother was a homemaker. She was the oldest of six siblings. She studied at the Convent of Mercy in Kanturk. Her father was then advising the Sisters of the Infant Jesus of Drishane Convent on agriculture, and she developed a positive impression of the institute after meeting some of its members. On her father's encouragement, she began attending the boarding and technical school there and developed a greater admiration for the sisters.

O'Loan successfully persuaded her parents to allow her to become a member of the institute when she was 18. She made her first profession in 1953 and her final vows in 1958. In this period, she learnt to speak French. She also studied at the University of Cork in this period, graduating in 1956 with a Bachelor of Arts (Honours) degree in Latin and English, and then in 1957 with a Diploma in Education after teaching in Dublin. She began attending the University of London in 1972, graduating the year after with a Postgraduate Diploma in Library and Information Studies.

== Career ==
From September 1957 to 1958, O'Loan taught at the Drishane Secondary School. She requested to be sent to East Asia as a missionary, but was instead asked to teach at the newly founded Scoil Iosa Malahide at Malahide, County Dublin. After this, Mother Charles DeLebarre informed her that she would be sent to Malaya as a missionary. She arrived in Kuala Lumpur in 1959, becoming a teacher at the Bukit Nanas Convent. O'Loan considered her time at Bukit Nanas to be the "happiest years of her life." She began teaching the school's A-level classes when they were introduced the year after, and volunteered with the Red Cross during the 13 May incident. With the introduction of Malayisation, she was forced to leave Malaysia in 1972. She was then asked to help set up the Catholic Junior College (CJC) in Singapore.

Upon arriving in Singapore in June 1974, O'Loan briefly taught English, Literature and General Paper at the CHIJ Katong Convent before being transferred to CJC as a General Paper teacher on its opening at the start of 1975. She became the head of the institute's English Department and was made vice-principal in 1986. She set up the school library. As a teacher, she was remembered by students as being approachable, warm and generous, yet stern, possessing an "austere veneer".

In December 1987, it was announced that O'Loan would succeed Brother Joseph Kiely, who was to be transferred to St. Joseph's Institution as deputy principal, as principal of CJC on the school's reopening in January. This made her the first Catholic nun in the country to head a junior college. Kiely was supportive of the appointment, opining that O'Loan was "eminently qualified with all the disposition for the job." As principal, she strongly emphasised the importance of character development, believing that "real scholarship requires a lot of qualities belonging to character information." She felt that the students of CJC were unfairly dismissed as "fun-loving, outgoing and rather frivolous" and "without a sense of responsibility."

O'Loan was conferred the Public Administration Medal (Bronze) at the 1992 National Day Awards. From 1992 to 1994, she chaired the Conference of Junior College Principals. O'Loan stepped down as principal in late 1994 and instead became the supervisor to the 11 CHIJ schools in the country. As supervisor, she advised the principals of CHIJ schools in "[upholding] the mission and motto" of their schools. She was known to regularly attend school events. In 2014, she was conferred the Public Service Star for her contributions to Singaporean education.

== Personal life and death ==
O'Loan was affectionately nicknamed "Sister D". She died of pancreatic cancer on 13 August 2016 at the CHIJ Convent on Chestnut Drive. The wake was held there two days after, while the funeral mass was held at the Saint Joseph's Church in Bukit Timah on 17 August.
