= TYS =

TYS can refer to:

- IATA code for McGhee Tyson Airport in Knoxville, Tennessee, USA
- Ten year series of Singaporean examination papers
- Television Yamaguchi Broadcasting Systems, Japan
- National Rail station code for Tyseley railway station in Birmingham, West Midlands, England
- Thank You Scientist, American progressive rock band
