= CHIJ Katong Convent =

- 加东修道院女校

Location
- 346 Marine Terrace; 449150; Singapore
- Coordinates: 1.3065°N 103.9152°E

Information
- Type: Government-aided; Autonomous
- Motto: Simple in Virtue, Steadfast in Duty
- Religious affiliation: Christianity (Catholic)
- Opened: 1930; 96 years ago
- Session: Single
- School code: 7008
- Principal: Tan Mei Chuen
- Gender: Female
- Colour: Black Red White Blue
- Website: www.chijkatongconvent.moe.edu.sg

CHIJ Katong Convent (CHIJ – KC) is a government-aided autonomous Catholic girls' secondary school in Marine Parade, Singapore.

The school is one of 11 Convent of the Holy Infant Jesus (CHIJ) schools in Singapore.

== History ==
In the 1920s, the Convent of the Holy Infant Jesus acquired one of the private bungalows on the eastern coast of Singapore as a weekend holiday bungalow for the nuns and boarders of the convent.

In 1930, these buildings were used as a private school and in 1932 the school was given a grant-in-aid status. The first set of students registered in January 1932 was mixed – 171 girls and 26 boys. Upon the completion of Saint Patrick's School in late 1932, the boys were transferred there. Katong Convent was no larger than a village school, consisting of four classes and a total enrolment of 197 students. Sister St Theodora was the first principal with a staff of only four teachers.

Under Sister St Vincent de Paul, the school building was extended in 1939 with eight new classrooms. In 1941, just before the outbreak of the war, there were 384 pupils – 60 in the secondary classes, 206 in the elementary and 118 in the primary. There were four nuns including the principal, and eight local teachers.

=== Japanese occupation ===
In 1941, during World War II, the staff and students practised air raid drills. Most parents kept their children at home when the school re-opened in January 1942 and their fears were confirmed, for in February 1942 Singapore fell to the Japanese. At the outbreak of war, the school building at Martia Road was taken over by the British and became a military centre and was subsequently used as an internment camp to house local Japanese civilians as prisoners-of-war.

School reopened in May 1942 and Katong Convent functioned at Saint Hilda's School in Ceylon Road under the name of Ceylon Road Girls' School. The attendance was 102. There were two sessions – the morning session for girls and the afternoon session for boys from Saint Patrick's.

=== Post-war years ===
After the war ended in August 1945, and when the school re-opened at Saint Hilda's in October 1945 there were 12 classes, and 430 students were re-registered for Primary 1 to Standard 5. Its old buildings briefly functioned as a tuberculosis hospital to cope with the post-war health crisis.

In January 1946, there were 483 students and in October, the numbers increased to 747. In October of the same year the school at Martia Road was restored and returned to the nuns. Prior to this, the building had been used by the British Military Administration as a rehabilitation centre for tuberculosis patients.

After the war, Sister Finbarr was appointed principal. The difficult task of re-organising the school, recruiting more staff, and bringing up academic standards fell on her shoulders.

In 1947, there were 17 classes with 755 students and in 1948, 18 classes with 688 students from Primary 1 to Standard 7. That year those who completed Standard 7 (i.e. Sec 2) had to complete two more years in the Convent at Victoria Street.

In 1949, a Standard 8 class was formed and in 1950, the school fielded its first Senior Cambridge candidates. In the same year, five new classrooms were built, opposite the oldest block and in 1951, part of this old building was renovated and converted into a Domestic Science classroom. After eight years of devoted service, Sister Finbarr was transferred to the Kuala Lumpur Convent and left in May 1954.

That year there were morning and afternoon sessions. The morning session comprised Primary 1 to Form 5 (Sec 4), with a total enrolment of 890. The afternoon session comprised Primary 1 to Form 3 (Sec 2) and a special class known as Form 4 Commercial, with an enrolment of 655. The students who made the grade were transferred to the morning session, and the less successful ones were placed in the commercial class.

In the following years, there was such an increase in the intake of students that it was necessary to build a branch school and for this purpose, the students and staff raised funds by running fun fairs and lotteries. In 1959, the building was completed and a few teachers from the Primary Staff were transferred to the new Convent at Opera Estate. Also in the same year, the school welcomed Sister Finbarr back and bade farewell to Sister Veronica.

The school continued to expand and it was again necessary to build a new wing. Again the staff and students worked to raise funds, this time at greater odds, because previously the Government had contributed half to any aided school extension scheme but now every cent was to be paid by the school. Undaunted, the school persevered, and in 1966, the new wing was completed. For the first time, the students had a proper tuckshop, library, sewing rooms and an Art room. Six new classrooms were included.

=== The seventies ===
In 1971, Sister Finbarr retired. A senior member of the staff, Marie Bong was appointed headmistress in her place. Under her leadership, the school became known for choral speaking, creative writing and Shakespearean productions.

=== The eighties ===
In 1982, plans were afoot to upgrade the facilities of the school. The offer by the Ministry of Education of a piece of land at Marine Parade in exchange for the site of Opera Estate Convent enabled the secondary school to move to a new premise, whilst the primary school was merged with Opera Estate Convent and remained at the original location at Martia Road. The building was also renovated later.

After many months of planning and fund-raising, at the end of 1986, the school moved into its new building with Karen Oei at the helm. With a modern school premises and a bold outlook for the future, Katong Convent continued to flourish, with its students excelling academically, in the arts and in sports.

=== The nineties ===
In 1990, the Primary section returned to the former site at Martia Road and Katong Convent became a single session secondary school. The beginning of school ranking exercises in 1994 saw Katong Convent perform well in the tables. Katong Convent was particularly outstanding in the Value-added rankings claiming top spots for both Express and Normal stream. In 1999, the school won the Sustained Achievement Award – Academic Value-Added, for having provided value-added education to both the Express and Normal Academic students for at least ten consecutive years (1996–2006).

=== 2000 and beyond ===
Katong Convent celebrated its 70th anniversary in the year 2000. With it soon came the autonomy status which was granted by the Ministry of Education. It also celebrated its 80th anniversary in the year 2010. At the conclusion of the 2014 academic year, the school moved to a holding site in Geylang Bahru as the Marine Parade campus has undergone a two-year renovation programme under PRIME. The school received the School Distinction Award which recognises high-achieving schools with exemplary school processes and practices in 2016.

== School identity and culture ==
=== School crest ===
The school badge which IJ girls wear on their uniforms is the badge of IJ schools all over the world.

The red shield has a silver band edged in gold. On the right is the Book of the Gospels with a silver rosary, on the left a golden distaff and spindle. The shield, surmounted by a gold cross is encircled by a garland of marguerites. The motto on the badge in English is: 'Simple in Virtue – Steadfast in Duty.'

The Rosary of the Virgin Mary symbolises communication with God. The distaff and spindle are symbols of womanly labour. The Garland of Marguerites speaks of simplicity, seen as the most charming trait in young girlhood.

=== School culture ===
Katong Convent is known to celebrate the arts. Book and Music Week (BMW) is an annual arts tradition that has been held for generations. The programme forges identity within each KC girl and builds rapport within a class and across other classes and levels. The event encourages individuals to step out of their bubble and express their artistic sides through the different performing arts.

== Affiliation ==
CHIJ Katong Convent is affiliated to:

- CHIJ (Katong) Primary
- Catholic Junior College

== Notable alumni ==
=== Politics ===
- Fatimah Lateef: Former member of Parliament
- Jeannette Chong-Aruldoss: lawyer; Secretary-General, National Solidarity Party, 2013–2015
- Nadia Ahmad Samdin: Member of Parliament for Ang Mo Kio GRC
- Nicole Seah: Former Politician and Workers Party Member

=== Government ===
- Chan Heng Chee: Ambassador to the United States of America

=== Corporate ===
- Noeleen Heyzer: executive director, UNIFEM; nominee for Nobel Peace Prize, 2005

=== Sports ===
- Dinah Chan: national cyclist
- Janet Jesudason: Olympic sprinter
- Shanti Pereira: national sprinter

=== Entertainment and arts ===
- Georgina Chang: programme director, 98.7 FM
- Glenda Chong: news presenter, Mediacorp; Best News Anchor, Asian Television Awards, 2001
- Andrea De Cruz: actress and television presenter
- Suchen Christine Lim: writer
- Michelle Saram: former actress and model; First and only Singaporean to have appeared in Singapore, Taiwan and Hong Kong television drama; entrepreneur
- Elizabeth Tan: actress
- Teresa Tseng: singer; runner-up, Campus Superstar (Season 1)
- Pooja Nansi: poet, musician and educator

== See also ==
- CHIJMES
- Convent of the Holy Infant Jesus
