= Finian Tan =

Venture capitalist

Dr. Finian Tan
- Education: Singapore Polytechnic; University of Glasgow; University of Cambridge
- Occupations: Venture capitalist, entrepreneur
- Children: 4

Finian Tan is a venture capitalist and entrepreneur. He is currently the chairman of Vickers Venture Partners, an international venture capital firm with a presence in Singapore, Shanghai, New York, Hong Kong, San Diego, San Francisco and Kuala Lumpur. Prior to co-founding Vickers Venture Partners, Tan was partner and managing director of Silicon Valley venture capital firm, Draper Fisher Jurvetson Eplanet, where he made an early investment in Chinese tech giant Baidu. Some of Tan's other notable investments include out-of-home media company Focus Media, the Asian Food Channel, and life science company Samumed.

== Career ==
Tan worked at Goldman Sachs, where he started as a Vice-President at J.Aron and Co (Singapore) Pte and was eventually the Regional Director and Head of J.Aron and Co (Singapore) Pte. in charge of the Asia-Pacific Region. Tan worked for Shell Eastern Petroleum Ltd in Singapore and as Chief Trader at Shell Japan Ltd. Tan was a Founding Partner and managing director at Draper Fisher Jurvetson ePlanet's ("DFJ ePlanet") Asian operations. Tan was managing director and head of the Credit Suisse First Boston ("CSFB") group of banks in Singapore and Malaysia.

Tan founded Vickers in 2005 and is the Chairman of the investment committee for Fund V (the "Investment Committee"). He is currently actively serving on the boards of Matchmove as chairman (NAV at 9.8x entry price for Fund III) and Mainspring (NAV at 3.8x entry price for Fund IV). Tan was managing director and head of the Credit Suisse First Boston ("CSFB") group of banks in Singapore and Malaysia.

=== Other activities ===
Tan previously served as chairman or board member for United Eagle Airlines (China), Sunfun Info Co Ltd (China) listed in Taiwan, Media Development Authority of Singapore (Singapore, Chairman Audit Committee and Investment Committee), Singapore Polytechnic (also on Exco), Singapore Government Parliamentary Committee for Trade and Industry Resource Panel, Defence Science and Technology Agency (Singapore), SMA (Singapore-MIT) Governing Board, Singapore National Computer Board, The National University of Singapore (also member of the investment committee), Tuas Power Pte. Ltd (Singapore), Sentosa Cove Pte. Ltd. (Singapore), Majulah Connection (Singapore), the Singapore Venture Capital Association, the Singapore-Shandong Business Council and the first chairman of the Sentosa Cove Owners’ Council.

Tan served was Deputy Secretary of the Ministry of Trade and Industry, and later as Chairman of the TIF fund. In 1997, he was a member of the Economic Review Committee of Singapore and in 2002, he was part of the working group of the Economic Review Committee of Singapore.

Tan served as Deputy Chairman of the National Science and Technology Board in Singapore and was on the boards of the Life Sciences Investment Pte. Ltd. (Singapore), and the National Cancer Centre (Singapore).
