= Holy Innocents' High School =

- 圣婴中学; Sekolah Tinggi Holy Innocent

Location
- 1191 Upper Serangoon Road; Hougang, 534786; Singapore; 1°22′18.99″N 103°53′44.65″E

Information
- Type: Government-aided; Co-educational
- Motto: 以自豪和奉献精神服务 (To serve with pride and dedication)
- Religious affiliation: Christianity (Catholic)
- Established: 1892; 134 years ago
- Session: Single Session
- School code: 7108
- Principal: Chew-Ng Pek Yum Rebecca
- Enrolment: approx. 1,200
- Colour: Blue White Yellow
- Website: holyinnocentshigh.moe.edu.sg

Holy Innocents' High School (HIHS) (Simplified Chinese:圣婴中学, Traditional Chinese: 聖嬰中學, pinyin: Shèngyīng Zhōngxué) is a Catholic school in Hougang, Singapore. Founded in 1892, the school offers secondary school education leading up to a Singapore-Cambridge GCE Ordinary Level examination, in both the Express and Normal (Academic) streams, as well as Singapore-Cambridge GCE Normal Level in the Normal (Academic) and Normal (Technical) streams.

== History ==
The HIHS stone, first blessed on January 5, 1958

=== Tao Nan School (1892–1957) ===
Holy Innocents' High School was founded as Tao Nan School in 1892, as one of the first Chinese Mission Schools in Singapore. Bible studies and classical Chinese were taught. In 1920, the name of the school was changed from Tao Nan to Holy Innocents' Boy School. It means pure, wholesome and innocent. Between 1942 and 1945, Holy Innocents' Boys School was administered by the Japanese as Syonan School. In 1957, a two-storey building consisting of 12 classrooms was built at 7.25 miles off Upper Serangoon Road.

=== Foundation (1958–1984) ===
Secondary classes were started in 1958 and the school was renamed Holy Innocents' High School. The new campus was declared open on 5 January 1958, with blessing by Archbishop Michel Olçomendy. Between 1960 and 1964, eight additional classrooms and two laboratories were built. Pre-University classes were introduced in 1965, and the school was further expanded in 1968 with an addition of three-storey building. On 9 September 1983, Mr Ho Kah Leong, Parliamentary Secretary, Ministry of Education, officiated the opening of the Auditorium and four classrooms.

=== Modernisation (1985–2000) ===
On 23 March 1985, the primary school section of Holy Innocents' High School was separated from the high school section as Holy Innocents' Primary School and moved to new premises at Lorong Low Koon. The secondary section functioned as a single-session high school. In 1987, a School Building Committee was formed headed by then Chairman of the School Management Board, Rev Fr Mathias Tung, to expand the school to a standard-sized secondary school. Approval was given by the government with an 80% capital grant.

Expansion and refurbishment works commenced in May 1992. The school's lower secondary classes shared premises with Hai Sing High School (present Hai Sing Catholic School) while the upper secondary classes reminded at the present site. The official commissioning of the upgraded facilities was officially commissioned on 30 July 1994 by Gregory Yong, Archbishop of Singapore, The completed project added three new teaching blocks and an administrative block to the original building. The total built-in area was 9000 sq m.

=== Present (2001–present) ===
In June 2004, the HIHS moved to holding school at 51 Edgedale Plains, which is the site of the present day Greendale Secondary School. The school moved back in December 2005. On 2 June 2006, the upgraded campus was opened and blessed by Archbishop Nicholas Chia, head of the Catholic Church, Archdiocese of Singapore. The upgraded campus featured an air-conditioned hall, a chapel, an alumni room, two theatres, and a roof garden. In 2008, HIHS celebrated its 50th anniversary as a high school with a musical titled 'I Want to Be A Star!' In 2013, HIHS attained niche status for its journalism and broadcasting programme. The journalism and broadcasting programme was designated as the school's Applied Learning Programme in 2014. The school has also designated its leadership and service learning programmes as the school's Learning for Life Programme in 2015. The school completed the building of its Indoor Sports Hall in 2017, along with the setting up of an eco-garden and other green areas over the years. HIHS celebrated the 125th anniversary of the establishment of the Holy Innocents' school in 2017, with the setting up of a time capsule and a newly designed heritage gallery in 2017. In 2021, The school has decided to supply its students with ipads for learning. The school said that it was an "exciting milestone" for their students to adopt new ways of learning.

== Principal ==
Name of Principal	Years served
Rev Fr Becheras	1920 - 1957
Rev Fr Shih	1957 - 1969
Rev Fr Peter Lu	1970 - 1984
Mr Lee Tho Nee	1984 - 1996
Mrs Mary Bay	1996 - 2001
Mrs Pauline Wong	2001 - 2007
Ms Soh Lai Leng	2008 - 2013
Mr Yap Wai Meng	2014 – 2018
Mrs Chew Rebecca	2019 – present

== School identity and culture ==
The main classroom block

=== Motto ===
The school motto, 谦诚、和爱, conveys the Chinese traditional values of Sincerity and Compassion.

=== Good Samaritans ===
Holy Innocents' High School believes in nurturing its students as Good Samaritans in the community. In 2014, a group of students was reportedly lauded by members of the public removing debris from the middle of a busy road. The news story was carried on national broadsheet, The Straits Times. In 2012, a Secondary 4 girl shaved her waist-length hair and raised $1000 for cancer-stricken children.

The school holds a Thanksgiving Mass to give thanks for the academic year towards the end of the year, as well as a Commencement Mass at the start of the academic year to seek for God's blessings over the school.

== Affiliations ==
Holy Innocents' High School is affiliated with Holy Innocents' Primary School and Catholic Junior College.

== Academic information ==
=== O Level Express Course ===
The Express Course is a nationwide four-year programme that leads up to the Singapore-Cambridge GCE Ordinary Level examination.

==== Academic subjects ====
The examinable academic subjects for Singapore-Cambridge GCE Ordinary Level offered by Holy Innocents' High School for upper secondary level (via. streaming in secondary 2 level), as of 2017, are listed below.

Notes:

1. Subjects indicated with ' * ' are mandatory subjects.
2. All students in Singapore are required to undertake a Mother Tongue Language as an examinable subject, as indicated by ' ^ '.
3. "SPA" in Pure Science subjects refers to the incorporation of School-based Science Practical Assessment, which 20% of the subject result in the national examination are determined by school-based practical examinations, supervised by the Singapore Examinations and Assessment Board. The SPA Assessment has been replaced by one Practical Assessment in the 2018 O Levels.

Sciences	Language & Hunanities	Arts & Aesthetics
Additional Mathematics*; Mathematics*; Physics (SPA); Chemistry (SPA)*; Biology (SPA); Science (Combined); Computing	English Language*; English Literature; Mother Tongue Language* ^; Higher Mother Tongue Language; Geography; History; Combined Humanities (Social Studies & another Humanities subject at elective level)*; Principles of Accounts	Art; Design & Technology; Food & Nutrition; Music

=== Normal Course ===
The Normal Course is a nationwide 4-year programme leading to the Singapore-Cambridge GCE Normal Level examination, which runs either the Normal (Academic) curriculum or Normal (Technical) curriculum, abbreviated as N(A) and N(T) respectively.

==== Normal (Academic) Course ====
In the Normal (Academic) course, students offer 6 subjects in the Singapore-Cambridge GCE Normal Level examination. Compulsory subjects include:

- English Language
- Mother Tongue Language
- Mathematics
- Combined Humanities
- Combined Sciences

A 5th year leading to the Singapore-Cambridge GCE Ordinary Level examination is available to N(A) students who perform well in their Singapore-Cambridge GCE Normal Level examination. Students can move from one course to another based on their performance and the assessment of the school principal and teachers. Students who do well in the N Level exams can also apply for the Polytechnic Foundation Programme (PFP), or the ITE Direct Entry Scheme to Higher Nitec (DPP), which allows students to gain admission to relevant polytechnic diploma courses after the Higher Nitec course, subject to passing criteria.

==== Normal (Technical) Course ====
The Normal (Technical) course prepares students for a technical-vocational education at the Institute of Technical Education. Students will offer 6 subjects in the Singapore-Cambridge GCE Normal Level examination. The curriculum is tailored towards strengthening students’ proficiency in English and Mathematics. Students take English Language, Mathematics, Basic Mother Tongue and Computer Applications as compulsory subjects.

=== Advanced Elective Modules ===
Holy Innocents’ High School offers Advanced Elective Modules (AEMs) from 2007. The school collaborates Nanyang Polytechnic (NYP) to offer elective modules to expand the learning experience of pupils and provide exposure to the practice-oriented learning approaches adopted in the polytechnics.

AEMs may be used for polytechnic admission under the Joint Polytechnic Special Admissions Exercise (JPSAE) and the Direct Polytechnic Admission (DPA) exercise. They may also be used for credit exemption in subjects that are relevant to the pupil's subsequent course of study in the Polytechnic.

=== Elective Modules ===
The school offers students in the Normal (Academic) and Normal (Technical) streams the opportunity to take up Elective Modules over their upper secondary years. These Elective Modules are hands-on and creative subjects offered in collaboration with the ITE or other vendors, to expose students to subjects beyond their academic subjects.

== Programmes ==
=== Care Representatives ===
In each class, care representatives are appointed to watch out for classmates who might be emotionally stressed, anxious or disturbed. The school also encourages care representatives to serve as mediators when needed.

== Relations with other schools ==
Holy Innocents' High School partners with Temasek Polytechnic and Nanyang Polytechnic to offer Advanced Elective Modules.

== Awards and Accolades ==
Head of Department Ms Goh Lay Ching received a Commendation Medal (Pingat Kepujian) at the National Day Awards 2018.

Seven teams from Holy Innocents' High School received top prizes at the ignITE Science & Technology Challenge 2015, an annual science challenge jointly organised by the Institute of Technical Education (ITE), the Ministry of Education (MOE) and Science Centre Singapore.

== Alumni ==
The alumni of HIHS play an important role in supporting school initiatives, as well as students who are deserving of financial aid. As HIHS used to be a boys' school all the way until 1985, most of the alumni are 'old boys'. The alumni association then changed its name Holy Innocents' Old Students' Association (HIOSA) to reflect the change of HIHS being a co-ed school. Anyone who has attended Holy Innocents' High School, Holy Innocents' Primary School and Holy Innocents' Girls' School is eligible to join HIOSA.

=== Notable alumni ===
- Lisa Marie White: Miss Universe Singapore 2015
- Chew Chor Meng: Actor, Mediacorp
- Edwin Goh: Actor, Mediacorp
- Lee Li Lian: former Member of Parliament, Punggol East SMC
- Pierre Png: Actor, Mediacorp

== Gallery ==
The Hornet Scouts of HIHS.

The Holy Innocents' Military Band (HIMB).

Assembly grounds

The school celebrated its 50th year in its current location at Hougang in 2008

Habits of Minds Programme
