= Catholic Junior College =

Junior College in Singapore

Location
- 129 Whitley Road; Singapore 297822; Singapore; 1°21′17″N 103°50′41″E

Information
- Type: Government-aided; Co-educational
- Motto: In Veritate et Caritate (In Truth and Love)
- Religious affiliation: Christianity (Catholic)
- Established: January 1975; 51 years ago
- Session: Single-session
- School code: 0802
- Principal: Woo Soo Min
- Enrolment: Approx. 1,400
- Campus size: 7 hectares (17 acres)
- Colour: Blue White Gold
- Mission: Building a Generation In Truth & Love: Every CJCian to be a Thinker with a Mission, Leader with a Heart
- Vision: CJC - A Place of Excellence in Learning and Living
- Website: cjc.moe.edu.sg

Catholic Junior College (CJC) is a junior college in Singapore, offering a two-year course for pre-university students leading to the Singapore-Cambridge GCE Advanced Level examination. Founded in 1975, it was the third junior college to be established in Singapore.

== History ==
Plans for a junior college operated by the Catholic mission was first announced by Prime Minister Lee Kuan Yew at the opening of National Junior College in May 1970, as one of several planned to be set up. Subsequently, the Catholic mission disclosed plans for a fund-raising campaign in June 1970. The college was to occupy about 15 acres (6.1 ha) of land along Whitley Road, and to use both English and Chinese to conduct classes.

Construction on the college campus was underway by July 1974, and was expected to have a capacity of 1,500 students. CJC took in its first batch of 500 students in January 1975, but as the college campus was not ready, the students initially attended classes at other Catholic schools. The first section of the college, comprising four tutorial blocks, was completed in March 1975, while the rest of the campus was completed by August that year. With the college's opening, pre-university students that were then attending classes in Catholic schools moved over to the college.

In March 1977, the college set up a co-operative. In the late 1970s, CJC formulated its own moral education syllabus designed specifically for its students. Consisting of role-playing and sharing sessions, it took into account ideas from students shared during engagement sessions. In 1985, the college campus was upgraded at a cost of $1 million.

On 16 January 2026, the Ministry of Education announced that the college would be shifting its campus to the Punggol Digital District in 2034. The move aims to allow the school better links with digital trends, as well as greater community contributions.

== Principal ==
Name of Principal	Years served
Patrick Loh	1975 - 1978
Joseph Kiely, FSC	1979 - 1987
Deirdre O'Loan, IJ	1988 - 1994
Maria Lau, IJ	1995 - 2001
Paul A Rogers,, FSC	2002 - 2009
Christine Anne Kong	2010 - 2016
Phyllis Lim	2017 - 2023
Woo Soo Min	2023 -

== School identity and culture ==
=== Crest ===
Former crest of Catholic Junior College.

Current crest of Catholic Junior College.

The principal symbol of CJC is the Holy Spirit or Paraclete. The school crest was redesigned and unveiled in 2013.

=== Motto ===
The CJC's motto is "In Veritate et Caritate", which translates as "In Truth and Love".

=== Uniform & Attire ===
CJC's uniform is themed in a light shade of blue. The uniform was designed by the first batch of students. Male students wear plain light blue shirts with light blue pants while female students wear light blue blouses with light blue skirts. A collar pin bearing the flame insignia of the College is worn on the left collar of the uniform. Navy blue blazers and ties are worn during important ceremonies and events.

== Admission and affiliation ==
Catholic Junior College is affiliated to all Catholic schools in Singapore that offer secondary education.

- Assumption English School
- Catholic High School
- CHIJ Secondary (Toa Payoh)
- CHIJ Katong Convent
- CHIJ St Joseph's Convent
- CHIJ St Nicholas Girls' School
- CHIJ St Theresa's Convent
- Hai Sing Catholic School
- Holy Innocents' High School
- Maris Stella High School
- Montfort Secondary School
- St Anthony's Canossian Secondary
- St Gabriel's Secondary School
- St Joseph's Institution
- St Patrick's School

Students from the affiliated institutions are entitled to two additional point reduction to their L1R5 raw scores for their GCE Ordinary Level examination results when applying for admission into CJC as the first choice (a maximum of 4 reduction points to L1R5 score is allowed for JC Joint Admission Exercise, with the exception for appeals through Language Elective Programmes to participating pre-university centres, which allows up to a maximum of 6 reduction points).

== Campus ==
Catholic Junior College is located off Whitley Road, and was built on a site previously occupied by the British forces.

== Notable alumni ==
=== Politics and government ===
- Cheryl Chan, former Member of Parliament
- Joan Pereira, Member of Parliament for Tanjong Pagar GRC
- David Hoe, Member of Parliament for Jurong East Bukit Batok GRC

=== Education ===
- Tan Chorh Chuan, President, National University of Singapore

=== Arts ===
- Christine Tan, CNBC anchor
- Tay Ping Hui, actor and director

== See also ==
- Education in Singapore
