= Montfort Brothers of St. Gabriel =

French religious institute

- The device of the order Ave Maria Deo soli
- Abbreviation: SG/F.S.G.
- Formation: c. AD 1711; 315 years ago
- Founder: Louis de Montfort
- Type: Catholic religious order
- Headquarters: France
- Website: stgabrielinst.org

The Montfort Brothers of St. Gabriel (SG), otherwise Gabrielite Brothers or Frères de Saint-Gabriel (FSG), is a religious institute of the Catholic Church. Its roots go back to Louis de Montfort, who opened a few schools for poor children in La Rochelle, France, in about 1711.

== History ==
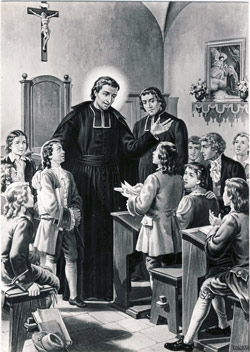
De Montfort accompanied by one of the brothers

As Louis de Montfort traveled about giving missions, he was often accompanied by brothers, whom he called to assist in his work. During the eighteenth century the life of the Community of the Holy Spirit (the Company of Mary) was centered at Saint-Laurent, where there were about fifty priests and thirty-five brothers. Of 276 missions preached from 1749 to 1799, one or two Brothers participated in 250 of them with the missionaries.

=== Brothers of Christian Instruction of the Holy Spirit ===
After the French Revolution, the congregation amalgamated under the guidance of Father Gabriel Deshayes into the Brothers they are today. Around 1824 the Brothers received official approbation under the name of Brothers of Christian Instruction of the Holy Spirit. A motherhouse, called "Saint Gabriel" was established for them separate from that of the priests. In 1853 the imperial decree of Napoleon III conferred on the Congregation the title of Brothers of Christian Instruction of Saint Gabriel.

The institute's main concern is Christian education, especially for the poor, orphans and the physically challenged. Other organizations inspired by Montfortian ideals are the Company of Mary and the Daughters of Wisdom. The 'Associates' are a lay association linked to the Gabrielites and similarly inspired by Montfortian spirituality.

One institution run by FSG is Assumption University (better known as ABAC, from its former name of Assumption Business Administration College), which was the first university in Thailand to offer all classes in the English language. They have also established educational institutions in Canada, Singapore, Malaysia, India, Mauritius, Spain, Italy and France.
