= Programme for Rebuilding and Improving Existing Schools =

Programme of the Singapore Ministry of Education

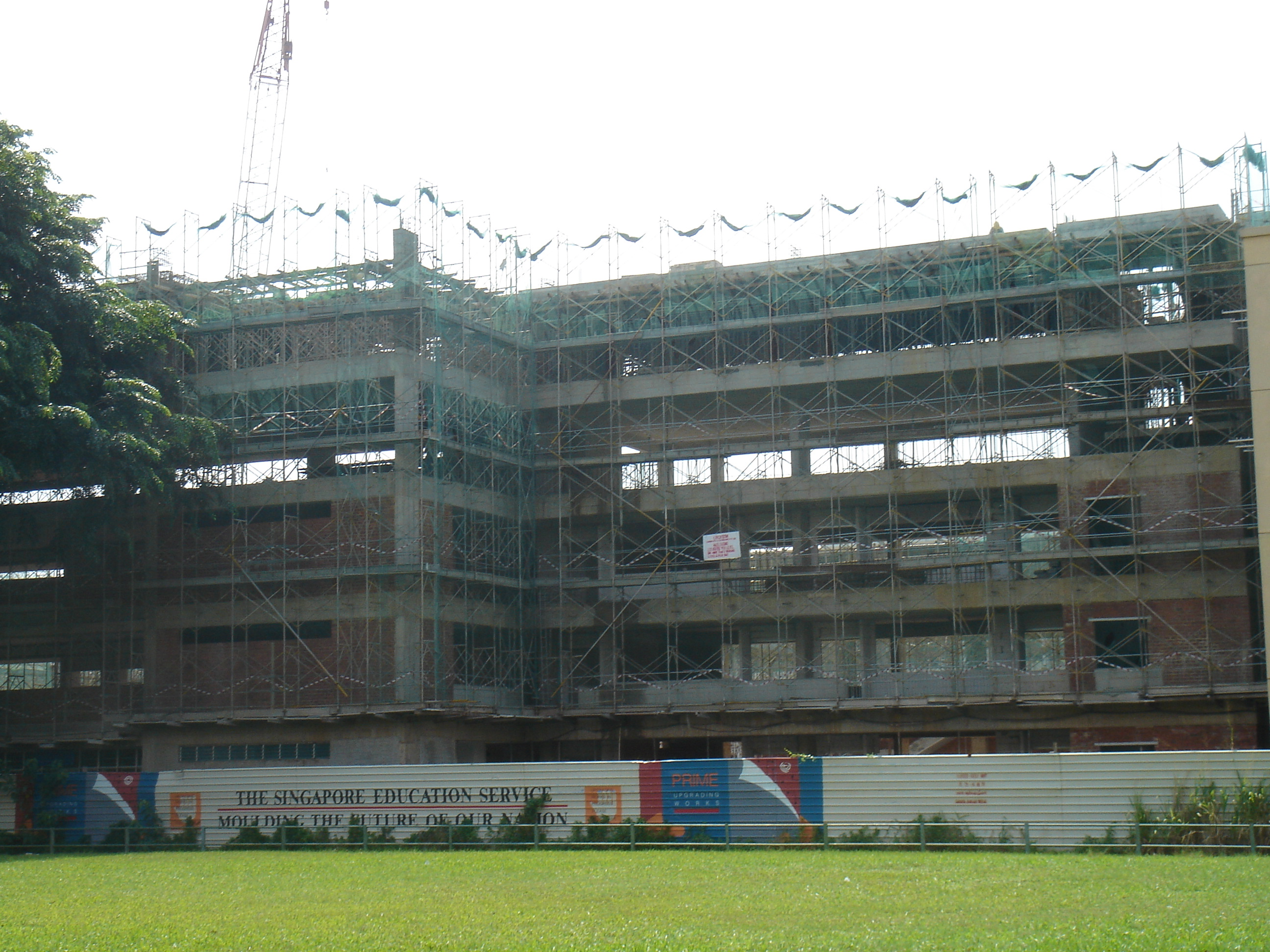
A school building at Aljunied, being constructed under PRIME.

Programme for Rebuilding and IMproving Existing schools (PRIME) is a programme initiated by the Ministry of Education in 1999 to upgrade and rebuild school buildings in Singapore.

== Flexible School Infrastructure (FlexSI) ==
Under this framework, school infrastructure is made more flexible to support teaching approaches that better engage students, thus giving schools more room to innovate in teaching and learning.

For example, the schools could have modular classrooms that can be opened up for larger group lectures, or partitioned for smaller group discussions; special-purpose rooms could be designed such that multiple usage of such rooms can be made possible; common areas such as corridors and study areas could be designed such that they can be expanded learning spaces.

== Implementation ==
=== Phasing ===
Launched in May 1999, PRIME was estimated to cost S$4.5 billion and is implemented in phases. As of September 2007, 243 schools have been included in the earlier nine phases of PRIME. Of these, 207 schools have completed their upgrading.

=== On-site rebuilding and upgrading ===
Where feasible, a school will remain on-site while construction work is carried out for either upgrading or rebuilding. All construction works must be carried out outside school hours, such as between 7:00pm and 7:00am. It also has to consider noise levels between 10:30pm and 7:00am, since most of the schools are located in or around residential areas.

Otherwise it will move to a temporary holding site, known as filler school, while upgrading or rebuilding is carried out at its present site.

=== Relocation ===
Where a vacant site is available, the new school will be built on this site. The school will relocate to the new site once the school building is ready.

=== Mergers ===
To optimise the use of resources, schools may merge and be relocated. Such merger of schools may sometimes allow for a greater exchange of expertise and policies to provide a higher quality of education, as was the case of the merger of Ang Mo Kio North Primary School, Li Hua Primary School and Hong Dao Primary School. The three schools merged in January 2000 to be known as Anderson Primary School and was successfully validated through an External Validation, just one year after the merger, under the School Excellence Model.
