= Singapore Examinations and Assessment Board =

Statutory board under the Ministry of Education of the Government of Singapore

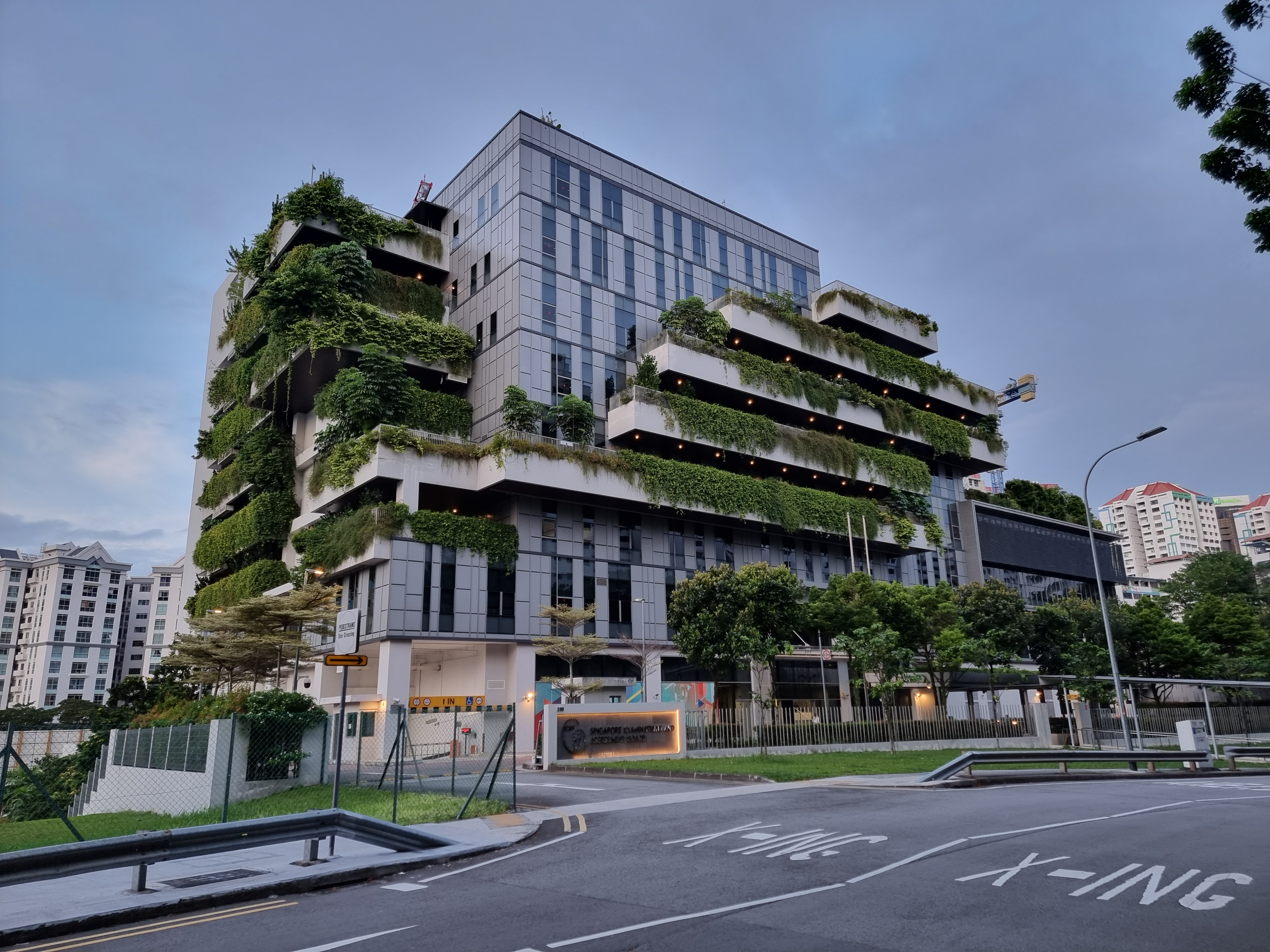
- Headquarters of the Singapore Examinations and Assessment Board

Agency overview
- Formed: 1 April 2004; 22 years ago
- Jurisdiction: Government of Singapore
- Headquarters: 298 Jalan Bukit Ho Swee, Singapore 169565
- Agency executives: Wong Siew Hoong, Chairman; Yue Lip Sin, Chief Executive
- Parent agency: Ministry of Education
- Website: www.seab.gov.sg
- Agency ID: T08GB0051K

The Singapore Examinations and Assessment Board (SEAB) is a statutory board under the Ministry of Education of the Government of Singapore. It was established on 1 April 2004 to oversee national-based examinations in Singapore, including the provisions of examinations and assessment services and the publishing of major examination results such as the Primary School Leaving Examination (PSLE), GCE 'NA' and 'NT' Level, GCE 'O' Level and GCE 'A' Level.

== Regulated examinations ==
The following national examinations are regulated by the Singapore Examinations and Assessment Board.

Name	Level	Examination period	Result period	Remarks
Primary School Leaving Examination (PSLE)	Primary 6	August–October of current year	November of current year	Also offers International Primary School Examination (iPSLE) for international students.
Singapore-Cambridge GCE Normal Level (GCE NA-Level OR GCE NT-Level)	Secondary 4 Normal Academic or Technical stream	July–October of current year	December of current year	Offers either the Technical or Academic level depending on stream. Final examination year will be in 2026 as the national examination will be replaced by Singapore-Cambridge Secondary Education Certificate (SEC) in 2027.
Singapore-Cambridge GCE Ordinary Level (GCE O-Level)	Secondary 4 Express stream/Secondary 5 Normal Academic stream	May–November of current year	January of succeeding year	Final examination year will be in 2026 as the national examination will be replaced by Singapore-Cambridge Secondary Education Certificate (SEC) in 2027.
Singapore-Cambridge GCE Advanced Level (GCE A-Level)	Junior College Year 2 students/Millennia Institute Year 3 students	May–December of current year	February of succeeding year	

== Provisions ==
SEAB oversees certain provisions and regulations on exam conduct to protect the integrity. The board also determines usage of certain Scientific calculator and Electronic dictionary models, as well as monitoring current events such as train disruptions to minimize unplanned disruptions when exams are underway, and archival of examination papers including the ten year series editions.

== Organisation Structure ==
SEAB is governed by a board which is led by a chairman. The Chief Executive is the professional head of the organisation. Under the Chief Executive are various divisions organised into two clusters: Assessment and Exam Cluster and Corporate Cluster. Divisions in each cluster are led by Directors/Deputy Directors.
