= Saint Joseph's Church, Bukit Timah =

Catholic church in Singapore

Saint Joseph's Church
- Saint Joseph's Church, Bukit Timah
- SJC Bukit Timah
- 聖若瑟堂
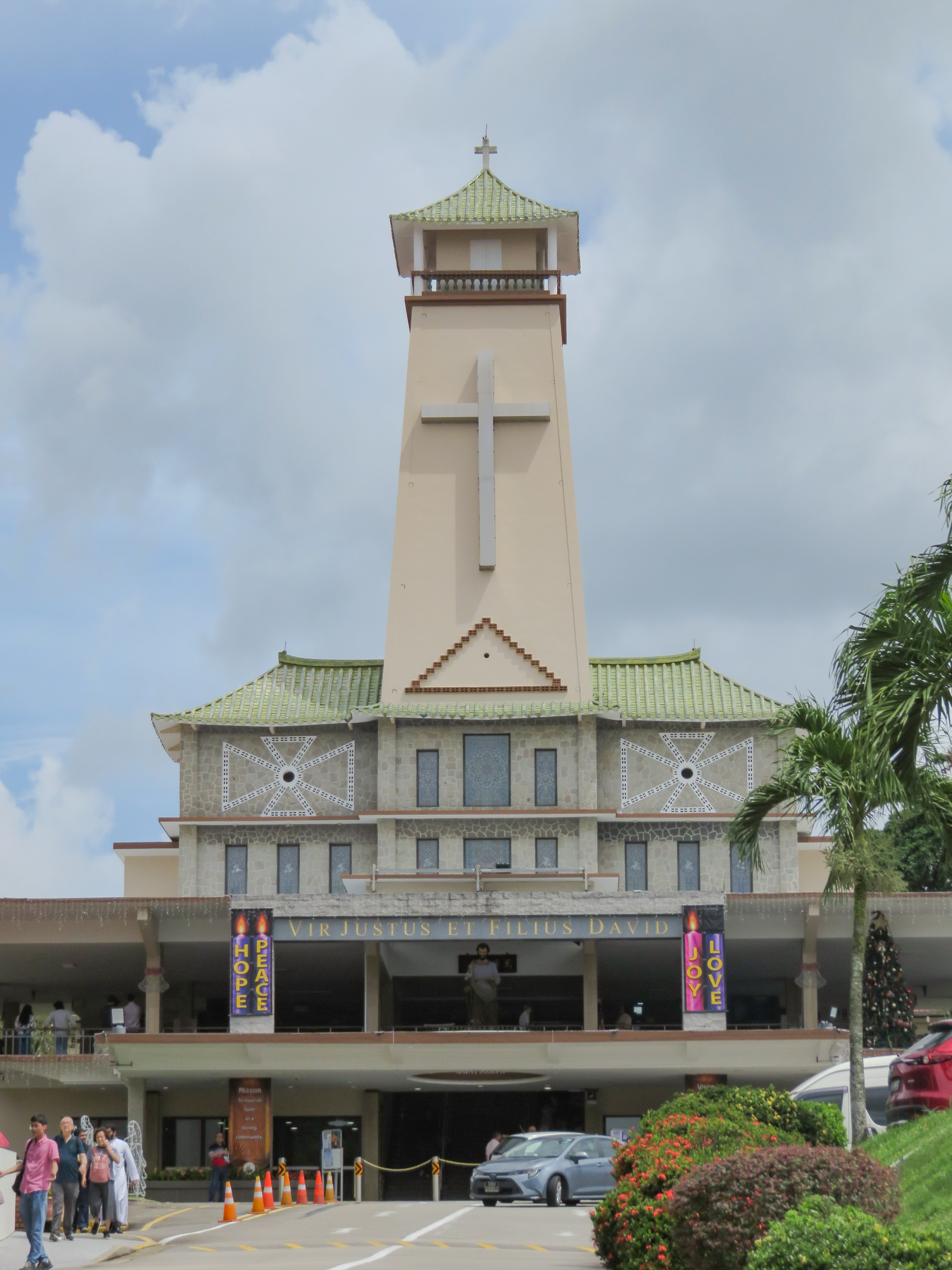
- Saint Joseph's Church in 2025
- Saint Joseph's Church
- 1.3679361°N 103.7669635°E
- Location: 620 Upper Bukit Timah Road, Singapore 678116
- Country: Singapore
- Denomination: Catholic
- Website: https://stjoseph-bt.org.sg/index.php

History
- Former name: Kranji Chapel
- Founder: Anatole Mauduit

Architecture
- Architectural type: Gothic and Romanesque design
- Groundbreaking: 1846
- Completed: 1853 (current building)

Administration
- District: North District

Saint Joseph's Church (Chinese: 聖若瑟堂) is a Catholic church in Bukit Timah, Singapore. It is located at Upper Bukit Timah Road along the boundary of the Bukit Panjang and Bukit Batok planning areas, within the Northern District of Singapore. Established in 1845, Saint Joseph's Church is the second oldest church in Singapore, after the Cathedral of the Good Shepherd, and is also the last remaining Catholic church to feature a cemetery.

== History ==
=== Kranji Chapel (1845–1900) ===
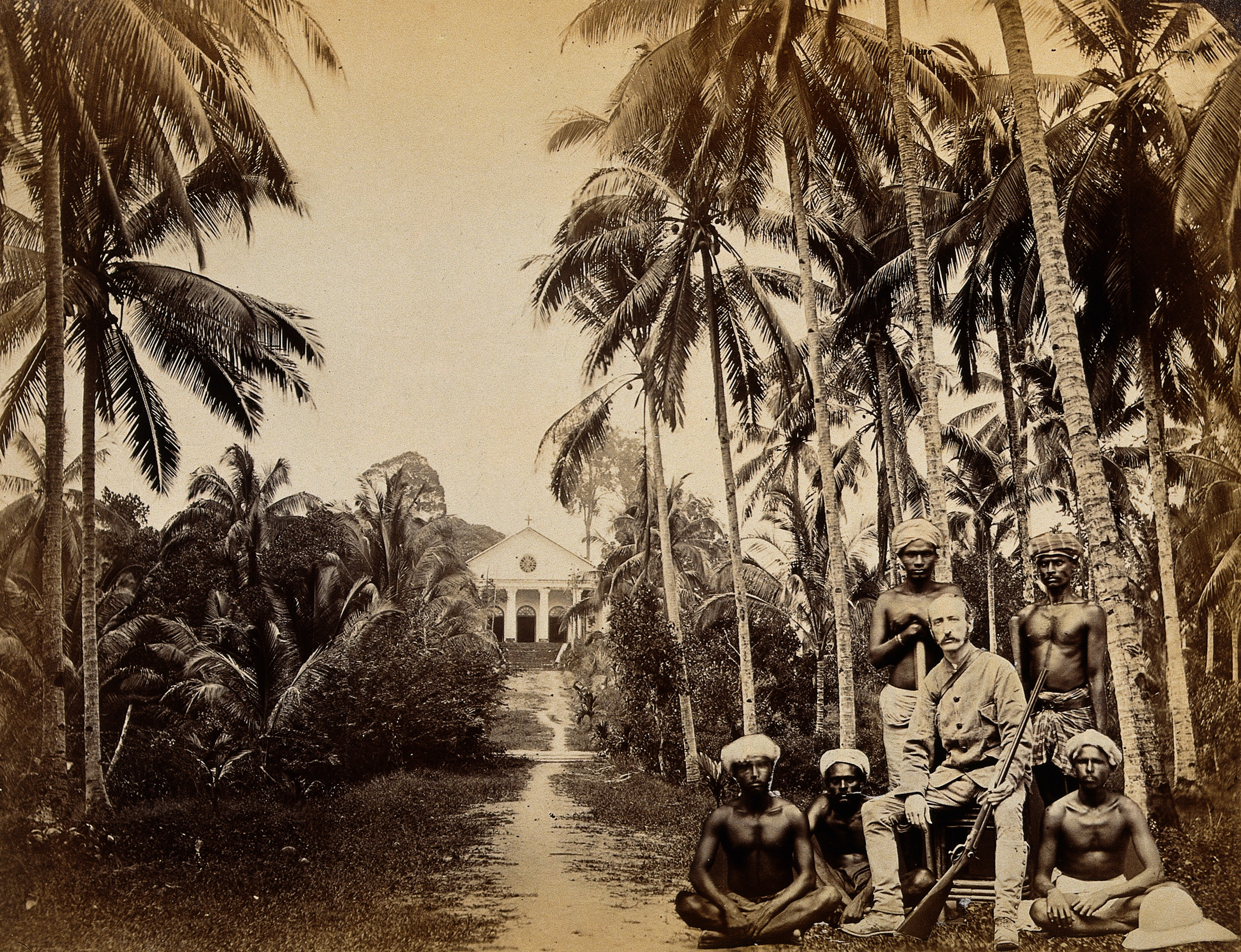
Saint Joseph's Church in 1880

In December 1845, Father Anatole Mauduit, M.E.P. (1817 – 1 April 1858) made his way to the Straits Settlements (present-day Singapore) in search of Chinese Christians who were labouring away in plantations. Mauduit was from Coutances, Normandy, France, and studied Chinese.

He was sent to the Straits Settlements by Jean-Marie Beurel and, in 1846, founded a Mission Station near the Kranji River, the Kranji Chapel, a small attap chapel. Mauduit was paid £30 per year for his work. By 1853, his congregation had grown so large that he had to build a new chapel – Saint Joseph's Church, at the present site. Mauduit fundraised to build the new chapel that was described as a "Palladian portico supported by six Doric columns".

Many would make their way to Saint Joseph's Church every Feast Day to celebrate. This devotion to Saint Joseph's Church came soon after the arrival of the statue of the saint, Saint Joseph, in 1861.

=== Relocation and rebuilding (1901–2000) ===
Christians of Saint Joseph's Church faced multiple problems such as secret societies, tigers, plantation failures, and a dwindling congregation.

In the 1910s, the parish priests decided to plant a rubber plantation around the church and this helped to bring Christians back to the district. By the 1930s, Saint Joseph's Church had become a pilgrimage destination for Christians of Malaysia and Singapore. After the war, many families settled in the districts around the church, this was also the Baby Boom generation.

When Father Joachim Teng (1911–1994) took over of Saint Joseph's Church in the 1950s, he tackled the overpopulation at the parish by beginning the process of rebuilding the church with no resources. One way that Teng raised money was by organising a food and fun fair at the parish every Feast Day, since then, it has become a church tradition. Teng also reared cattle within the church's compound to produce milk which he then sold for income.

Teng finally completed the new Saint Joseph's Church in the early 1960s. Saint Joseph's Church was blessed on 30 August 1964 by then-Archbishop Michel Olçomendy.

In 1991, the parish installed life-sized Stations of the Cross around the church's boundary – these have since become an important part to the church's devotional traditions. During the Season of Lent, Catholics would make a pilgrimage to the church to journey along these Stations. In 1995, the parish’s columbarium was opened and blessed by then-Archbishop Gregory Yong, this was followed by the building of a new parish hall in 1997.

=== Saint Joseph's Church, Bukit Timah (2001–present) ===
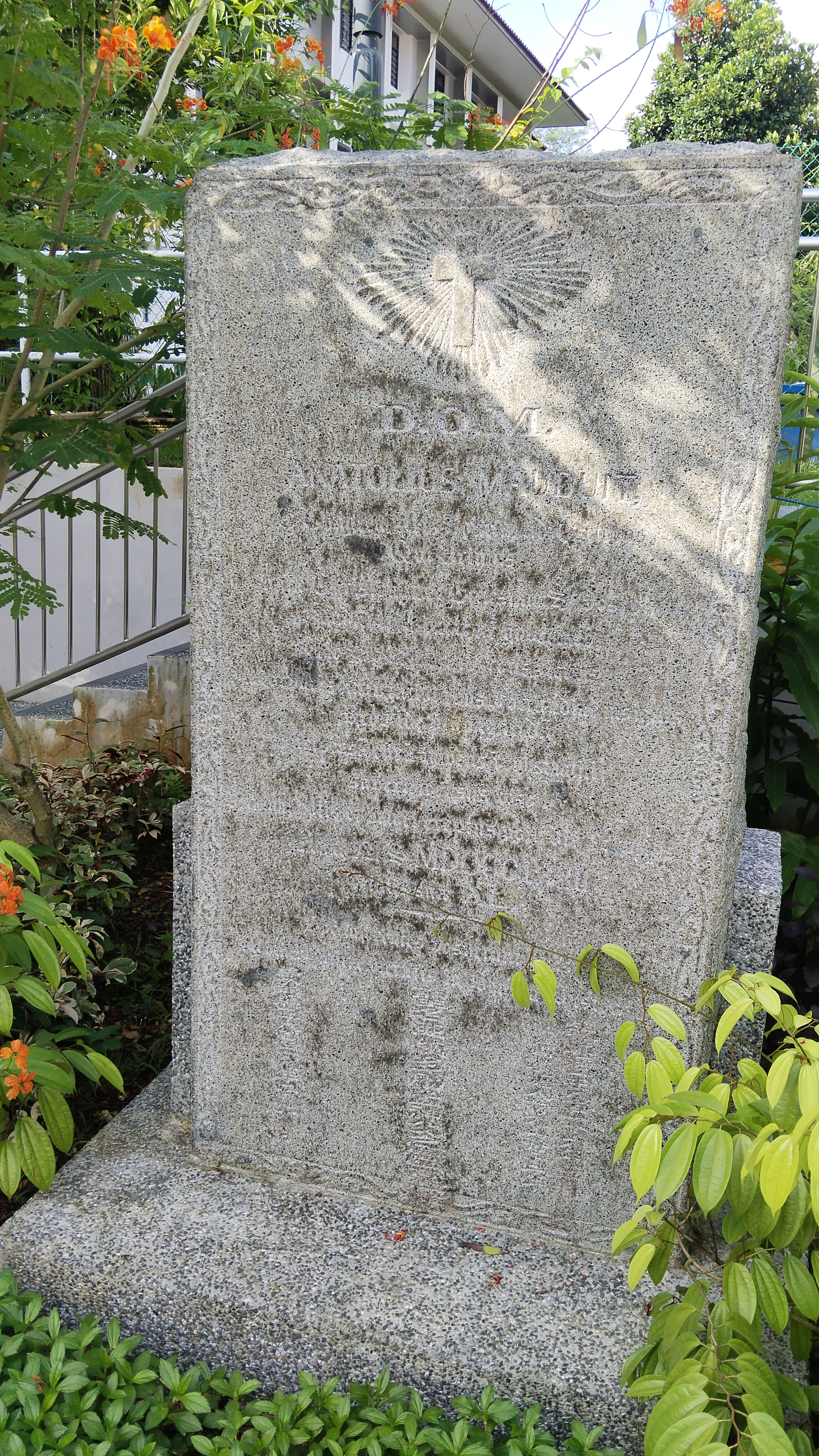
Mauduit's headstone, located in the Rosary Garden.

On 1 May 2012, then-Archbishop Nicholas Chia consecrated the church. The church's Rosary Garden is another life-sized pilgrimage and devotion trail that was blessed on 25 March 2017 by Archbishop William Goh. Mauduit's headstone is also located in the garden.

On 9 November 2024, a parish priest was stabbed by a Sinhalese man during a communion at the parish’s monthly children's mass. On 21 December 2025, a church volunteer was arrested for making a false bomb threat by placing an improvised bag that resembles a bomb. As a result of the hoax, church services were suspended for a day.

== Architecture ==
Saint Joseph's Church was rebuilt by Father Joachim Teng in the 1950s to accommodate the larger congregation size and the new design also showcases the church's Chinese heritage.

== See also ==
- Archdiocese of Singapore
- Catholic Church in Singapore
