= Catholic Church in Singapore =

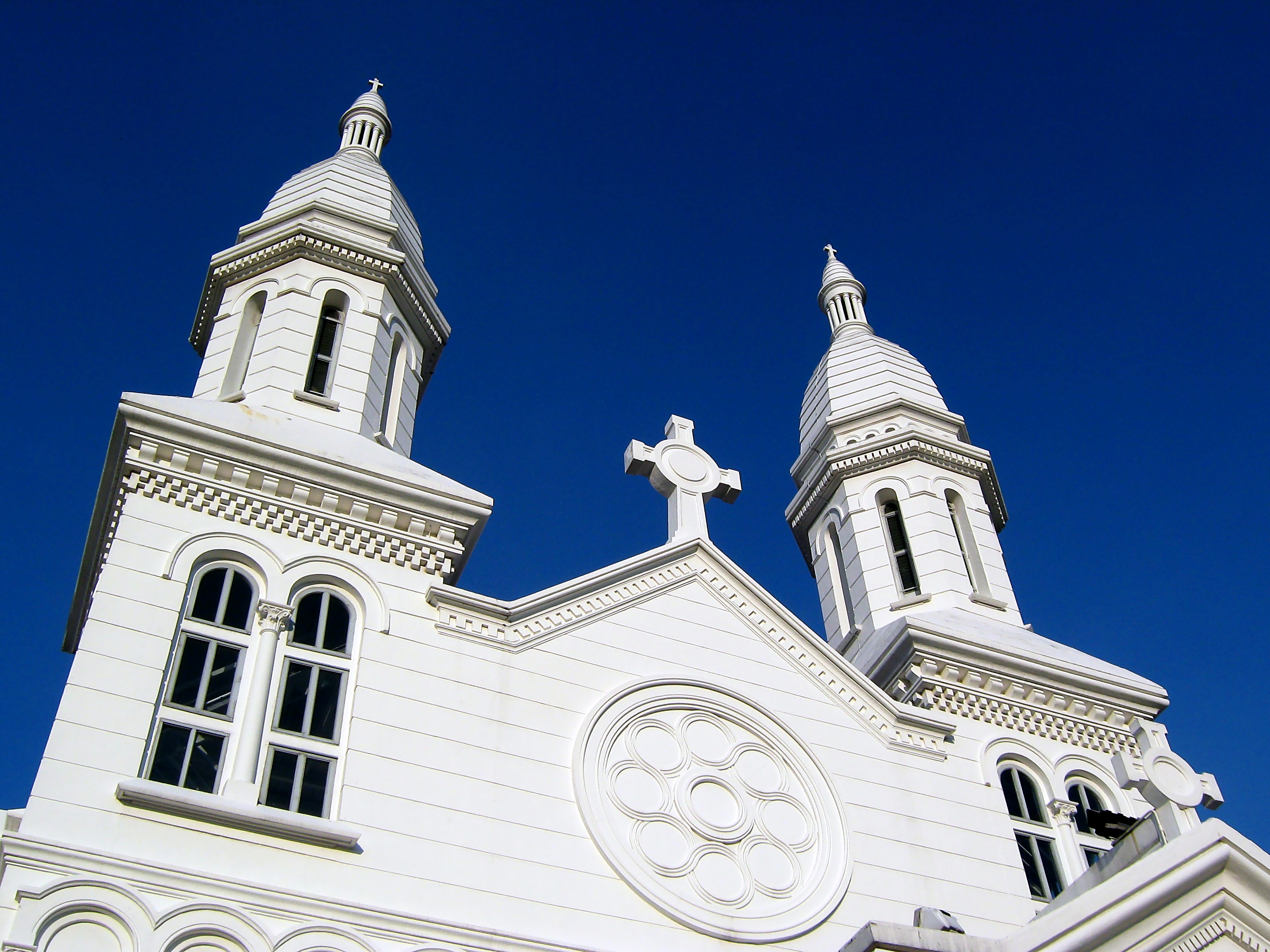
- Church of St. Teresa In Kampong Bahru, Singapore. It was gazetted as a National Monument by the National Heritage Board on 11 November 2009.
- Type: National polity
- Classification: Catholic
- Orientation: Asian Christianity, Latin
- Scripture: Bible
- Theology: Catholic theology
- Governance: CBCMSB
- Pope: Leo XIV
- Apostolic Nuncio: Marek Zalewski
- Archbishop: William Cardinal Goh
- Region: Singapore
- Language: Ecclesiastical Latin; English
- Headquarters: Cathedral of the Good Shepherd
- Separations: Protestantism in Singapore
- Official website: catholic.sg

The Catholic Church in Singapore is part of the worldwide Catholic Church, under the spiritual leadership of the Pope in Rome. In 2016, the Catholic Foundation of Singapore reported the Catholic population in Singapore to be over 373,000.

According to the 2020 census, 18.9% of Singaporeans identify as Christians – 37.1% of which identified as Catholic and the 62.9% as 'Other Christians' (chiefly Protestants).

It is currently led by Cardinal William Goh, the 4th Archbishop of Singapore.

== History ==
Catholicism in Singapore has its roots from the Portuguese presence in Asia. It is believed that the first Catholic priest set foot in Singapore in 1821, two years after Stamford Raffles' landing, to attend to the needs of the growing community consisting largely of British colonialists and some Chinese; however, it is probable that there had been Portuguese missionaries operating out of Malacca in Singapore during the Portuguese period, 1511–1641, prior to the British conquest.

=== Founder ===
Acknowledged as the founder of the Catholic Church here, Father Jean-Marie Beurel was notable for initiating the building of several Catholic churches, such as the Cathedral of the Good Shepherd and for establishing the first Missionary schools in Singapore. Of the initial Missionary schools, the Convent of the Holy Infant Jesus, founded in 1854, was in the care of the Sisters of the Infant Jesus. These institutions catered to students of all faiths and backgrounds and many of the non-Catholics subsequently became converts.

=== Subdivisions ===
Historically (prior to independence in 1965), Catholic communities were divided along racial lines – centred along the entire length of Queen St in town:

- The vast majority of Catholics in the early years of Singapore would comprise the Eurasians, who were chiefly located in the Waterloo St and Serangoon Road areas and were members of St Joseph's Church (143 Victoria St, rear of Queen St), the former Portuguese Mission church, along with two schools, St Anthony's Boys School and St Anthony's Convent.
- The British and other Europeans congregated at the Cathedral of the Good Shepherd. (1A Queen St)
- Tamil Catholics, added the Church of Our Lady of Lourdes on Ophir Road, at the other end of Queen St.
- Chinese Catholics in the city area were found at Sts Peter and Paul (Queen St), and the Sacred Heart Church (Tank Road).

Conversion to Catholicism among the Chinese community in the 19th century was met with disdain among Chinese immigrant societies in Singapore. Many of these Chinese Catholic converts, a large number of whom were wealthy plantation owners, were frequently subjected to harassment from fellow Chinese and working class organised gangs. These were mainly located in the Upper Serangoon and Hougang areas where the Church of the Nativity of the Blessed Virgin Mary is located in what was traditionally a Teochew speaking heartland.

=== Japanese occupation ===
During World War II, in an attempt to manage the growing needs of the local people in Singapore, many Catholics of Eurasian and Chinese ethnicity were deported to Bahau, also aptly called "Fuji Village" at that time, to be self-sufficient in their own food supply.

=== Contemporary era ===
In 2005, Singapore held an exhibition, dubbed Journey of Faith, on artefacts from Vatican City in the Asian Civilisations Museum at Empress Building, Catholic-oriented artifacts, focusing on art and history, were put on display from June to October 2005.

The Catholic Church in Singapore was under dual jurisdiction for most of its history, one tracing authority from the Vicariate Apostolate of Siam down to the present Archdiocese of Singapore and the other with the authority from the Portuguese Mission first from the Archdiocese of Goa and then the Diocese of Macau. This was a legacy of the padroado pronouncement in the 16th century. Dual jurisdiction was ended in 1981, when the Portuguese Mission handed over St Joseph's Church to the Archdiocese of Singapore and, thus, the whole island of Singapore was brought under the Archdiocese of Singapore.

On 29 May 2022, Pope Francis announced that Archbishop of Singapore William Goh would be appointed as a cardinal in August of that year, making him the first native Singaporean cardinal in history.

=== 2024 Papal Visit ===
In 2024, Pope Francis planned to visit Singapore as part of his papal tour. On 11 September 2024, Pope Francis arrived in Singapore. While at the Changi International Airport, Pope Francis was welcomed in a small reception by Singapore's Minister of Culture, Community and Youth Edwin Tong, Tong's wife and a delegation of government and church officials such as Ambassador of Singapore to the Holy See Ang Janet Guat Har. He also received flowers from a group of children.

After departing the airport, Pope Francis held a meeting with some Jesuits at Saint Francis Xavier Retreat Centre. On 12 September 2024, Pope Francis visited the Singapore Parliament, where he received a welcome ceremony and met with both President Tharman Shanmugaratnam and Prime Minister and Minister for Finance Lawrence Wong. He also received a private meeting with Senior Minister Lee Hsien Loong in the afternoon and delivered a state address while speaking Italian at the National University of Singapore’s University Cultural Centre. He also held a mass, which attended by 50,000, at the country's National Stadium. On 13 September 2024 the pope met elderly and sick residents, as well as staff, of St. Theresa's Home and hold an interreligious meeting with young people at Singapore's Catholic Junior College before departing from the country and returning to Rome.

Key themes of the pope's Singapore visit were interreligious dialogue, aging society, and education. In contrast to Pope John Paul II's 1986 visit to Singapore which lasted only five hours, Pope Francis stayed in the country for less than 48 hours.

== List of Catholic churches in Singapore ==
- Cathedral of the Good Shepherd
- Church of Sts. Peter and Paul
- Church of Our Lady of Lourdes
- Church of St. Joseph (Victoria Street) (Rochor)
- Church of Divine Mercy
- Church of St. Bernadette
- Church of St. Michael
- Church of St. Teresa
- Church of the Sacred Heart
- Church of Our Lady of Perpetual Succour
- Church of Saint Alphonsus (Novena Church)
- Church of the Holy Family
- Church of Our Lady Queen of Peace
- Church of St. Stephen
- Church of the Holy Trinity
- Church of the Blessed Sacrament
- Church of St. Francis of Assisi
- Church of St. Mary of the Angels
- Church of the Holy Cross
- Church of St. Anthony
- Church of Christ the King
- Church of St. Ignatius
- Church of Our Lady Star of the Sea
- Church of the Holy Spirit
- Church of the Nativity of the Blessed Virgin Mary
- Church of the Risen Christ
- Church of St. Francis Xavier
- Church of St. Vincent de Paul
- Church of St. Joseph (Bukit Timah)
- Church of the Immaculate Heart of Mary
- Church of St. Anne
- Church of the Transfiguration (COTT)

== List of foreign Catholic communities in Singapore ==
- Indonesian Catholic Community in Singapore (KKIS - Keluarga Katolik Indonesia di Singapura)
- Indonesian Charismatic Catholic Holy Spirit Prayer Group (KKIHS - Karismatik Katolik Indonesia Holy Spirit)
- German-speaking Catholic Parish of Saint Elisabeth in Singapore (Deutschsprachige Katholische Gemeinde Sankt Elisabeth)
- French speaking Catholic Community (Communauté Catholique Francophone de Singapour)
- Burmese-speaking Catholic Community (Myanmar Catholic Community Singapore)

== Education ==
The Catholic Church operates kindergartens, primary schools, secondary schools and a junior college, Catholic Junior College. Some schools are operated by the archdiocese and others are under the trusteeship of various religious orders such as the Sisters of the Infant Jesus.

== See also ==
- Archdiocese of Singapore
- List of Catholic churches in Singapore
- Christianity in Singapore
