= Church of the Risen Christ =

Roman Catholic church in Singapore

Religion
- Affiliation: Roman Catholic
- Diocese: Archdiocese of Singapore
- Rite: Latin Rite
- Ecclesiastical or organisational status: Parish church
- Leadership: Rev Fr Brian De Souza
- Year consecrated: 1971; 55 years ago
- Status: Active

Location
- Location: 91 Toa Payoh Central, Singapore 319193
- Interactive map of Church of the Risen Christ

Architecture
- Type: Parish church
- Completed: 1971; 55 years ago

Website
- http://www.risenchrist.org.sg

The Church of the Risen Christ (Chinese: 耶稣复活堂) is a Roman Catholic church in Singapore. It is located at Toa Payoh Central in the Toa Payoh Housing Estate and was founded in 1971.

== History ==
=== Construction ===
The growing Roman Catholic community of Toa Payoh originally conducted their religious activities at the Ho Ping Centre and then at the Social Function Hall of the HDB East Area Office. The first mass was celebrated in the function hall on 6 April 1969.

In June 1969, religious bodies in Singapore were invited by the Singapore Government to tender for a piece of land of 40,000 square feet (3,700 m^{2}). A month later, the government announced that a Roman Catholic church would be built at the junction of Toa Payoh Central and Lorong 4. The announcement sparked off a massive challenge of raising $450,000 for a church building, which fell on the shoulders of the late Rev Fr Pierre Abrial and Rev Fr Adrian Anthony.

While contributions were forthcoming from benefactors and parishioners, Fr Abrial had to make personal visits to parishioners to ask for further donations, some of which were collected over 18 months instalments. By mid-June 1971, they were only some $30,000 short of the target. This shortage was eventually filled by the parishioners over the next few months. About two weeks later, the Church of the Risen Christ was officially opened on 3 July 1971 by Archbishop Michel Olcomendy.

Originally, the Church was to be known as Church of the Resurrection, but was changed to Church of the Risen Christ as the former term was found to be rather abstract and impersonal. A quotation from the souvenir magazine published in conjunction with the Church's official opening cites the following rationale:

"The name RISEN CHRIST expresses in a better way the unique character of the Easter event. We believe in a Risen Christ. We believe that He is alive and that we have a relationship with God through Him. Our Church stands as a permanent witness to such a faith".

=== Expansion ===
Situated in the centre of the new satellite town, Church of the Risen Christ was meant to serve a population of 200,000 middle and low-income flat owners. As Toa Payoh town estate grew in its affluence and size, so did the Church and its parish community.

In an effort to reduce noise from the road traffic nearby, Church of the Risen Christ became among the first Roman Catholic Church to install an air-conditioning system within its premises in 1974.

The grotto was later built in 1990 in honour of the Virgin Mary. Upon its completion, the grotto was blessed by Archbishop Gregory Yong on 15 August 1990, the Feast of the Assumption. The Grotto since became a place of devotions and prayers for individuals, families and church groups. The wooden shed and benches were added during the last renovation.

One notable incident involving the church was a burglary on 17 May 1999 that resulted in the theft of $50,000 from the church's safe. This money consisted of the church's weekend collection, money for additional church expenses, and donations from a special religious celebration held on the Thursday prior to the burglary.

As time went on by, space constraints posed a growing concern. Catechism classes for children were conducted in places like the sacristy and kitchen, thereby impeding on the priests' privacy and opportunity for interaction. Hence, the Church decided to build a new extension that would meet the needs of the growing community. Construction on the new 4-storey extension began in early 2003. Costing approximately $3.5 million, the new building houses the priest quarters and kitchen and contains 13 rooms that double up as classrooms and meeting rooms.

=== Renovation ===
At the same time, renovations within the church were carried out. The flight of stairs leading up to the Main Entrance was replaced by a new staircase with an extension built to house a youth room and an auditorium. A mural painting of Jesus preaching to a small crowd with the Lake Galilee in the background adorns the inner wall of the extension. To reduce renovation cost and time, layering of new floor tiles over existing ones was carried out. Small stained glass windows depicting the Passion of the Lord replaced the previous orange lanterns with illustrations of the scenes of the Passion. The old seating benches gave way to sturdy new ones, while the use of hymn books and bible leaflets were discontinued with the use of projectors and television screens displaying liturgical prayers, bible readings, hymns and announcements during mass. The church opened the new extension for viewing to the parishioners in November 2003.

=== Present-day ===
Due to redevelopment works at the Church of St Alphonsus (Novena Church), its Saturday Novena devotions are now conducted at Risen Christ. As at Novena Church, the devotion is conducted in English and Chinese, although the number of sessions has been reduced to six.

== Music ==
=== Choirs ===
Choirs at the Church of the Risen Christ sing a varied repertoire of hymns and songs, from contemporary works to traditional hymns and chants.

One of the more renowned choirs was the Peter Low Choir, which was based in the parish from 1970 until 2002, when it shifted to the Cathedral of the Good Shepherd to become the Cathedral Choir of the Risen Christ. The choir has gone on numerous tours around the world, even singing for the Pope and his audience of 30,000 on 5 June 1985 at Saint Peter's Square in the Vatican City. The Choir was known as the Risen Christ Choir while it was based at the Church of the Risen Christ, and it was during this period that its first 3 LPs were released, including the WEA album, "Christmas in Singapore." The choir also recorded and was featured in the original TV broadcast for Singaporean National Day songs in the 80s such as "Count on Me, Singapore" and "We are Singapore".

=== Organs ===
The Parish houses 2 Allen Digital Pipe Organs, which forms the foundation of congregational worship in the Liturgy and choral accompaniment.

The pipe organ is the instrument that is held in high esteem in the Roman Catholic Church for use in its liturgical celebrations. Musicam Sacram, which is a document issued by the Church on the use of music in the liturgy, states "The pipe organ is to be held in high esteem in the Latin Church, since it is its traditional instrument, the sound of which can add a wonderful splendor to the Church's ceremonies and powerfully lift up men's minds to God and higher things."

The organ has an integral place in liturgical music in the Church of the Risen Christ, and is the sole instrument that accompanies the congregation and choirs during the mass. The organ is also used together with other encouraged forms of liturgical music like choral polyphony and plainchant. It is hoped that this total experience of liturgical music will lead the faithful to a greater awareness of the divine in the liturgical celebrations, and help the faithful to truly sing the mass, and not just sing at mass.

The Choir Loft Organ is a new one that was purchased in 2010 for use in Sunday masses and replaces an older Allen which served the church for a good 20 years. The new instrument is an Allen Quantum 2 manual and pedal instrument with 45 stops or voices. Other notable features include a set of 6 voicebanks which allow the entire organ's voices to be changed to sound like pipe organs built in different musical periods or countries. These include the American Classic, Cavaillé-Coll (French), Arp Schnitger (North German baroque), English Cathedral, Schlicker and Orchestral (pipe organ with orchestral sounds).

The other Allen Organ was purchased in 1998 to replace the ageing organ in the Sanctuary used for weekday services. It is a small instrument with over 20 stops.

== Organisation ==
The church has a parish population of 8000 served by 3 priests:

- Rev Fr Brian D'Souza (Parish Priest)
- Rev Fr Arun Bellarmin
- Rev Fr John Bin Shan

== Controversies ==
On 4 October 2021, a 65-year old retiree fell violently ill and was hospitalised after consuming ivermectin at the urging of a group of close friends from the Church of the Risen Christ. The group claimed that the mRNA vaccine was against God and urged her not to get vaccinated. They also claimed that the virus was a test of faith and that vaccines were Satanic. Upon hospitalization, the group administrators quickly removed the retiree from Telegram chats and erased all conversations with her.

== See also ==
- Archdiocese of Singapore
- Roman Catholicism in Singapore
- Toa Payoh New Town
