= Xie Yiyu =

Xie Yiyu may refer to:

- Nicholas Chia (Chinese: 谢益裕; pinyin: Xiè Yìyù, born 1938), Singaporean Roman Catholic priest
- Lyddia Cheah (Chinese: 谢沂逾; pinyin: Xiè Yíyú, born 1989), Malaysian badminton player
