= Church of St Mary of the Angels =

Roman Catholic church in Singapore

Church of St. Mary of the Angels
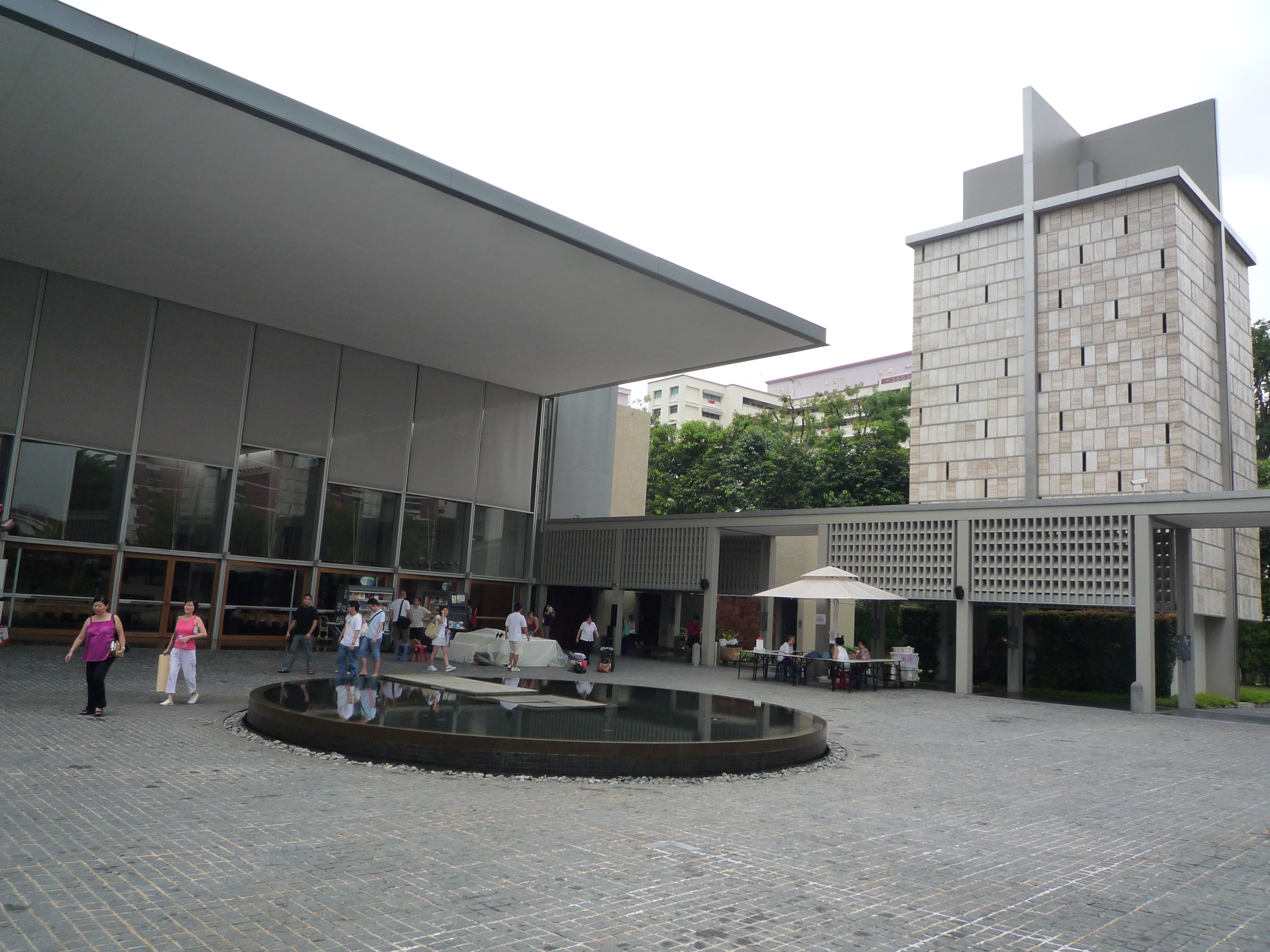

Religion
- Affiliation: Roman Catholic
- Diocese: Archdiocese of Singapore
- Leadership: Archbishop William Goh

Location
- Location: 5 Bukit Batok East Avenue 2, Singapore 659918
- Interactive map of Church of St. Mary of the Angels
- Coordinates: 1.3471°N 103.7597°E

Architecture
- Architect: WOHA Architects Pte Ltd
- Established: 1970
- Construction cost: $16.5 million

Website
- www.stmary.sg

The Church of St. Mary of the Angels is a Roman Catholic church in Singapore completed in 2004. It is located in the Bukit Batok Planning Area, within the West Region of Singapore. The church is home to both a parish community and Franciscan monastery. Currently, the parish is home to some 8,500 parishioners.

== History ==
It grew out of the work of a group of Franciscan friars in the 1950s. The building was awarded the Singapore Institute of Architects Religious Building category award in 2004, and Design of the Year award at the first President's Design Award in 2006. It was designed by Singapore-based WOHA Architects.

With effect from 2026, the newly appointed Parish Priest is Friar Esmond Chua OFM, with the assistance of three other priests, Friar Julian Mariaratnam OFM, Friar Justin Lim OFM, and Friar Robin Toha OFM

== The "Last Chance" Mass ==
Over the years, the parish had rapid growth in the number of parishioners, which resulted in most of the weekend Masses being very crowded. In 2011, the 5.30pm Mass on Sunday became just as crowded as the Sunday Morning Masses. The parish saw the need to add in a new Mass timing to cater to the crowd. With that, the Sunday 7.15pm Mass started, with the initial aim to cater to the crowd. It now caters to many parishioners, as well as people who are on shift work and are unable to attend Mass at any other timing on Sundays. The mass timing has since changed to 7.00pm.

== See also ==
- Christianity in Singapore
- Roman Catholicism in Singapore
- Archdiocese of Singapore
- List of Roman Catholic churches in Singapore
