= Francis Chan (bishop) =

Roman Catholic bishop (1913–1967)

His Excellency, The Right Reverend Monsignor Francis Chan
- Bishop of Penang
- Church: Roman Catholic Church
- See: Penang
- Appointed: 25 February 1955
- Term ended: 20 October 1967
- Predecessor: Position established
- Successor: Gregory Yong

Orders
- Ordination: 4 December 1939
- Consecration: 28 August 1955 by Martin Lucas

Personal details
- Born: 25 July 1913 Singapore, Straits Settlements
- Died: 20 October 1967 (aged 54) George Town, Penang, Malaysia
- Buried: Western Road Cemetery, George Town
- Denomination: Roman Catholic
- Residence: Singapore; Ipoh; Penang
- Education: St. Joseph's Institution; College General

Styles of Francis Chan
- Reference style: His Excellency, The Right Reverend Monsignor
- Spoken style: Your Excellency
- Religious style: Bishop

Ordination history of Francis Chan
History
Episcopal consecration
- Principal consecrator: Martin Lucas (Apos. Int. Nunc. India)
- Co-consecrators: Victor Bazin (Rangoon); Louis-August Chorin (Bangkok vic. apos.)

Francis Chan (25 July 1913 – 20 October 1967) was a Singaporean bishop of the Catholic Church. After finishing high school in Singapore, he studied for the priesthood at College General in Penang and was ordained a priest in 1939. Chan first served as an assistant pastor in Ipoh until 1946, with a three year interruption due to World War II. He subsequently returned to his hometown after the Japanese occupation ended and served as parish priest there for nine years. When the Holy See created the first two Malaysian dioceses of Kuala Lumpur and Penang in 1955, Chan was appointed as bishop of the latter see. He was consecrated in August of that same year, becoming one of the first two local bishops from Malaysia. A Council Father of the Second Vatican Council, Chan attended two sessions held at St. Peter's Basilica in 1962 and 1964. He died of terminal cancer in 1967. Chan was dubbed "The Singing Bishop" due to his penchant for music.

== Early life ==
Chan was born on 25 July 1913 in Singapore, which was a part of the Straits Settlements at the time. He studied at St. Joseph's Institution for secondary school, and subsequently attended seminary at the College General in Tanjung Bungah, Penang (another territory of the Straits Settlements). On 4 December 1939, he was ordained to the Catholic priesthood. (Note: The article from The Straits Times states that Chan was "ordained when he was 20" (which would place the year of his priestly ordination between 1933 and 1934). This is incorrect because the canonical age for ordination to the presbyterate is 25, per canon 975 of the 1917 Code of Canon Law. Chan did not attain this age until 1938.) He offered his first Mass on 10 December at the Church of the Sacred Heart in his hometown.

== Presbyteral ministry ==
Chan's first pastoral assignment was as assistant parish priest at the Church of St. Michael in Ipoh, then part of the Federated Malay States. He served in this role from 1939 to 1941, and again from 1944 to 1946 after the Japanese occupation of Malaya. Subsequently, he was transferred back to his hometown and served as parish priest of the Church of the Nativity of the Blessed Virgin Mary between 1946 and 1955. On the first day of every month, he organized a communal Rosary and offered a Mass to pray for all family members of parishioners who had died during the Japanese occupation of Singapore. He also founded the Catholic Young Men’s Association and the Children of Mary Movement during his time as parish priest. During his first two years as pastor, he resided at the St. Francis Xavier Seminary in Punggol. From December 1951 until October 1953, Chan's assistant at the Church of the Nativity was Gregory Yong, who would later go on to be Chan's successor as Bishop of Penang in 1968.

One of Chan's noteworthy friendships was with Sultan Ibrahim of Johor. At the start of Chan's tenure as parish priest, the sultan gave Chan a marble statue of the Immaculate Conception of the Blessed Virgin Mary as a "token of [their] friendship". The statue was blessed by Chan on 8 December 1946, the Solemnity of the Immaculate Conception, and it is still situated in the church courtyard as of 2020.

== Episcopal ministry ==
Chan was appointed as the first Bishop of Penang on 25 February 1955, the same day on which Pope Pius XII established the first two dioceses in Malaysia (the other being Kuala Lumpur). Chan was consecrated bishop on 28 August 1955 at the Cathedral of the Good Shepherd in Singapore, and moved to Penang three weeks later. He and Dominic Vendargon of Kuala Lumpur were the first bishops who were local Malaysians, as opposed to foreign missionaries. As the first Bishop of Penang, Chan is mentioned by name in section 4(1) of the Roman Catholic Bishops (Incorporation) Act 1957, a federal Act of Parliament that incorporates the diocese and grants it use of a corporate seal. He was a "staunch advocate" for ecumenism and backed the Council of Christian Churches.

On 18 June 1961, Chan ordained his own nephew, Francis Lau, to the priesthood. Lau would later become the vicar general of the Archdiocese of Singapore and was made a Prelate of Honour of His Holiness in 2000, in recognition of his service to the local church. Chan celebrated the silver jubilee of his priestly ordination in December 1964.

== Later years and death ==
The earliest mention of Chan suffering from terminal cancer was in 1963. He was cared for by the French Sisters of the Foreign Mission (the Grey Sisters). In spite of his ill health, he attended two out of the four sessions of the Second Vatican Council in 1962 and 1964, (Note: The Straits Times states that Chan "attended two sessions of the Vatican Council in 1962 and 1964", while Catholic-Hierarchy.org also include him as a participant in the Council's second session in 1963.) thus making him a Council Father. He made three trips to Hong Kong for specialist cancer treatment, the last one being in April 1967, and eventually he went blind in one eye as a result of the disease. He fell into a coma at his Macalister Road residence on the night of 20 October 1967 and died an hour and a half later, surrounded by four of his siblings who had arrived from Singapore and Ipoh earlier that same day. He was aged 54 and had been bedridden for the last three months of his life. His mortal remains lay in state at his home before his funeral was held three days later on 23 October at the Cathedral of the Assumption. He was interred at the Western Road Cemetery in George Town.

Chan was succeeded as Bishop of Penang by Gregory Yong on 1 July 1968. The cathedra (bishop's chair) that was first utilized by Chan at the Cathedral of the Assumption in 1955 is still in use, having been moved to Holy Spirit Cathedral when it was elevated to the status of cathedral in 2003.

== Personal life ==
Chan had three brothers – Joseph, Anthony, and John – who resided in Singapore at the time of his death, and at least one sister, Teresa, who lived in Ipoh. He was a classical music aficionado, particularly for opera. During his years in the seminary, he played the flute for their orchestra, and frequently sang as a tenor for the choir at the Church of the Sacred Heart. This passion for music led to him being nicknamed "The Singing Bishop" during his time in Penang.

== Notes ==
Catholic Church titles
New diocese	Bishop of Penang; 1955–1967	Succeeded by Gregory Yong
