= Roman Catholic Archdiocese of Malacca-Singapore =

The Archdiocese of Malacca-Singapore was a Latin archdiocese in Malaysia and Singapore.

== History ==
It was established as the Diocese of Malacca, and elevated to Archdiocese level in 1953.

In 1955, the Archdiocese of Malacca was split and an ecclesiastical province was formed in its place comprising the Archdiocese of Malacca-Singapore as the metropolitan see and the Diocese of Kuala Lumpur and Diocese of Penang as suffragan dioceses.

In 1972, Archdiocese of Malacca-Singapore was split into the Archdiocese of Singapore and the Diocese of Malacca-Johor. Michel Olçomendy was the archbishop during this entire period. After the split, he continued to serve as Archbishop of Singapore until retiring in 1976.
