= Church of Our Lady of Perpetual Succour =

Church in Singapore

- Church of Our Lady of Perpetual Succour
- 1°19′14.4″N 103°55′07.3″E
- Location: 31 Siglap Hill, Singapore 456085
- Country: Singapore
- Denomination: Roman Catholic
- Churchmanship: Roman Rite
- Website: www.olps.sg

History
- Status: Parish church
- Founded: 1961
- Dedication: Our Lady of Perpetual Succour
- Dedicated: 7 October 1961
- Consecrated: 1961

Architecture
- Functional status: Active
- Style: Modern
- Completed: 1961

Specifications
- Capacity: 1,600
- Materials: Concrete

Administration
- Division: East District
- Diocese: Archdiocese of Singapore

Clergy
- Priest(s): Rev. Fr. Dominique Demé (Administrator); Rev. Fr. Kenny Tan (On leave)

The Church of Our Lady of Perpetual Succour, also known as OLPS Church, is a Roman Catholic church in the Archdiocese of Singapore. It is located at Siglap Hill, Singapore, within the Siglap housing estate, near the Kembangan MRT station.

== Etymology ==
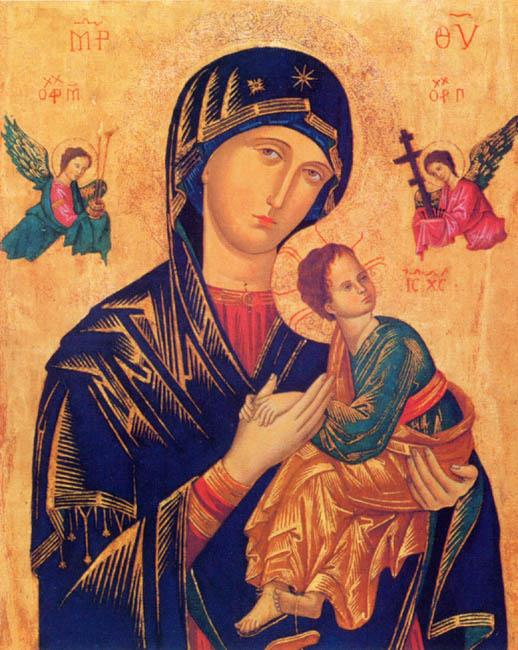
Our Lady of Perpetual Succour is a Roman Catholic title of the Blessed Virgin Mary as represented in a celebrated 15th-century Byzantine icon.

Our Lady of Perpetual Succour is the Roman Catholic title of the Blessed Virgin Mary as represented in a Byzantine icon from the 15th Century. The icon has been in Rome since 1499, and is permanently enshrined in the church of Sant'Alfonso di Liguori.

In the image, Mother Mary wears a dress of dark red that represents the Passion of Jesus, a blue mantle that represents her virginity, and a cloaked veil, which represents her pure modesty. She is looking towards the faithful, while pointing at her son, Jesus Christ, who seems frightened by the instruments of crucifixion while a sandal slips off his foot. The angel on the left is St Michael, who carries the lance and sponge of the crucifixion of Jesus while on the right is St Gabriel, depicted as carrying nails and a 3-bar cross used by Popes at the time. The Virgin Mary has a star on her forehead, signifying her role as Star of the Sea while the cross on the side has been claimed as referring to the school which produced the icon. In the painting, Mary's veil and her face itself are rounded, to indicate her holiness, as a halo was not commonly painted around the head in those days. The artist also made the size of the mother disproportionate to that of her son to emphasise the significance of Mary in the icon.

The Greek inscriptions read MP-ΘΥ (Μήτηρ Θεοῦ, Mother of God), ΟΑΜ (Ὁ Ἀρχάγγελος Μιχαήλ, Michael the Archangel), ΟΑΓ (Ὁ Ἀρχάγγελος Γαβριήλ, Gabriel the Archangel) and IC-XC (Ἰησοῦς Χριστός, Jesus Christ), respectively.

== History ==
It took almost seven years from conception to planning before OLPS Church was built in 1961. The idea to build a church beyond the Katong area was first given serious consideration in 1954. It was then felt that the Church of the Holy Family, Singapore could not accommodate the growing number of worshippers living in Katong and the then rural Siglap where more people were making their homes.

In 1955, Fr. Rene Ashness, Holy Family's parish priest launched the project by appealing for donations to have a church built in the Siglap area. Fr. Paul Munier, who became Holy Family's parish priest in 1957, continued with the appeal for donations. The members of the Church Building Committee went from house to house during their spare time to seek donations. They collected a sum adequate to buy 53,300 sq. feet of land at progress payments. The final cost for the building and professional fees was S$283,391.78.

The OLPS Church was blessed and declared open for worship on 7 October 1961 by Michael Olcomendy, Archbishop of the Malacca-Singapore Archdiocese. In the following years the parish population increased to some 8,500, and it was desired to provide catechism and kindergarten education for a growing number of children; there was consequently the need for more classrooms and amenities.

In 1993 plans were made to build a 3 1/2-storey extension to the church, housing additional classrooms, AVA rooms, a library and a small auditorium. Fr. John Lee, the parish priest, undertook this project and formed the Building Extension and Finance Committee to monitor the technical aspects of the extension and to source funds.

For almost two years, Fr. John Lee held meetings and discussions with the authorities, the architect, engineers and other professionals before calling for tenders. The first pile was sunk on 13 May 1996, and work progressed steadily. The new extension was ready for use in August 1997. A time capsule was installed at the foyer of the annex building with memorabilia pertaining to the church, to be opened in 2061 when the church celebrates its centenary.

Having completed the church's annex building, the renovation of the church building and the presbytery was necessary. It was decided to reconstruct rather than renovate the presbytery. The old priests' house was demolished in November 1998, and the priests were able to move into the new presbytery on 23 December 1999. It was officially blessed by Archbishop Gregory Yong on 22 January 2000. The presbytery houses an Adoration Room, "The Sanctuary", opened to parishioners on 2 February 2000 on the Feast of the Presentation of the Lord.

Tenders for renovation of the church building were called in August 1999 and renovation works took from December 1999 to 2001.

The church is now air-conditioned, yielding seating space of 1,600. The space on the ground floor was also expanded to provide better facilities, and a new kitchen, meeting rooms and a store-room for the SVDP Conference were built. There is a columbarium for 2500 niches.

== Feast day ==
The feast day of Our Lady of Perpetual Succour is on 27 June and the church celebrates its own feast day on 27 June if it falls on a Sunday, or around that date, depending on the scheduling of other events.

As of 2023, it was decided to shift the celebrations to October to be closer to the actual date that OLPS was declared opened (7 October).

=== Triduum ===
- A triduum is celebrated on the preceding Wednesday, Thursday and Friday.
- The Feast Day Mass is celebrated on Sunday at 6.00pm followed by a procession around the church compound. The Icon is then blessed and crowned.

=== Past feast days ===
Each year, a different theme is given for the feast day which helps the congregation focus on different aspects of their faith.

- 2011 - One Church + One Family (Golden Jubilee Celebration)
- 2012 - Neighbourhood Christian Communities
- 2013 - In Rock We Stand, On Faith We Come
- 2014 - Christ, Our Light
- 2015 - A People of Communion in Mission
- 2016 - Mary, Mother of Mercy
- 2017 - The Joy of the Lord is our strength
- 2018 - Arise after Me
- 2019 - Community
- 2021 - One Family Rooted in Christ
- 2022 - Witnessing
- 2023 - Be Restored
- 2024 - #olpsfeastday2024 - Celebrated the 63rd year with Masses held at St Stephen’s School
- 2025 - Hope Does Not Disappoint Us
- 2026 - Let It Be Done To Me
