= Church of Christ the King, Singapore =

Catholic church in SIngapore

Coordinates: 1°21′43″N 103°51′09″E

Church of Christ the King is a Catholic church on Ang Mo Kio Avenue 8 in Ang Mo Kio, Singapore. Completed in 1982, it was the first Catholic church in Ang Mo Kio. The church building was demolished and rebuilt in 2002. It remains the only Catholic church in the area.

== History ==
Plans for the two-storey church, estimated to cost around $1.5 million, were submitted in August 1980, with the land on which it was to be built having already been leased from the Housing and Development Board for 99 years. Construction was to begin as soon as approval was obtained. The building was to include 12 meeting rooms, a library, offices, an adjoining meeting hall and living quarters for priests. Father Louis Fossion was put in charge of the project, which was to serve around 5,500 Catholics living in the Ang Mo Kio area, who had to travel to churches in Toa Payoh, Upper Thomson and Serangoon Garden at the time.

The church's construction began in May 1981. The building, now estimated to cost $2 million, was the "costliest Catholic church" in Singapore at the time. It was to accommodate 600 people. By October, the number of Catholics in the Ang Mo Kio area had grown to around 7000. The church, which cost $3 million to build, making it "at least twice as expensive as any other church in Singapore", was officially opened by then-Roman Catholic Archbishop of Singapore Gregory Yong. Its first service was held in the month prior and its weekly services were reported to have received an average of 3,200 to 3,500 people by its opening. The church's construction was funded through donations from various parishes collected by Foisson, as well as fundraisers by religious organisations such as Mount Alvernia and the Carmelite Sisters, as well as several Catholic schools. The name "Christ the King" was chosen with the intent of "keeping with a general world trend of concentrating on Christ as the central figure."

As the church's congregation grew, the building was deemed "inadequate". It was demolished in 1999 and rebuilt, reopening in 2002. During the rebuilding of the church, an icon depicting the Mother of Perpetual Help was donated to the church. In January 2019, the church began serving as a shelter providing individuals sleeping on the streets with a place to stay during the night. They were provided with mattresses, pillows and fans. Those who wished to stay at the shelter could arrive from 9 p.m. onwards and were required to leave by 7 a.m. the following morning. Its façade features an icon of Christ the King, which was sculpted in Kerala in 1956. It was gifted by the Church of Our Lady Star of the Sea in Yishun.
