= Church of the Blessed Sacrament (Singapore) =

Roman Catholic Church in Singapore

Blessed Sacrament Church (Singapore)
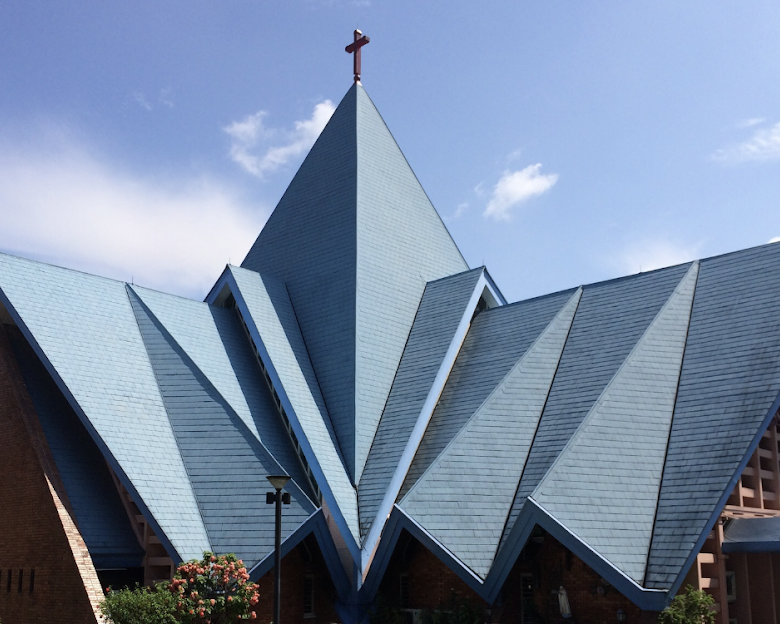
- The Church of the Blessed Sacrament (2025).
- Blessed Sacrament Church (Singapore)
- 1.295728°N 103.799279°E
- Location: 1 Commonwealth Drive, Singapore 149603
- Country: Singapore
- Denomination: Roman Catholic
- Website: www.bsc.org.sg

History
- Status: URA Conservation Status (since 2005)

Architecture
- Architectural type: Modernist (Tent-shaped roof)
- Style: Modernist (Tent-shaped roof) Architect: Y. Gordon Dowsett of Van Sitteren and Partners
- Groundbreaking: 1958 (Fundraising and planning)
- Completed: 8 May 1965 (Officially opened)

Administration
- District: Queenstown

Church of the Blessed Sacrament (often referred to as Blessed Sacrament Church or BSC) is a Roman Catholic Church located along Commonwealth Drive in the Queenstown, Singapore. Completed in 1965, the church is a prominent example of modernist religious architecture and is known for its distinctive folded, tent-like blue roof.

Built to serve the growing Catholic community in Singapore’s first public housing estate, Queenstown, the church was granted conservation status by the Urban Redevelopment Authority (URA) in 2005.

== History ==
The church's history began in 1958 when the Archbishop of Malacca, Michel Olçomendy, applied for a site to serve the communities in Queenstown, Alexandra, and Redhill, perturbed about the lack of a church in the satellite city. He approached the Congregation of the Sacred Hearts of Jesus and Mary for assistance in the founding of a new parish there.

Fathers William van Soest (who became the first parish priest) and Odo Tiggeloven, both Congregation of the Sacred Hearts of Jesus and Mary priests from the Dutch province, arrived in Singapore in 1958 to establish the new parish. Due to limited funds, the church was built in stages. Fundraising efforts were creative, including variety shows, movie screenings, and donations from groups like Circus Malaya.

On 7 November 1963, the first building, Damien Hall (named after Saint Damien of Molokai), was completed and served as the temporary place of worship and lodging for the priests.

The main church building was officially completed, opened on 8 May 1965, and blessed by Archbishop Olçomendy. It was built to accommodate around 1,500 people, serving a community of about 2,000 Catholics at the time.

In 2019 the Tent of Meeting Restoration (TOMR) project was launched, involving a major, $9.4 million renovation of the main church building, including its iconic roof, air-conditioning, and sound systems, as well as the removal of absestos in the ceiling. The church reopened its doors in October–November 2023, after a two-year facelift with a celebration and procession, the Threefold Celebration from thr 18th to the 25th of November.

On the Solemnity of Corpus Christi of 2023, Parish Priest Fr. Johan Wongso, SS.CC announced the new mission statement of the Church of the Blessed Sacrement, "To be an evangelising church with a Eucharistic spirituality " He explained that the statement emphasises the core of the spirituality of the community, the devotion of the Eucharist, the focal point of Christian Life. Fr. Johan added that Christ’s own Body and Blood is His greatest gift to them and that it is only by partaking in Christ’s Body and Blood in the Eucharist that we can live in Him and become fully united with the Body of Christ, the Church.

== Architecture ==
The church was designed by Y. Gordon Dowsett of Van Sitteren and Partners. It is renowned for its unique, sculptural design.

The most distinctive feature is the folded, pitched slate roof, which is constructed in a series of inverted pleats resembling a tent. This design symbolises the biblical Tent of Meeting, mentioned in the Old Testament, where Moses met with God. Integrated glass panels are placed where the four sections of the roof meet, allowing natural light to illuminate the sanctuary, which is built on a cruciform plan.

The worship hall features finished fair-faced brick walls and ceilings cladded in stained plywood, with rows of stained glass in multiple colours on the four walls, imparting a sense of warmth; a distinctive Celtic cross adorns the exterior brick wall behind the main altar and a modified Latin Crucifix directly behind the altar and on top of the church tabernacle.

During the 2023 restoration, Oliver Wihardja was commissioned to paint the Stations of the Cross in the church.

== Clergy ==
The church is currently served by priests from the Congregation of the Sacred Hearts of Jesus and Mary. (As of 2025)

- Parish Priest: Fr. Johan Wongso, SS.CC
- Assistant Parish Priests: Fr. Anthony Hutjes, SS.CC, Fr. Rusdi Santoso, SS.CC, Fr. Karolus Kapolok Huar, SS.CC and Fr. Sambodo Sru Ujianto, SS.CC.

== See also ==
- Roman Catholic Archdiocese of Singapore
- Church of Saint Francis Xavier, Singapore (Another Modernist Church designed by Alfred Wong)
