= Novena Church =

Church of Saint Alphonsus
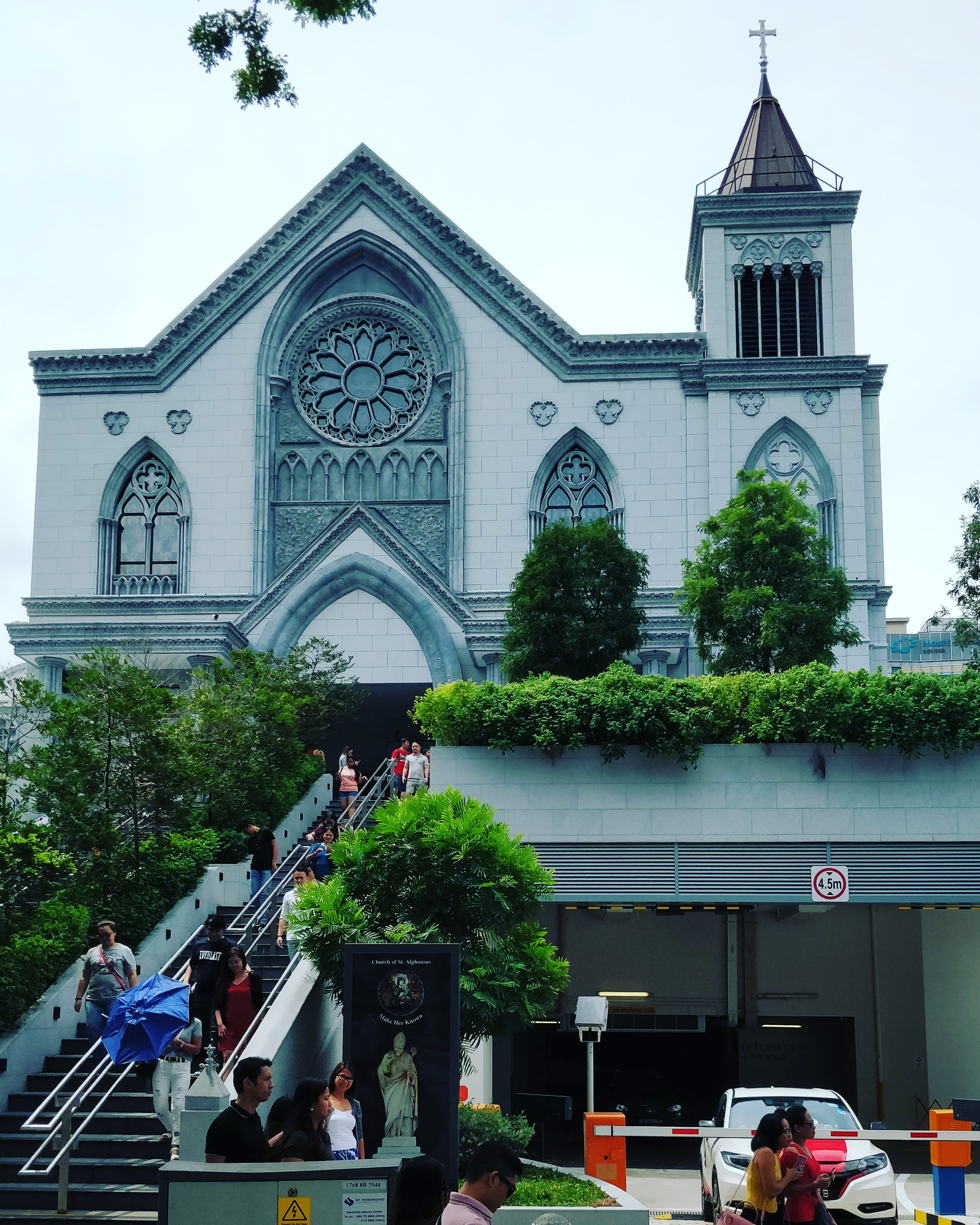
- Novena Church
- Church of Saint Alphonsus
- 1.321812°N 103.842786°E
- Location: 300 Thomson Road, Novena, Singapore
- Denomination: Roman Catholic
- Religious institute: Congregation of the Most Holy Redeemer
- Website: http://www.novenachurch.com

History
- Consecrated: 25 October 2017; 8 years ago

Architecture
- Style: new Gothic
- Completed: 1950; 76 years ago
- Construction cost: S$ 54 million

Administration
- Archdiocese: Archdiocese of Singapore
- Deanery: City District

Clergy
- Rector: Victorino A. Cueto, CSsR
- Vicar(s): Terence Wee, CSsR
- Priest(s): Peter Wee, CSsR; Simon Pereira, CSsR; Vincent Low, CSsR; Paul Pang, CSsR; Clement Lee, CSsR; Terence Wee, CSsR; Gerard Louis, CSsR; Simon Tan, CSsR Eugene Lee, CSsR, Sikstus Bapa Atawolo, CSsR

The Church of Saint Alphonsus, or Novena Church as it is more popularly known, is a Catholic church in Singapore located at 300 Thomson Road. It is not a parish church and is under the care of the Redemptorists. The name Novena Church refers to the novena prayer devotion, for which this church is famous. At the Church of Saint Alphonsus the Saturday novena services usually attract more people than the Sunday Mass services (Catholics generally go to their own parishes to attend Sunday Mass). Having popularised the novena devotion sessions in Singapore, it draws people from the entire country and beyond. The devotions gave name to the surrounding area, Novena.

== History ==
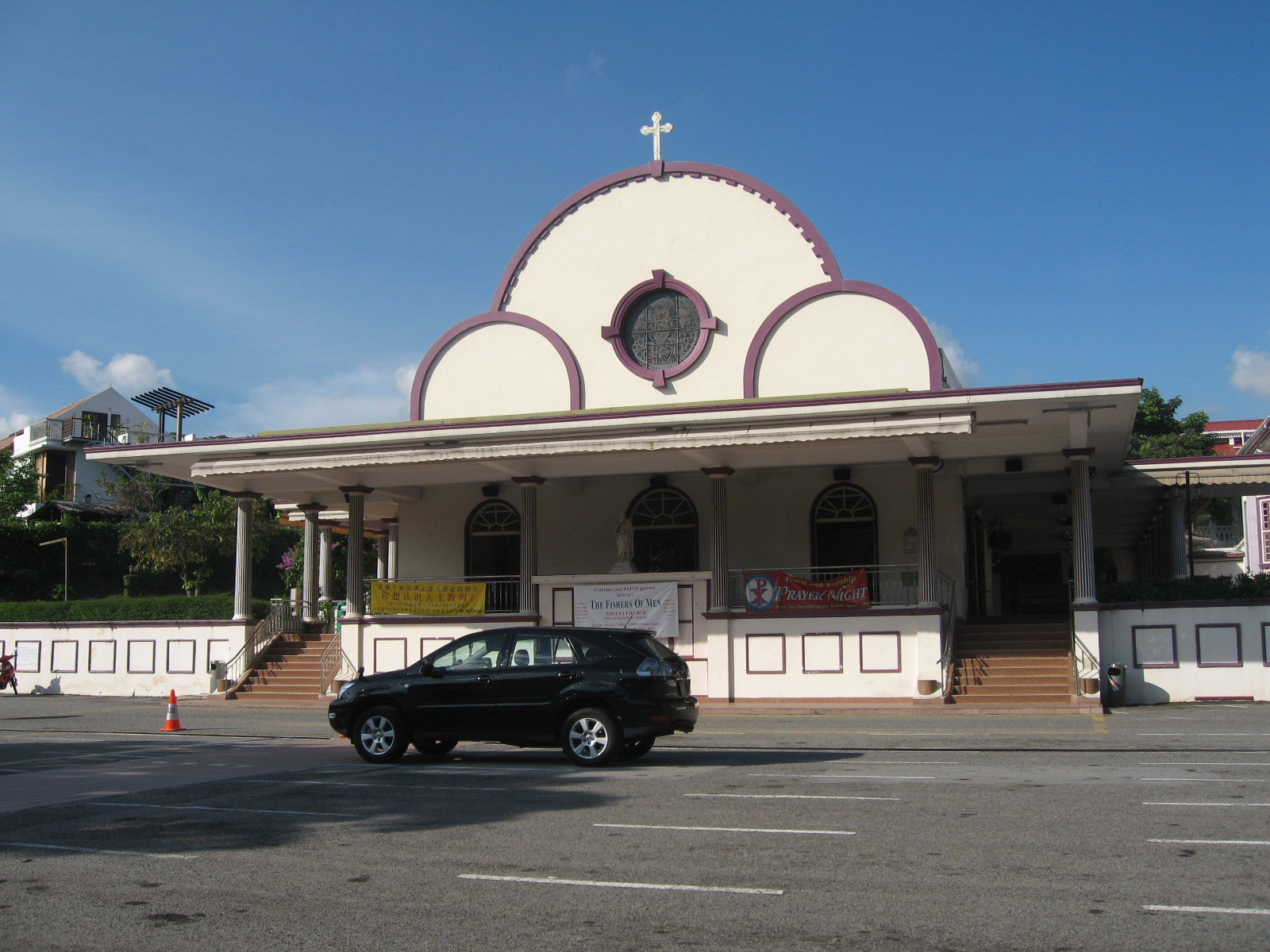
Church structure before renovations of 2011

The Church of Saint Alphonsus was founded in 1935.

The current church was built in 1950 and was designed by the architectural firm Swan and Maclaren. Porticoes were added in the late 1950s to cater to the large and growing number of devotees coming for the Saturday novena devotions. The side walls that existed earlier in the main church hall were removed and grilles added. After being closed for three years for further renovations, the church reopened on 29 September 2017.

== Novena devotions ==
The novena devotions to Our Lady of Perpetual Help is a popular novena devotion held each Saturday and which regularly draws thousands of devotees from all faiths to the Church. They were started by the Redemptorists in 1949 in a small chapel and initially saw only a handful of people attending the sessions. However, news of the devotion and reports of many answered petitions soon led to the rapid rise in the number of devotees attending. News of the devotion were mostly spread by word of mouth, but there were the few car stickers distributed by the Church with the caption "Have You Been To The Novena?". The increase in the number of devotees required the church building to be expanded and the porticoes at the sides of the main Church building were added as a result. Currently, there are 10 half-hourly sessions held each Saturday with each session drawing on average 3,000 devotees, with it not being uncommon to find a sizeable number of non-Catholics among the many devotees. The first such devotion in Mandarin Chinese was led by two Spanish Redemptorist missionaries, Juan Campos Rodríguez and Eusebio Arnáiz Álvarez.

== Annual procession ==
The annual procession was started on 21 June 1953 and it has been held every year since on the 1st Sunday of September in honour of Our Lady of Perpetual Help. It is so popular that it regularly draws devotees from all faiths and backgrounds in the tens of thousands, with there being 30,000 devotees at one point in 1970. The church celebrated its 61st Annual Procession at the present site before the church closed for redevelopment.

== Redevelopment plans ==
In 2011 it was announced that the existing Church building would undergo major renovations, with the Church being expanded in order to be able to cope with the numerous faithful that turn up for the novena devotions every Saturday. The total cost for building the New Church, the Pastoral Centre, the New Admin Block and the underground carparks was $55.4 Million (SGD). The church closed on 1 October 2014, and reopened on 29 September 2017. The Blessing and Opening of Novena Church was Celebrated by Archbishop William Goh on 25 October 2017.
