= Archdiocese of Singapore =

Latin Catholic archdiocese in Singapore

Archdiocese of Singapore Archidioecesis Singaporensis
- Cathedral of the Good Shepherd

Location
- Country: Singapore
- Metropolitan: Immediately subject to the Holy See
- Coordinates: 1.29596°N 103.85131°E

Statistics
- Area: 765 km^{2} (295 sq mi)
- Population: Total; Catholics: (as of 2020); 5,600,000; 373,000 (6.7%)
- Churches: 32
- Schools: 59

Information
- Denomination: Catholic
- Rite: Latin Rite
- Established: 18 December 1972; 53 years ago, split from Archdiocese of Malacca-Singapore
- Cathedral: Cathedral of the Good Shepherd

Current leadership
- Pope: Leo XIV
- Archbishop: William Goh Seng Chye
- Vicar General: Stephen Yim; James Yeo; Peter Zhang, CDD

Website
- catholic.sg

The Archdiocese of Singapore (Latin: Archidioecesis Singaporensis) is an exempt archdiocese of the Latin Church of the Catholic Church. Its territory includes all that is under the jurisdiction of the Republic of Singapore.

Its current archbishop is Cardinal William Goh Seng Chye. Goh took over the archdiocese on 18 May 2013, after Pope Francis accepted the resignation of his predecessor, Nicholas Chia Yeck Joo. The Cathedral of the Good Shepherd, located within the Civic District, is the cathedral church of the Archdiocese of Singapore.

As an exempt diocese, the archdiocese is not a part of an ecclesiastical province, but comes under the direct jurisdiction of the Holy See. The archdiocese is a member of the Catholic Bishops' Conference of Malaysia, Singapore and Brunei.

== History ==
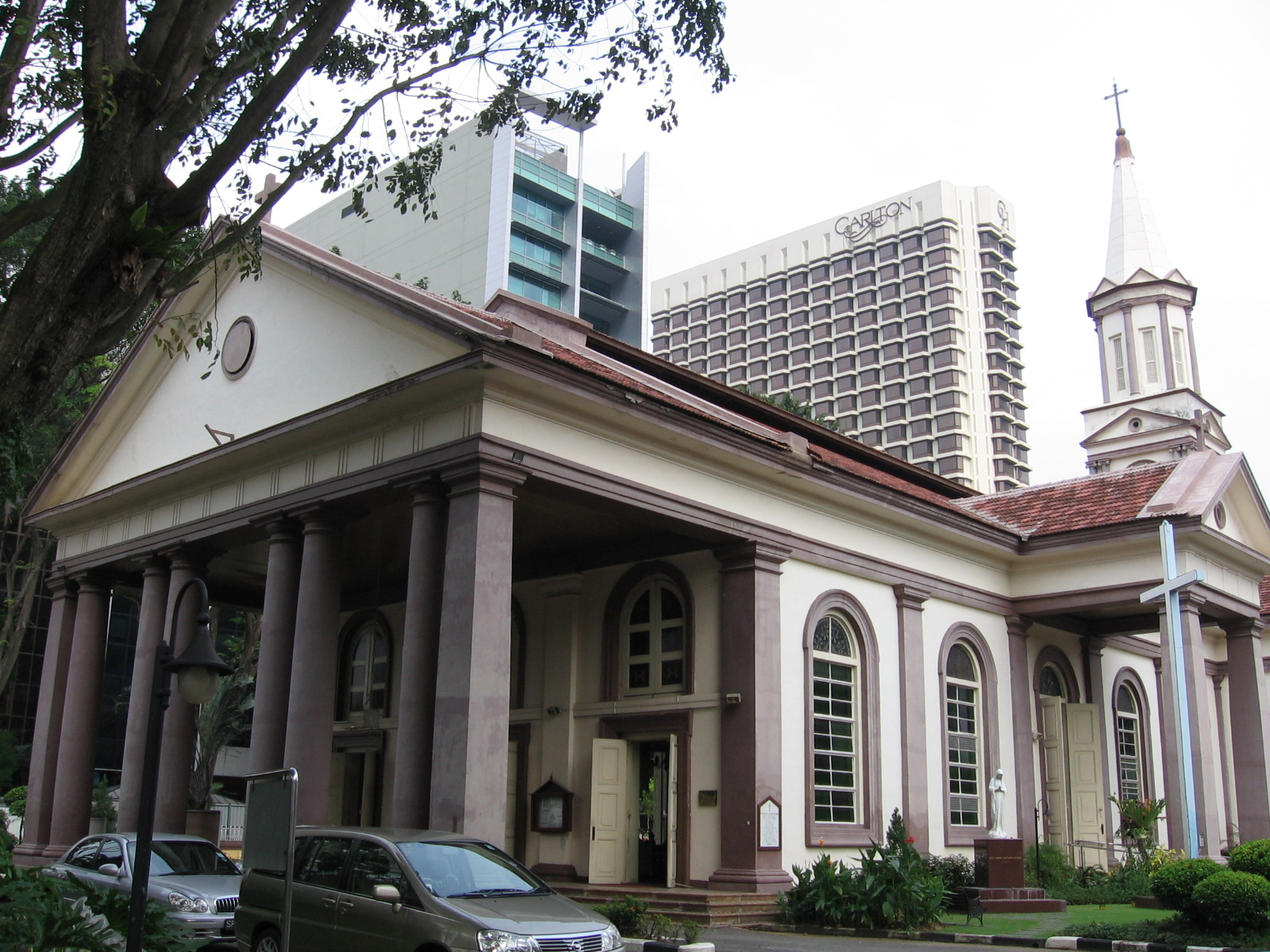
The Cathedral of the Good Shepherd before its restoration in 2006.

The Roman Catholic Church in Singapore was initially under the jurisdiction of the Diocese of Malacca, established by the papal bull pro excellenti praeeminentia issued by Pope Paul IV on 4 February 1558 as one of two new suffragan dioceses (the other being Diocese of Cochin) to the Archdiocese of Goa.

The diocese of Malacca was transferred to the Vicariate Apostolic of Ava and Pegu in 1838 and then the Vicariate Apostolic of Siam in 1840. In 1841, the church was placed under the jurisdiction of the Vicariate Apostolic of Western Siam that was erected from the Vicariate Apostolic of Siam. Initially called the Vicariate Apostolic of Western Siam, the name was changed to the Vicariate Apostolic of the Malay Peninsula and finally the Vicariate Apostolic of Malacca-Singapore.

In 1886, the Portuguese Archbishop of Goa transferred the jurisdiction over the Portuguese Missions in Singapore and Malacca to the Portuguese Bishop of Macau.

In 1888, the church was once again placed under the jurisdiction of the Diocese of Malacca when the diocese was revived, following a visit by Sultan Abu Bakar of Johor to Rome for an audience with Pope Leo XIII three years prior. The Diocese of Malacca was raised to the rank of an archdiocese in 1953. In 1955, the Archdiocese of Malacca was split and an ecclesiastical province was formed in its place comprising the Archdiocese of Malacca-Singapore as the metropolitan see and the Diocese of Kuala Lumpur and Diocese of Penang as suffragan dioceses.

In 1972, the Archdiocese of Malacca-Singapore was split into the Diocese of Malacca-Johor and the Archdiocese of Singapore with the Archdiocese of Singapore coming under the direct jurisdiction of the Holy See.

From 1838 to 1981, there was dual jurisdiction situation in Singapore, one tracing authority from the Vicariate Apostolate of Siam down to the present Archdiocese of Singapore and the other with the authority from the Portuguese Mission first from the Archdiocese of Goa and then the Diocese of Macau. This was a legacy of the padroado pronouncement in the 16th century. Dual jurisdiction was ended in 1981, when the Portuguese Mission handed over St Joseph's Church to the Archdiocese of Singapore and, thus, all of Singapore's territories was brought under the Roman Catholic Archdiocese of Singapore.

== Ordinaries ==
=== Diocese of Malacca ===
- (1558–1576) Jorge de Santa Luzia
- (1579–1601) João Ribeiro Gaio
- (1604–1612) Cristovão da Sá e Lisboa
- (1613–1632) Gonçalvo (Gonzalo) da Silva
- (1637–1638) António do Rosário
  - Sede vacante (1637–1691)
- (1691–1701) Antonio a Saint Theresia
- (1701–1738) Emmanuel a Santo Antonio
- (1738–1743) Antonio de Castro
- (1746–1748) Miguel de Bulhões e Souza
- (1748–1760 Geraldo de São José
  - Sede vacante (1760–1782)
- (1782–1785) Alexandre da Sagrada Familia Ferreira da Silva
  - Sede vacante (1785–1804)
- (1804–1815) Francisco de São Dâmaso Abreu Vieira
  - Sede vacante (1815–1838)
  - Sé suprimida (1838–1841)

=== Vicariate Apostolic of Malacca-Singapore ===
- (1841–1844) Jean-Paul-Hilaire-Michel Courvezy (Vicar Apostolic of Siam from 1834 to 1841)
- (1845–1871) Jean-Baptiste Boucho
- (1871–1877) Michel-Esther Le Turdu
- (1878–1888) Edouard Gasnier

=== Diocese of Malacca ===
- (1888–1896) Edouard Gasnier
- (1896–1904) René Michel Marie Fée
- (1904–1933) Marie-Luc-Alphonse-Emile Barillon
- (1934–1945) Adrien Pierre Devals
- (1947–1953) Michel Olçomendy

=== Archdiocese of Malacca ===
- (1953–1955) Michel Olçomendy

=== Archdiocese of Malacca-Singapore (Metropolitan See) ===
- (1955–1972) Michel Olçomendy

=== Archdiocese of Singapore ===
- (1972–1976) Michel Olçomendy
- (1977–2000) Gregory Yong Sooi Ngean
- (2001–2013) Nicholas Chia Yeck Joo
- (2013–present) Cardinal William Goh Seng Chye

== Statistics (2012) ==
- Roman Catholic population: 303,000 (including PRs, Expats and Immigrants)
- Churches: 32
- Seminary: 1
- Diocesan Priests: 71
- Religious Priests: 71
- Religious Brothers: 36
- Religious Sisters: 166
- Diocesan Seminarians: 12
- Baptisms: 3521
- Catechumens: 895
- Marriages: 977
- Charitable and Social Institutions: 18
- Educational Institutions: 54 Schools, 53,124 Students

== Key office holders ==
Following his appointment, William Goh made key appointments:

- Vicar General (Pastoral), Ambrose Vaz
- Vicar General (Administration and Religious), Peter Zhang CDD
- Chancellor, Terence Pereira
- Episcopal Vicar for the New Evangelisation, Terence Pereira
- Financial Administrator, Clement Chen

== Churches ==
The archdiocese is divided into five district deaneries covering the entire city-state of Singapore, namely the City District, East District, West District, North District and Serangoon District.

Out of the thirty-two churches, three churches in the City District are not parishes, namely the Cathedral of the Good Shepherd, Saint Joseph's Church and the Church of Saint Alphonsus.

Name	Address	Church district	Founded	Notes	Image
Cathedral of the Good Shepherd	'A' Queen Street	City	1832	Seat of the Archdiocese of Singapore	
Saint Joseph's Church (Bukit Timah)	620 Upper Bukit Timah Road	North	1846		
Saint Joseph's Church (Victoria Street)	143 Victoria Street	City	1853	Devotional church	
Church of the Nativity of the Blessed Virgin Mary	1259 Upper Serangoon Road	Serangoon	1853		
Church of Saints Peter and Paul	225A Queen Street	City	1870		
Church of Our Lady of Lourdes	50 Ophir Road	City	1888		
Church of the Sacred Heart	111 Tank Road	City	1910		
Church of Saint Teresa	510 Kampong Bahru Road	City	1929		
Church of Saint Alphonsus	300 Thomson Road	City	1935	Devotional church, also known as Novena Church	
Church of the Holy Family	6 Chapel Road	East	1935		
Church of Our Lady Star of the Sea	10 Yishun Street 22	North	1949		
Church of the Immaculate Heart of Mary	24 Highland Road	Serangoon	1953		
Church of Our Lady Queen of Peace	4 Sandy Lane	East	1954		
Church of Saint Francis Xavier	63A Chartwell Drive	Serangoon	1959		
Church of Saint Bernadette	12 Zion Road	City	1959		
Church of Saint Anthony	25 Woodlands Avenue 1	North	1960		
Church of the Holy Spirit	248 Upper Thomson Road	North	1960		
Church of Saint Ignatius	120 King's Road	West	1961		
Church of Saint Michael	17 Saint Michael's Road	City	1961		
Church of Our Lady of Perpetual Succour	31 Siglap Hill	East	1961		
Saint Anne's Church	66 Sengkang East Way	Serangoon	1963		
Church of the Blessed Sacrament	1 Commonwealth Drive	West	1965		
Church of St Mary of the Angels	5 Bukit Batok East Avenue 2	West	1970		
Church of Saint Vincent de Paul	301 Yio Chu Kang Road	Serangoon	1970		
Church of the Risen Christ	91 Toa Payoh Central	North	1971		
Church of Saint Francis of Assisi	200 Boon Lay Avenue	West	1976		
Church of Saint Stephen	30 Sallim Road	East	1978		
Church of the Holy Cross	450 Clementi Avenue 1	West	1980		
Church of Christ the King	2221 Ang Mo Kio Avenue 8	North	1982		
Church of the Holy Trinity	20 Tampines Street 11	East	1988		
Church of Divine Mercy	19 Pasir Ris Street 72	East	2010		
Church of the Transfiguration	51 Punggol Central	Serangoon	2017		
Church of Saint Jude Thaddaeus	Tengah Garden Avenue	West	2028	Under construction	

== Seminary ==
- St Francis Xavier Major Seminary

== See also ==
- Catholic education in Singapore
- Catholic Church in Singapore
- Archdiocese of Malacca-Singapore
- CHIJMES
