= Nicholas Chia =

Singaporean Roman Catholic prelate (1938–2024)

The Most Reverend Nicholas Chia
- Archbishop Emeritus of Singapore
- Chia in 2018
- See: Archdiocese of Singapore
- Installed: 7 October 2001
- Term ended: 18 May 2013
- Predecessor: Archbishop Gregory Yong
- Successor: Archbishop William Goh

Orders
- Ordination: 26 January 1964
- Consecration: 7 October 2001 by Adriano Bernardini, Yong Sooi Ngean, and Anthony Soter Fernandez

Personal details
- Born: 8 April 1938 Singapore, Straits Settlements
- Died: 17 December 2024 (aged 86) Singapore
- Buried: Cathedral of the Good Shepherd
- Denomination: Roman Catholic
- Education: Pontifical Gregorian University
- Motto: Omnia Omnibus (All things to all men) — 1 Cor 9:22
- Styles
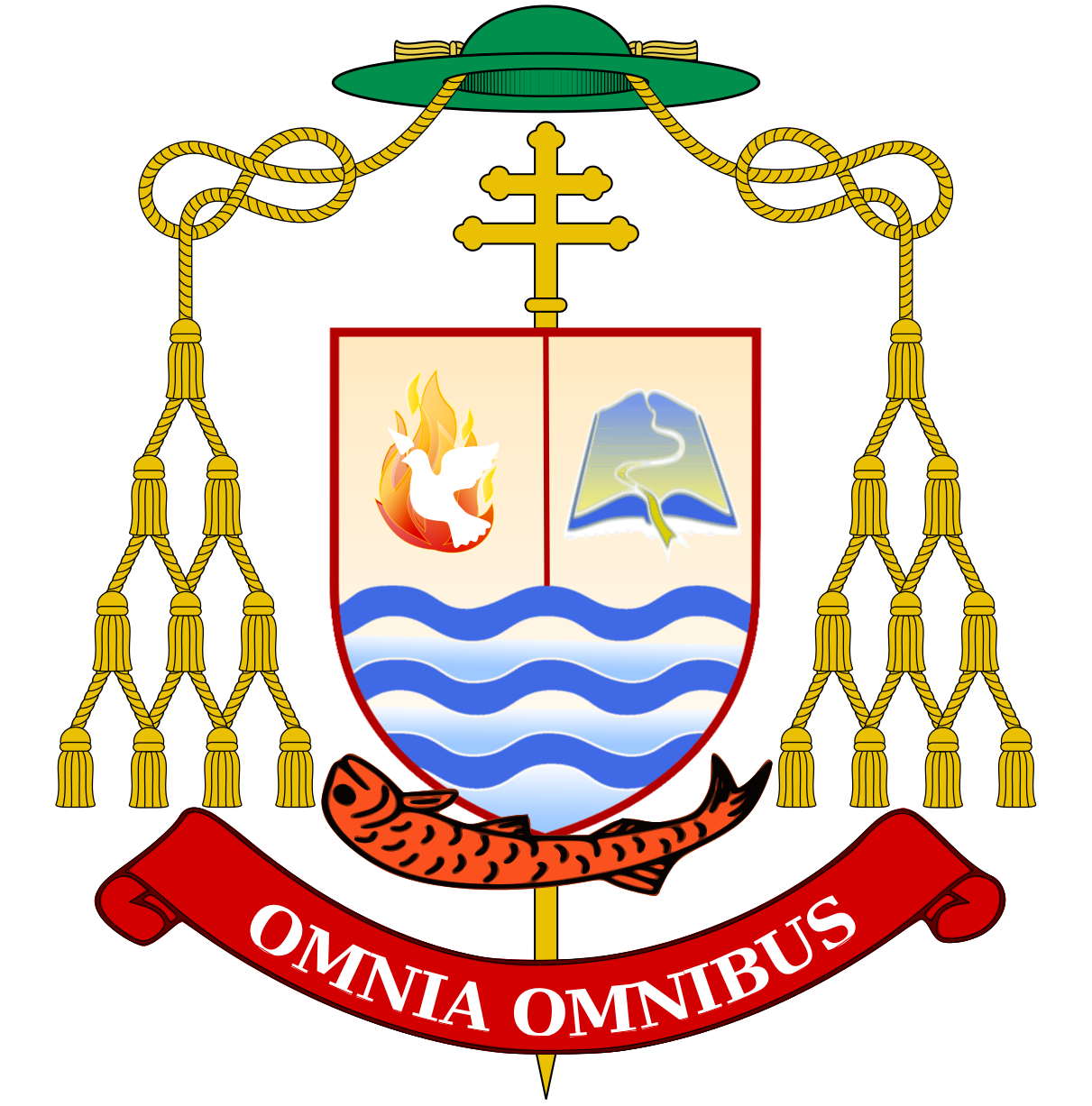
- Reference style: The Most Reverend
- Spoken style: His Grace
- Religious style: Archbishop-Emeritus

Nicholas Gerald Chia Yeck Joo (Note: simplified Chinese: 谢益裕; traditional Chinese: 謝益裕; pinyin: Xiè Yìyù) (8 April 1938 – 17 December 2024) was a Singaporean Roman Catholic prelate who was the third Archbishop of Singapore and the first Singapore-born clergyman to hold the office.

On 7 October 2001, Chia was ordained as Archbishop of Singapore. He officially retired as Archbishop of Singapore on 18 May 2013, and was succeeded by Archbishop William Goh.

== Early life and education ==
Chia was born in Singapore on 8 April 1938 to Catholic parents, a secretary and a housewife. He was the fourth child in a family of four boys and two girls. He completed his secondary education at Holy Innocents English School, and thereafter started his training to be a priest. He attended the St Francis Xavier's minor seminary for three years, and then Penang's major seminary between 1955 through 1963. He continued with his theological studies at the Pontifical Gregorian University in Rome from 1969 to 1971. After graduating in moral theology from university, he stayed on in Rome for another year to do comparative studies of religions.

== Career ==
=== Priesthood ===
After Chia returned from Rome, he became a lecturer at the Penang seminary from 1973 to 1977 and, until 1996, he was also an external lecturer on moral theology at the seminary in Singapore. In 1978, Chia founded Singapore Archdiocese's Pastoral Institute and remained its director until 1990.

Upon returning to Singapore, Chia was an assistant priest at Saints Peter and Paul Church, and at Our Lady of Perpetual Succour Church. He was the first parish priest at the Church of Holy Cross in Clementi from 1980 till his appointment as Archbishop in 2001. He was also the chaplain to Catholic students in the National University of Singapore since 1990.

Since 1995, Chia was also the Chancellor and Procurator of the archdiocese, taking on the responsibility of the diocesan documentation and finances respectively.

=== Archbishop of Singapore ===
When Archbishop Gregory Yong retired, Pope John Paul II appointed Chia to the office in May 2001 after a seven-month long selection process. Chia received his episcopal consecration on 7 October 2001 at the Singapore Indoor Stadium, with Archbishop Adriano Bernardini, the Vatican's ambassador to Singapore officiating the ceremony and in presence of 12,000 attendees. It was the first ordination of an archbishop in 50 years as Yong was appointed in Penang in 1977 before taking over the Singapore diocese from Archbishop Michel Olçomendy. Olcomendy had his ordination in Singapore in 1947.

On 18 October 2001, Chia would pledge S$100,000 (2001) (US$55,812.21) from the diocese to aid Afghan refugees displaced through the War in Afghanistan started in 2001 by United States in response to the September 11 attacks. On 23 December, Chia ordered a reshuffle of priests in the parishes, with 33 priests being either promoted or transferred into other parishes or offices in an effort to renew the Church with most of the appointments taking effect by February 2003. Before this order, transfers or appointments would be conducted on an ad-hoc basis. On 27 December, Chia together with Mufti of Singapore, Syed Isa Semait and Islamic Religious Council of Singapore's president, Maarof Salleh would attend a dinner celebrating Hari Raya Puasa and Christmas with the community to promote inter-faith understanding, against the backdrop of the ongoing war on terror as well as the recent arrests of agents of Jemaah Islamiyah, a Southeast Asian Islamist militant group in Singapore.

During the 2002–2004 SARS outbreak in Singapore, to limit the spread of the virus, Chia ordered a temporary suspension of having individual confession in the confessional in April 2003 and that the priests would grant "general absolution" instead and Catholics may approach priests to confess in other locations as such the priests' offices.

In the same month, Joachim Kang, a priest at Church of St. Teresa before being transferred to Church of the Holy Trinity in the reshuffle this year, was arrested by Commercial Affairs Department after being investigated for criminal breach of trust, of which he was charged with 19 counts of embezzling from the Church of St. Teresa totalling S$5.1 million (2003) (US$2.93 million) between July 1994 and February 2003. Chia testified against Kang during the trial, but wrote a letter to the judge to appeal for a lighter sentence. Kang would eventually be jailed in 2004 for 7.5 years, but was not defrocked pending further counselling and assessment. Kang would eventually repay the misappropriated money after selling off the properties he had acquired with the funds. After Kang was released in 2009 on a home detention scheme, Kang was restored as a priest after it was determined that he was repentant.

As a continuation of the reshuffle announced in 2001 and in light of the embezzlement case, Chia introduced new guidelines in 2004 for all Catholic churches which include the requirement of having a financial council at each church to advise the parish priests on administering church funds and assets, and an accountant to keep its books. Banks and financial institutions would also now accept instructions only from the Archbishop on parish accounts. Any cheques over $5,000 now require two signatures, and churches would only have S$10,000 (2003) (US$5,739.92) kept each month for operational expenses. A revised directory of canon laws, Priests' Directory (Note: The Priests' Directory was first introduced in 1986 and then revised in 1995.) that govern lives and work of priests was being worked on as well.

On 2 May 2009, after a group of conservative Christian women took over the leadership of Association of Women for Action and Research, Chia instructed that the Catholic priests should not comment on the event as secular organisations should remain secular, echoing the position stated by Anglican Archbishop John Chew and other religious leaders of Buddhist, Taoist, and Protestant bodies.

In 2012, the Catholic Church would put a 30-year limit on all niche allocations in its columbaria due to the scarcity of land and space available. In the same year, it was reported that Chia had written two private letters to Function 8, a civic group supporting an event held in June by the latter against the Internal Security Act. Chia however had withdrawn the letters after political activist Alex Au wrote about the letters as he was concerned that the letters would not be used in a manner he had intended, and was not willing to let the Church and the office of Archbishop be dragged into a political game and affect the country's social harmony.

On 31 December 2012, it was announced that Chia would be succeeded by William Goh, rector of the St Francis Xavier Major Seminary. Goh was appointed by Pope Benedict XVI after a secret ballot among the Singapore priests. Chia reached the retirement age of 75 in 2013 and submitted his resignation to the Holy See. His resignation was accepted by Pope Benedict XVI on 18 May 2013.

== Personal life ==
In February 2014, he sustained head injuries in a bad fall and was in a coma for more than a month. As he did not recover fully from his injuries, he continued to be cared for in one of Singapore's Catholic nursing homes.

On 7 April 2018, Archbishop William Goh presided over a celebratory Mass in the Church of the Holy Cross to mark Chia's 80th Birthday.

On 17 December 2024, the Archbishop's Communications Office announced that Chia was critically ill. He died later that day, at St Theresa's Home, where he had been residing. He was 86. On 18 January 2025, his remains were placed in the crypt of the Cathedral of the Good Shepherd.

== See also ==
- Archdiocese of Singapore
- Cathedral of the Good Shepherd

== Notes ==
Catholic Church titles
Preceded by Gregory Yong Sooi Ngean	Archbishop of Singapore; 2001–2013	Succeeded by William Goh Seng Chye
