= William Goh =

Singaporean cardinal (born 1957)

His Eminence William Goh Seng Chye
- Cardinal, Archbishop of Singapore; Vice President of the Catholic Bishops' Conference of Malaysia, Singapore and Brunei
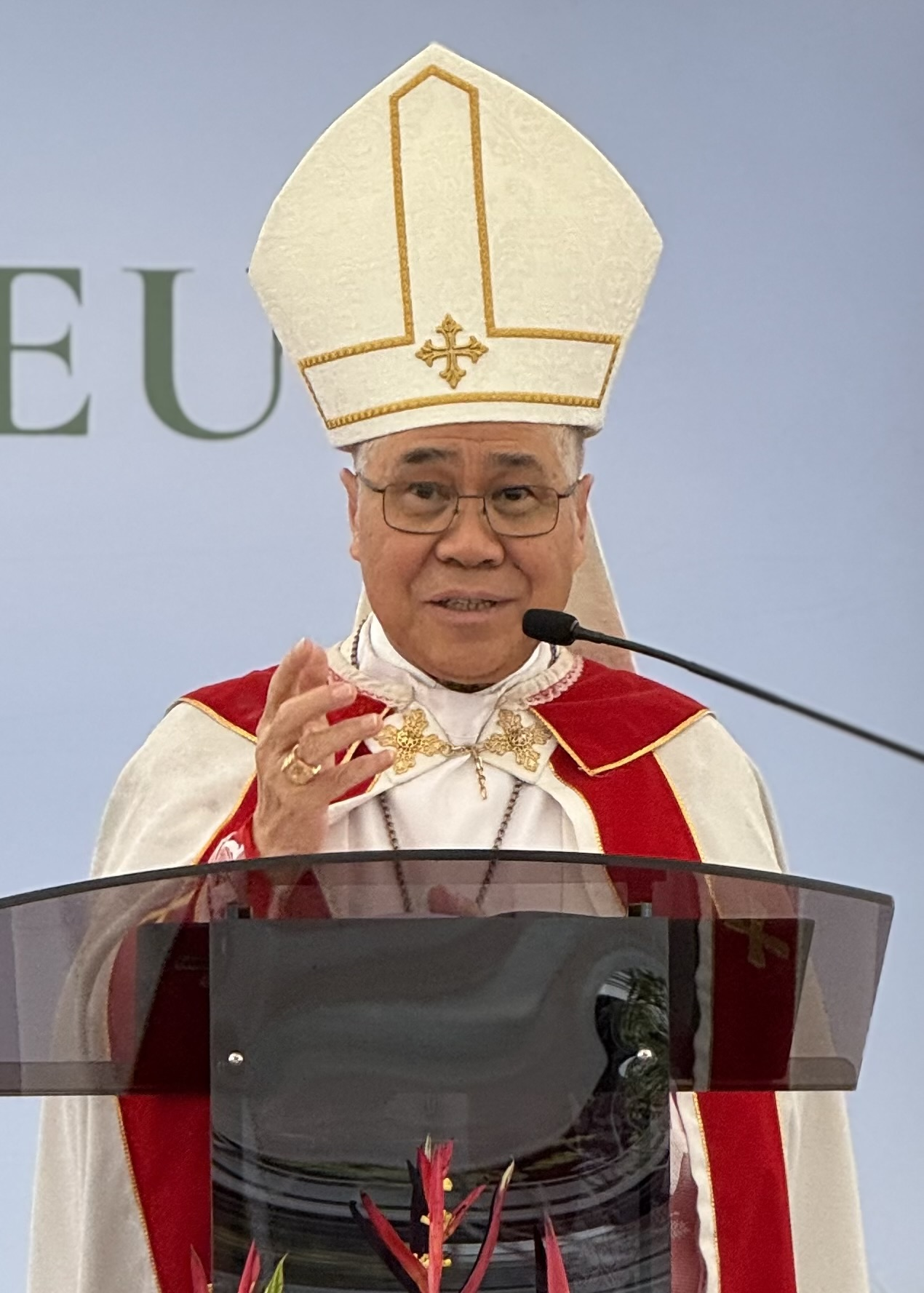
- Goh in 2025
- Archdiocese: Singapore
- See: Singapore
- In office: 18 May 2013
- Predecessor: Nicholas Chia Yeck Joo
- Other posts: Cardinal priest of Santa Maria "Regina Pacis" in Ostia mare (2022–present), Spiritual Director of Singapore Archdiocesan Catholic Charismatic Renewal Experience (2005–2026)
- Previous posts: Coadjutor Archbishop of Singapore (2012–2013); Rector of St Francis Xavier Major Seminary (2005–2013)

Orders
- Ordination: 1 May 1985 by Gregory Yong Sooi Ngean
- Consecration: 22 February 2013 by Leopoldo Girelli, Nicholas Chia, Murphy Pakiam
- Created cardinal: 27 August 2022 by Pope Francis
- Rank: Cardinal priest

Personal details
- Born: William Goh Seng Chye; 25 June 1957 (age 69) Colony of Singapore
- Denomination: Roman Catholic
- Residence: Cathedral of the Good Shepherd
- Education: College General; Pontifical Urbaniana University; Pontifical Gregorian University
- Motto: Ut vivant (Latin for 'That they may live') —John 10:10-11
- Styles
- Reference style: His Eminence
- Spoken style: Your Eminence
- Religious style: Cardinal
- Informal style: Cardinal

William Goh Seng Chye (Note: Chinese: 吴成才; pinyin: Wú Chéngcái) (born 25 June 1957) is a Singaporean prelate of the Catholic Church who has been serving as the fourth Archbishop of Singapore since 2013. He was made a cardinal by Pope Francis on 27 August 2022.

== Early life and education ==
Born in Singapore, Goh attended Montfort Junior School and Montfort Secondary School in Hougang, where he lived. He furthered his studies in philosophy at the Major Seminary (College General) and did his theological studies at the Major Seminary in Singapore. Goh is from the first cohort of seminarians to graduate from the newly built St Francis Xavier Major Seminary in Punggol.

== Career ==
=== Priesthood ===
After his graduation, he was posted to the Church of the Holy Cross where he served as an assistant priest to Nicholas Chia. In 1985, he received a Bachelor of Theology from the Pontifical Urbaniana University in Rome. He was ordained a priest on 1 May 1985 by Gregory Yong, Archbishop of Singapore, at the Church of the Holy Family. Goh continued his studies in Rome, receiving a licentiate in dogmatic theology from the Pontifical Gregorian University.

Returning to Singapore, he was posted as a Resident Formator and Initiation Year Director at the Major Seminary and lecturer in systematic theology. In 1992, he was appointed the parish priest of St Anne's Church as well. In 1995, Goh became a member of the Theological Advisory Commission of the Federation of Asian Bishops' Conferences. He became Dean of Studies at the major seminary, then procurator, and finally rector of Major Seminary, where he remained. Goh was the spiritual director of the Archdiocesan Catholic Spirituality Centre, Amplify Youth Ministry, Jesus Youth Singapore, and the Catholic Charismatic Renewal Experience.

=== Coadjutor archbishop ===
On 29 December 2012, Pope Benedict XVI appointed Goh coadjutor archbishop of Singapore. He received his episcopal consecration on 22 February 2013 from the Apostolic Nuncio to the Republic of Singapore Leopoldo Girelli and co-consecrators Nicholas Chia and Murphy Pakiam. His consecration was attended by the President of Singapore, Tony Tan Keng Yam, Deputy Prime Minister Teo Chee Hean, Chief Justice of Singapore Sundaresh Menon, state dignitaries, twenty bishops, more than 170 priests and an estimated 14,000 Roman Catholics, together with representatives of the major religions in Singapore. In a letter to Goh, Prime Minister Lee Hsien Loong said that the Singaporean Government has always enjoyed a "close and cooperative relations" with the Catholic Archdiocese of Singapore and hoped to continue and strengthen the good relations with the future archbishop.

The day after his episcopal ordination, Goh hosted a reception at the Catholic Spirituality Centre. Prime Minister Lee Hsien Loong and his wife were among the guests. Invited guests also included Chief Justice Sundaresh Menon, Members of Parliament, and members of the Inter-Religious Organisations (IROs).

Goh addressed the issue of secularism saying: "The greatest concern of the Church today is simply this - that the world is becoming too secularised. In itself it is not wrong. It is when secularisation becomes secularism - that is to say anti-Church and anti-religion. And so without religion, without faith in the absolute, because God is the absolute, then we don't have an objective foundation for moral values ... As a result, people are divided, people are fragmented, because it is all based on relativism, which simply means to say, it is up to each one to think. How can we build a united society when we don't have a reference point, a basis for unity?"

Goh also said that the Church is concerned with the common good of society such as justice, harmony and progress and will continue to work with the government to achieve these common good for society. He added that the Church recognises that the just ordering of society is the responsibility and purview of the State, and that the Church cannot take over the role of the government, nor impose its values on believers of other faiths. When asked what was his first priority as Archbishop of Singapore, he said it was to engage the youths of Singapore as they are "vibrant, creative and full of energy". He added that he would like to meet them to understand their aspirations and how they can contribute to the growth of the Roman Catholic Church.

Goh also pledged to re-examine the structure of the Church and make it more effective and efficient so that there will be more communication and understanding within the Church so that the Church may operate and work in unity and peace.

=== Archbishop ===
Goh became archbishop on 18 May 2013 when Pope Francis accepted the resignation of his predecessor Archbishop Nicholas Chia. He is the second Singapore-born clergyman to hold the office of archbishop. A press release from his office stated that one of his first tasks was to "strengthen the fraternal bonds in the Presbyterium and harness the charisms and passion of his brother priests" so that they can empower the laity to be "co-responsible in the mission of the Church". He also announced a new line-up of key office holders. An installation service followed on 24 May.

In 2014, Goh was appointed a member of the Presidential Council for Religious Harmony. In 2015, Goh was appointed a member of the Presidential Council for Minority Rights.

=== Cardinal ===
On 29 May 2022, Pope Francis announced he planned to make Goh a cardinal at a consistory scheduled for 27 August. On 27 August, Pope Francis made him a cardinal priest, assigning him the title of Santa Maria Regina Pacis a Ostia Lido. Goh is the first cardinal from Singapore.

In 2023, he was elected as the Vice President of the Catholic Bishops' Conference of Malaysia, Singapore and Brunei.

He participated as a cardinal elector in the 2025 papal conclave that elected Pope Leo XIV.

== See also ==
- Cardinals created by Pope Francis

== Notes ==
Preceded by Nicholas Gerald Chia Yeck Joo	Archbishop of Singapore; 2013-	Succeeded by Incumbent
Preceded by Laurent Monsengwo Pasinya	Cardinal-Priest of Santa Maria Regina Pacis a Ostia Lido; 27 August 2022 – present	Incumbent
Preceded by Cornelius Sim	General Secretary of the Catholic Bishops' Conference of Malaysia, Singapore and Brunei; 2017–2018	Succeeded by Richard Ng
Preceded by Cornelius Sim	Vice-President of the Catholic Bishops' Conference of Malaysia, Singapore and Brunei; 2021-	Incumbent
