= Gregory Yong =

Archbishop of Singapore

His Excellency Gregory Yong Sooi Ngean
- Archbishop of Singapore
- See: Archdiocese of Singapore
- Installed: 3 February 1977
- Term ended: 14 October 2000
- Predecessor: Archbishop Michel Olçomendy
- Successor: Archbishop Nicholas Chia D.D.

Personal details
- Born: 20 May 1925 Taiping, Malaysia (then the Federated Malay States)
- Died: 28 June 2008 (aged 83) Singapore
- Denomination: Roman Catholic

Chinese name
- Traditional Chinese: 楊瑞元
- Simplified Chinese: 杨瑞元
- Pha̍k-fa-sṳ: Yòng Sui-ngèn

Gregory Yong Sooi Ngean (20 May 1925 – 28 June 2008) was a Singaporean Catholic prelate who served as Archbishop of Singapore from 1977 to 2000.

== Early life ==
Yong was born into a Malaysian Chinese family of Hakka descent in Taiping, and received his education in St. George's Institution in Taiping as well as St. Michael's Institution in Ipoh, Malaya. He was an exceptional boy, and liked to role-play as a priest and pretend to say mass in his games.

== Priesthood ==
In January 1941, Yong entered the Minor seminary and in 1944 graduated to the Major Seminary. He was officially ordained in 1951 and posted to the Church of the Nativity of the Blessed Virgin Mary in Singapore. In 1953, Yong left for studies in Rome where he was conferred a Doctorate in Canon Law, the very first local priest to achieve the distinction.

Back in Singapore in 1956, he was sent as assistant Parish Priest to the Church of the Sacred Heart. In the following year, he joined the teaching staff of the Minor Seminary. After a short stint as assistant Parish Priest at the Church of the Immaculate Heart of Mary, he was appointed to a teaching position in the Major Seminary, again, the very first local priest to be thus honoured.

=== Bishop of Penang ===
On 1 July 1968, Yong was consecrated Bishop, and took over the Diocese Of Penang from Bishop Francis Chan who had died on 27 October 1967.

=== Archbishop of Singapore ===
On 3 February 1977, Yong was appointed to succeed Archbishop Michel Olçomendy as the first of the local clergy to lead the Church in Singapore. On 2 April 1977, he was officially installed as the Roman Catholic Archbishop of Singapore. He was the second Archbishop of the Archdiocese of Singapore.

In August 1992, Yong served on the first Presidential Council for Religious Harmony as a representative of the Roman Catholics in Singapore.

Yong retired on 14 October 2000 as he reached the mandatory retirement age for archbishop. Archbishop Nicholas Chia succeeded him as the Archbishop of the Archdiocese of Singapore.

== Personal life ==
Yong's last public appearance was in May 2004, when he was summoned as a prosecution witness in the trial of Catholic priest Joachim Kang, who was convicted and jailed for misappropriation of S$5.1 million in church funds. During the court appearances, Yong appeared to be frail and needed help walking and occasional breaks during his testimonies. In spite of his poor health, he made light of his ailment when the prosecutor asked if he needed a break. 'I'm okay and can carry on,' he replied, and then asked the judge if she was all right too, sparking laughter in the courtroom.

In 2004, Yong became critically ill and had a heart attack in June. He was then admitted to Mount Elizabeth Hospital for diabetes and pneumonia.

Yong died on 28 June 2008 at St Joseph's Home, Singapore of a heart failure.

== See also ==
- Archdiocese of Singapore
- Cathedral of the Good Shepherd

Catholic Church titles
Preceded by Francis Chan	Bishop of Penang; 1968–1977	Succeeded by Anthony Soter Fernandez
Preceded by Michel Olçomendy	Archbishop of Singapore; 1977–2000	Succeeded by Nicholas Chia
