= Church of the Holy Family, Singapore =

Church of the Holy Family
- Church of the Holy Family
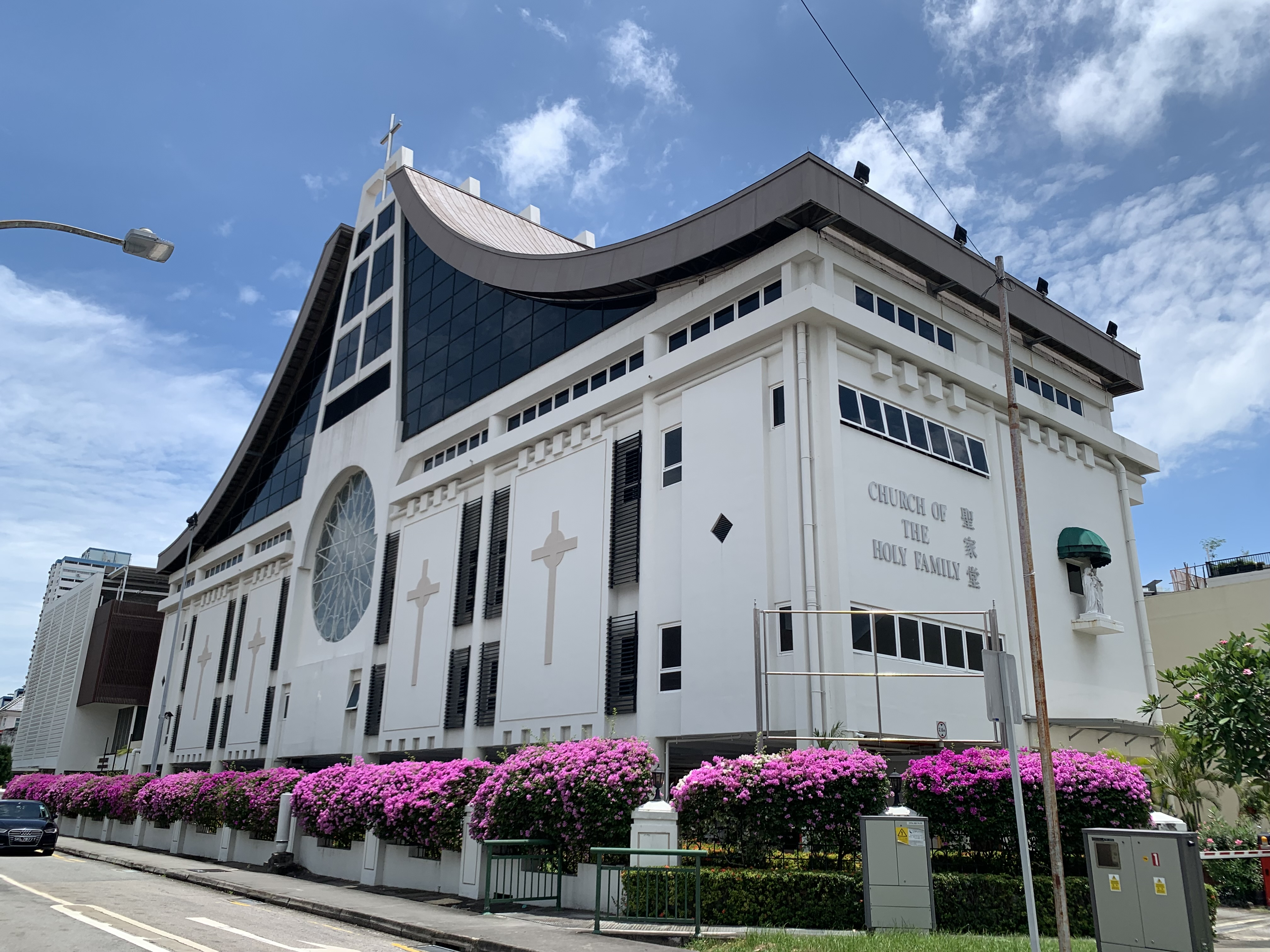
- The Church building on the Chapel Road
- Church of the Holy Family
- 1°18′24.75″N 103°54′24.25″E
- Country: Singapore
- Denomination: Catholic
- Churchmanship: Roman Rite
- Website: catholic.org.sg www.holyfamily.org.sg

History
- Former name: Chapel of the Holy Family (1923–1931)
- Status: Parish church
- Founded: 1902
- Dedication: Holy Family
- Dedicated: 1923-11-11
- Consecrated: 1932

Architecture
- Functional status: Active
- Style: Modern
- Completed: 1999

Specifications
- Capacity: 3,000 (2,400 seated, 600 standing)
- Materials: Concrete

Administration
- Division: East District
- Diocese: Archdiocese of Singapore

Clergy
- Priest: Rev. Fr. Adrian Yeo Rev. Fr. Robertus Sarwiseso Rev. Fr. Joobesh Mannakulathil Rev. Deacon Clement Chen

The Church of the Holy Family, also known as Holy Family Church and Katong Catholic Church, is a Catholic church in the Archdiocese of Singapore. It is located at Chapel Road, off East Coast Road, and has one of the largest parish populations in the archdiocese.

== History ==
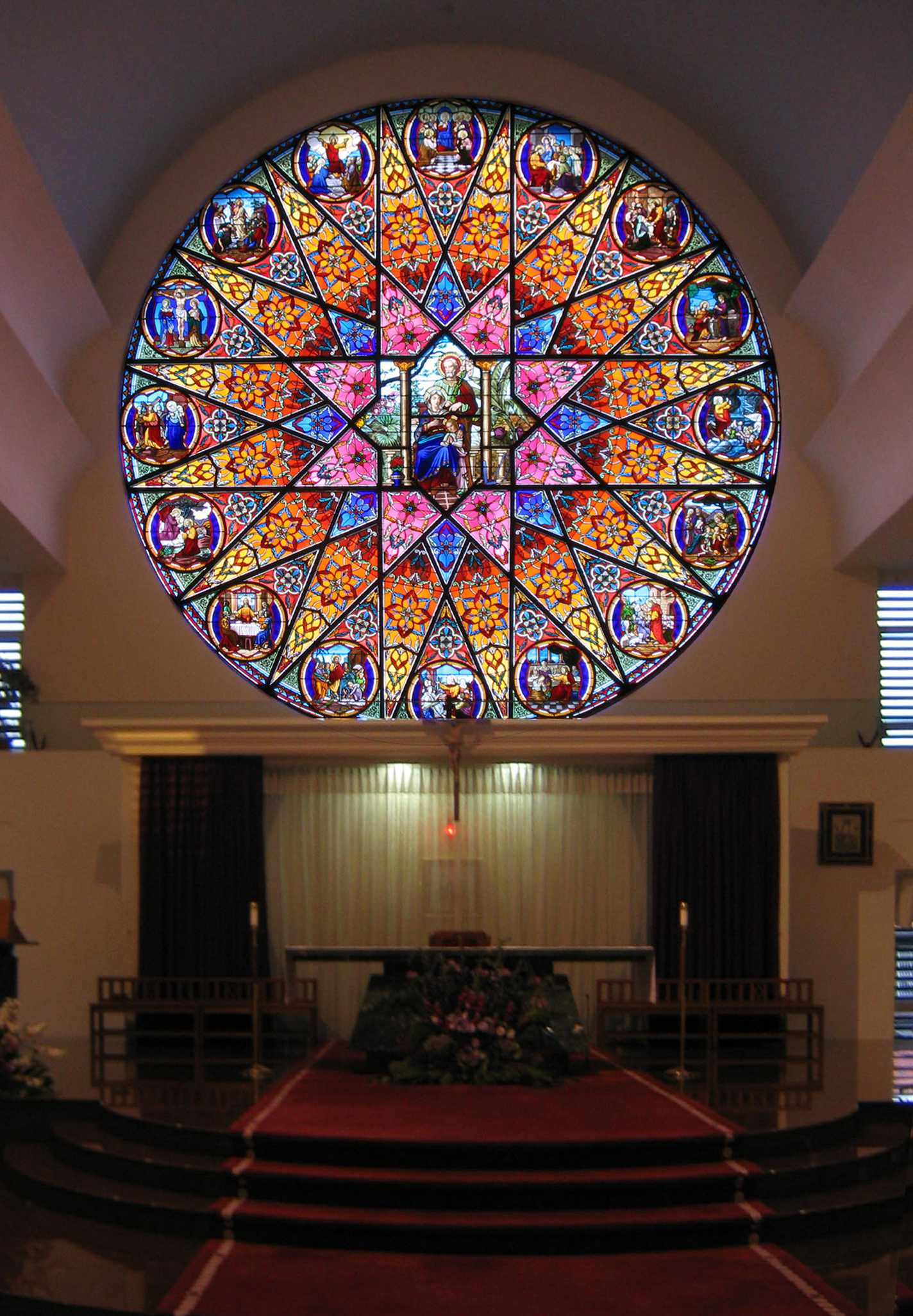
Rose Radiant of the Church of the Holy Family by Joël Mône and Vitrail Saint-Georges

The church itself was founded in early 1902 by four Eurasian families living in Tanjong Katong. They purchased plots of land in the area, as did Mr James Leonard Scheerder, who developed a coconut plantation around Marine Parade, Chapel Road and East Coast Road. The De La Salle Brothers also bought a plot of land in the area, and is now occupied by St. Patrick's School. Mass was celebrated during the holidays in the buildings they owned along the East Coast, now developed into East Coast Park.

The beginnings of its actual structure only came about shortly after World War I, when Reverend Father Pierre Raudel, the then-parish priest of the Cathedral of the Good Shepherd, approached Scheerder for the donation of some land in Katong to build a chapel for the growing Catholic community in the area. Mr Scheerder conceded to the request on the condition that the land was to be used for the chapel and to be returned to the donor's estate if it were not used by the chapel. Regardless, in 1922, the foundation stone of the chapel was laid. The chapel was completed and consecrated to the Holy Family by Bishop Marie-Luc-Alphonse-Emile Barillon on 11 November 1923. As the growing Catholic community had outgrown the small chapel, the chapel building was demolished in 1931, and while waiting for a new church building to be built, the community conducted their Sunday Mass in Arcadia Cinema.

The full-sized Church of the Holy Family was eventually completed on 19 June 1932. It was blessed and consecrated by Bishop Perrichon. By 1936, the church was made a parish, its first parish priest being Pierre Ruaudel. In 1969, to better accommodate and service the increasing number of Catholics in the area, the church again underwent renovation and extension work which was completed by April 1970. The church hall featured a single large crucifix on a blank wall behind the altar, and this set-up was often decorated with paints, banners and other artwork, changing to appropriately suit the missal theme of the week. David Saul Marshall donated a piece of land to the church, but too late to build an extension upon, and so was then used as a carpark.

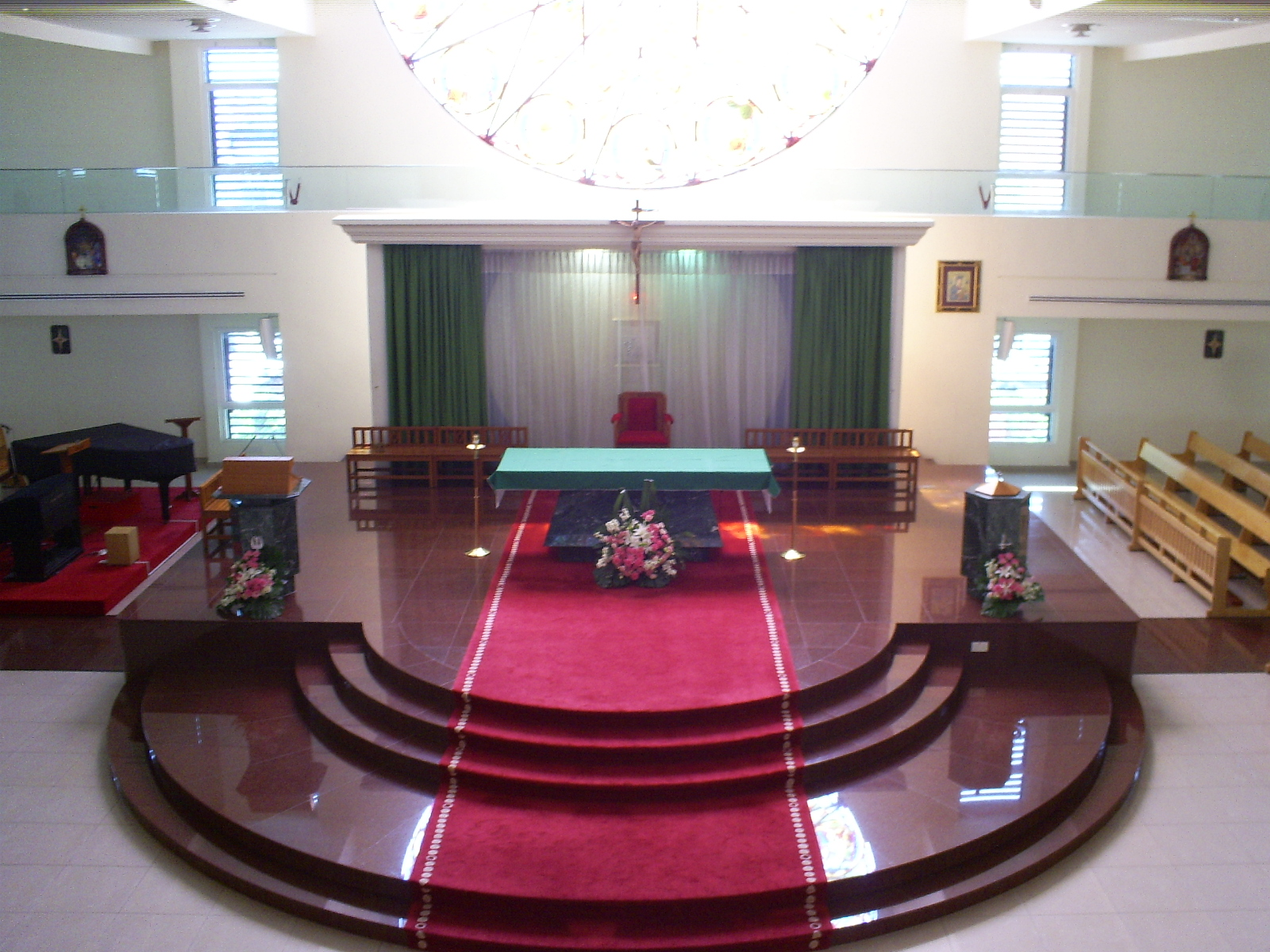
The altar of the new Church of the Holy Family as seen from the third level of church building (also the second level of the church hall).

Eventually, the increasing numbers of worshippers again outgrew the church. Thus, it was again demolished on 29 December 1997 to make way for the current, larger, 4-storey church building led by the then parish priest Rev. Fr. Anthony Ho. During this time, Sunday Masses were celebrated in the main hall of Saint Patrick's School while the Weekday masses are held in the school chapel. The new church was completed and consecrated in December 1999, just prior to the start of the second millennium. The car park is on the first floor has space for nearly 200 cars, although this is usually insufficient during most weekend sunset masses, forcing other parishioners to park on roadside. The church hall situated on the second and third storey and accommodates about 3,000 people (2,400 seated, 600 standing), although main masses of days of obligation usually pack the church hall with more parishioners. The centrepiece is the altar with a massive 16-panel stained glass above, depicting the Holy Family and 16 scenes from Jesus' life. The fourth storey houses the Holy Family Kindergarten, four classrooms, a choir room, and a large function room that can accommodate a few hundred people, serving as the canteen on Sundays. The Adoration Room and Our Lady's Grotto are located on the ground floor, and there is also a 2500-niche air-conditioned columbarium located in the basement. The roof of the church is shaped to simulate hands in prayer, pointing toward heaven. Apart from the main church building, there are also other buildings within the parish compound: the Fathers' House, Emmaus Centre and a third building simply called 3 Sea Avenue. 3 Sea Avenue was donated by a parishioner after his death, as he had stated in his will to pass the deed of the building to the church. Both the Fathers' House and 3 Sea Avenue were later demolished in 2018 and rebuilt, with the former (now a much larger Annex building) currently designated as the Holy Family Pastoral Centre (which opened in late 2020) and other currently serving as the Church's office. Moreover, the Katong Catholic Book Centre (formerly at East Coast Road outside the Church) have also moved to within the compounds of the Church.

== Organisation ==
The church currently has 3 priests administering to a parish population of 8,500. These priests are:

- Parish Priest Reverend Adrian Yeo
- Reverend Father Robertus Sarwiseso, CICM
- Reverend Father Joobesh Mannakulathil
- Reverend Deacon Clement Chen

The church has the following ministries:

- Formation Ministry
- Liturgy Ministry
- Youth Council
- Service Ministry
- Legion of Mary
- Missionary Ministry
- Neighbourhood Small Christian Communities (SCC)

== Gallery ==
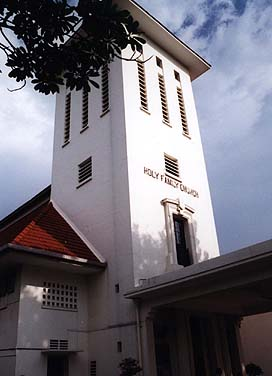
Old Holy Family Church as seen from the main entrance.

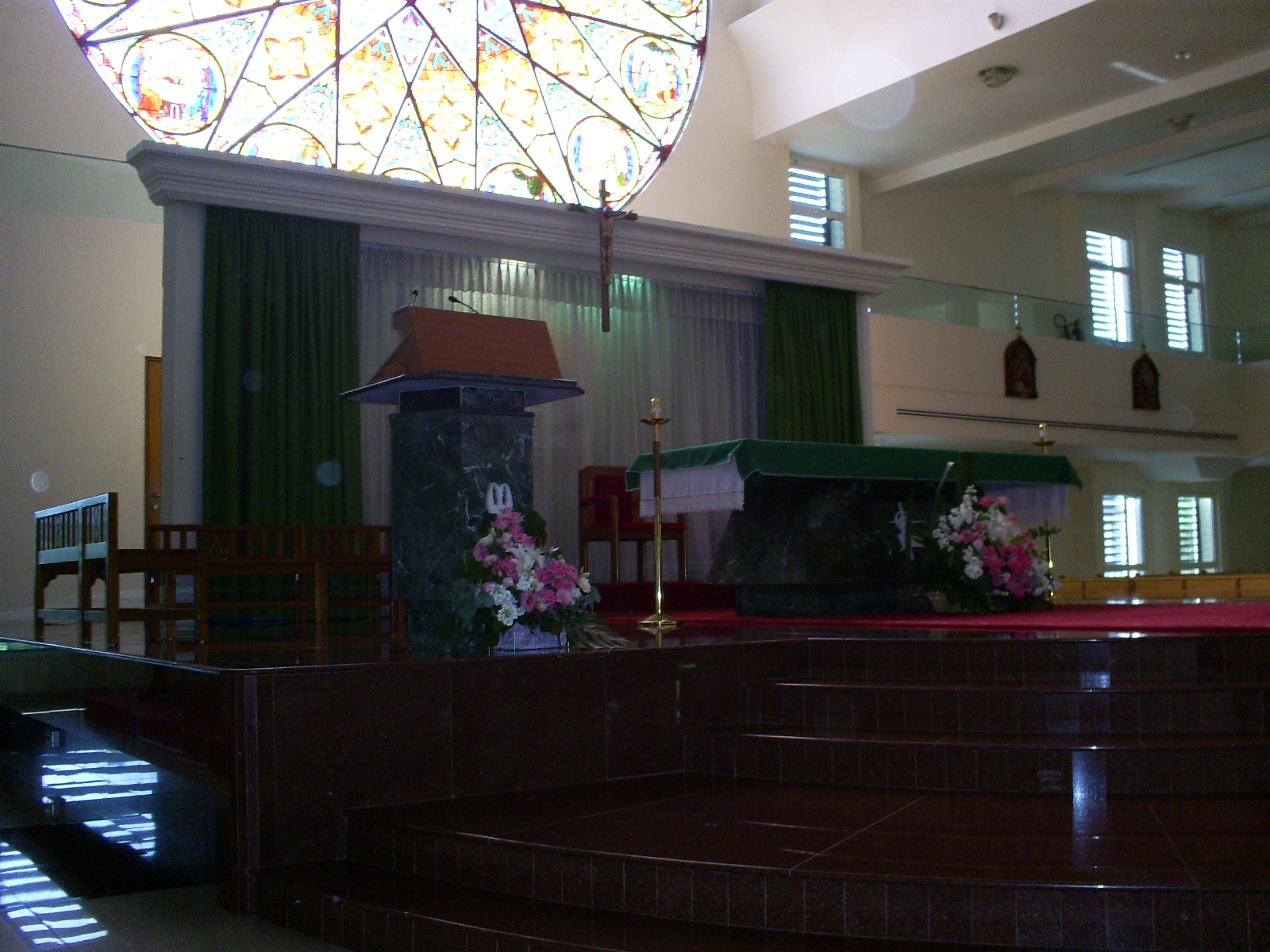
View of the altar from the northwest.

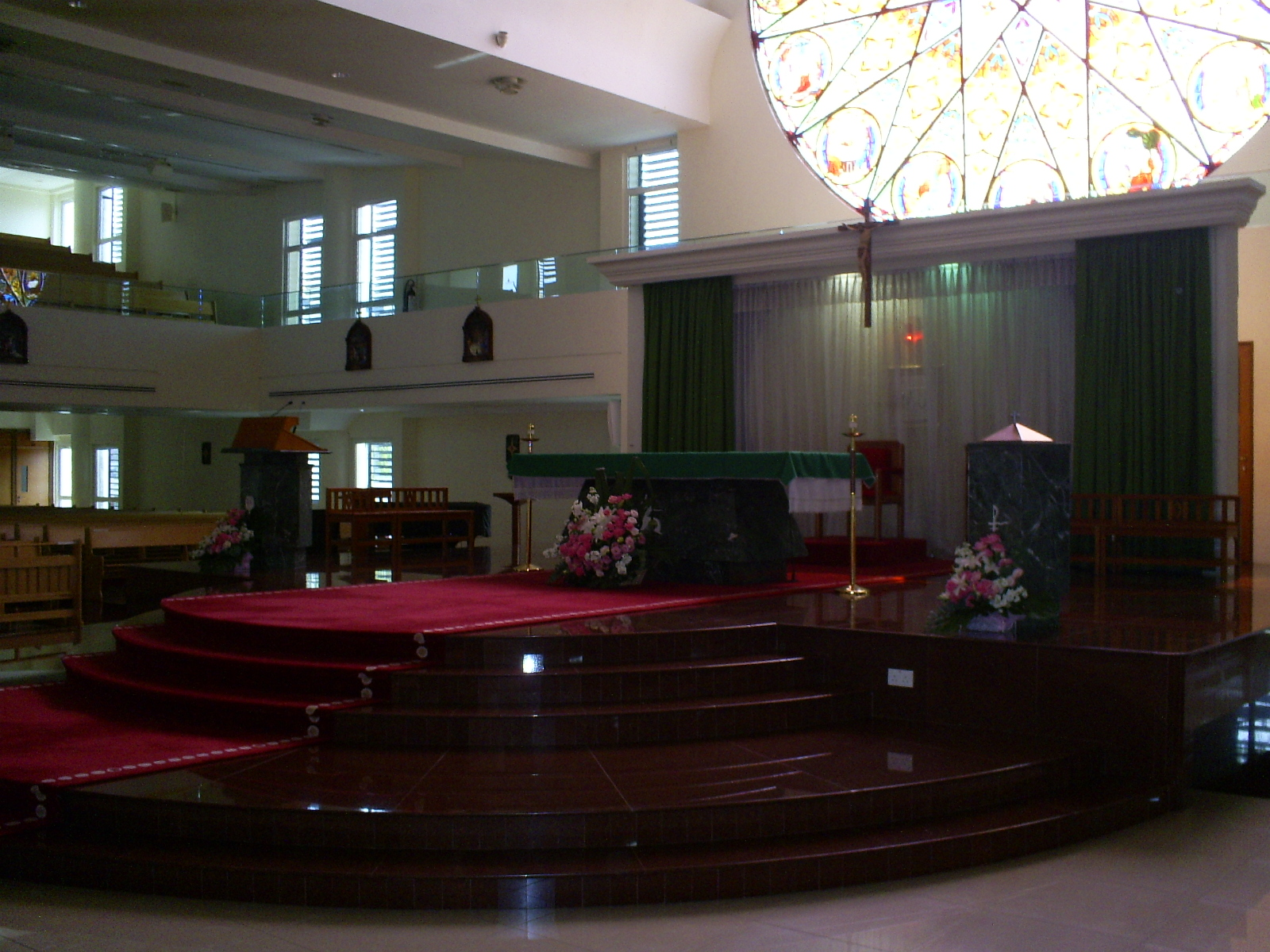
View of the altar from the northeast.

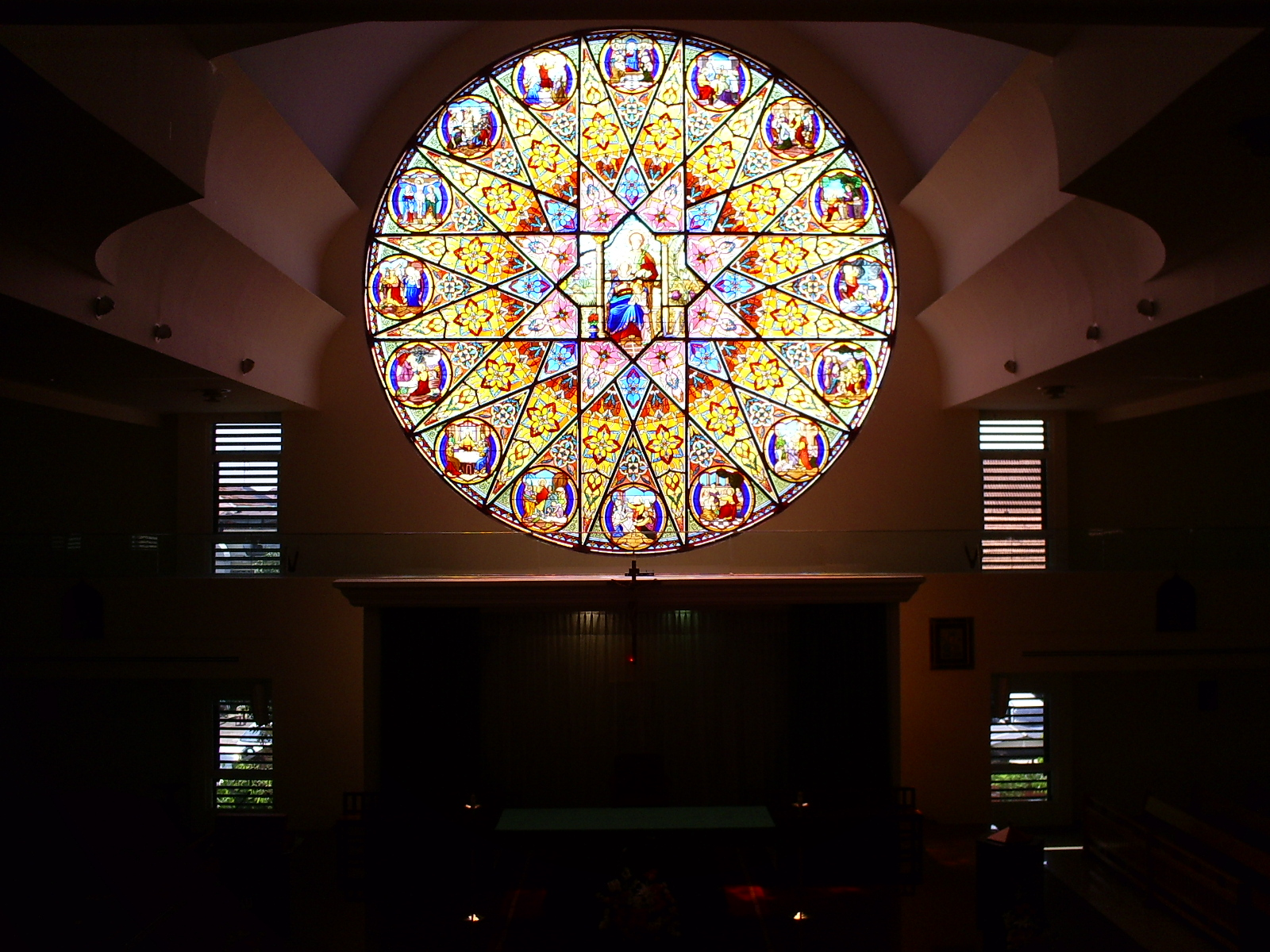
View of the 16-paneled stained glass window, created by Joël Mône and realized by Vitrail Saint-Georges, from the third level of church building.

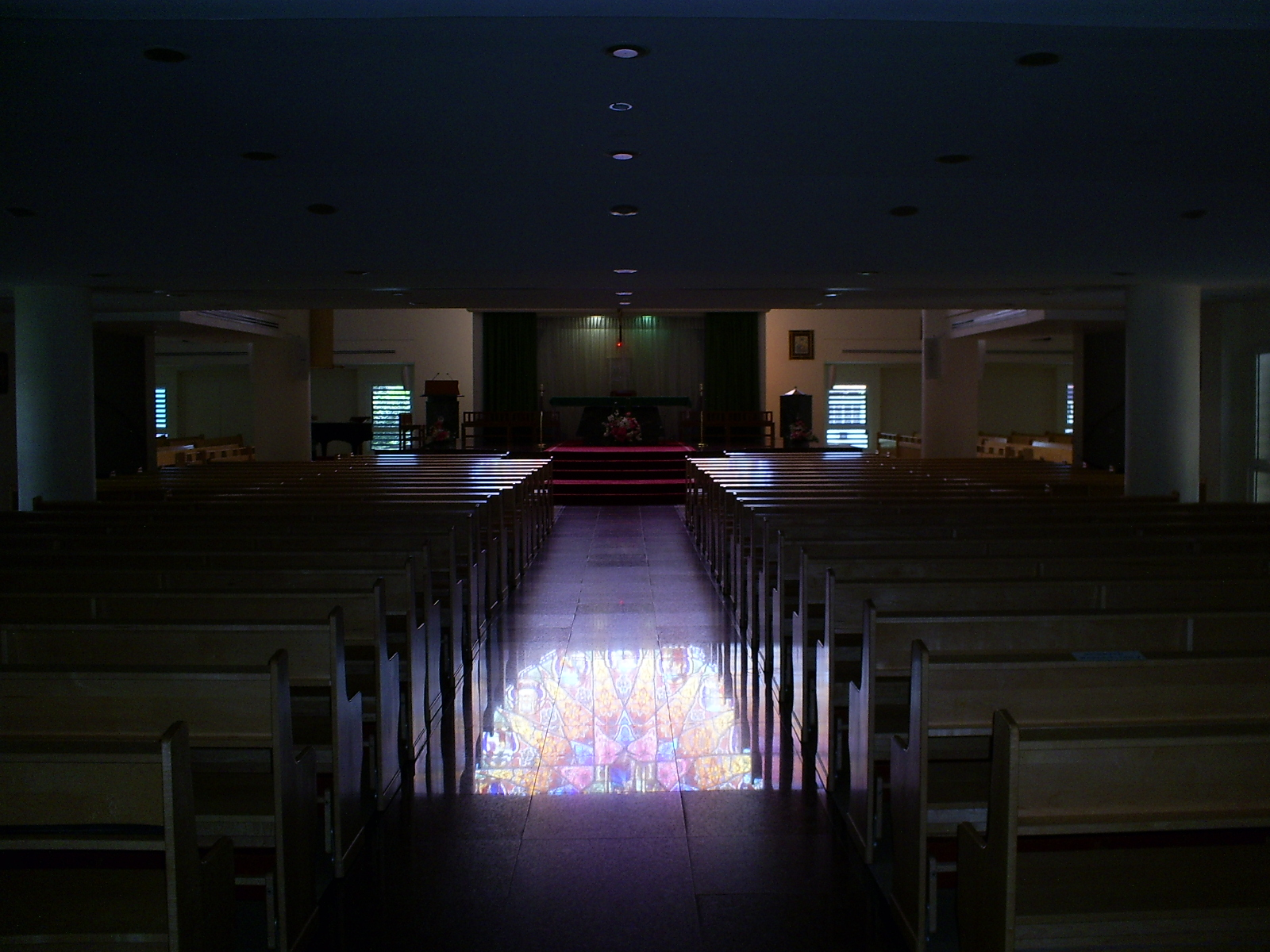
The altar seen from the main door.

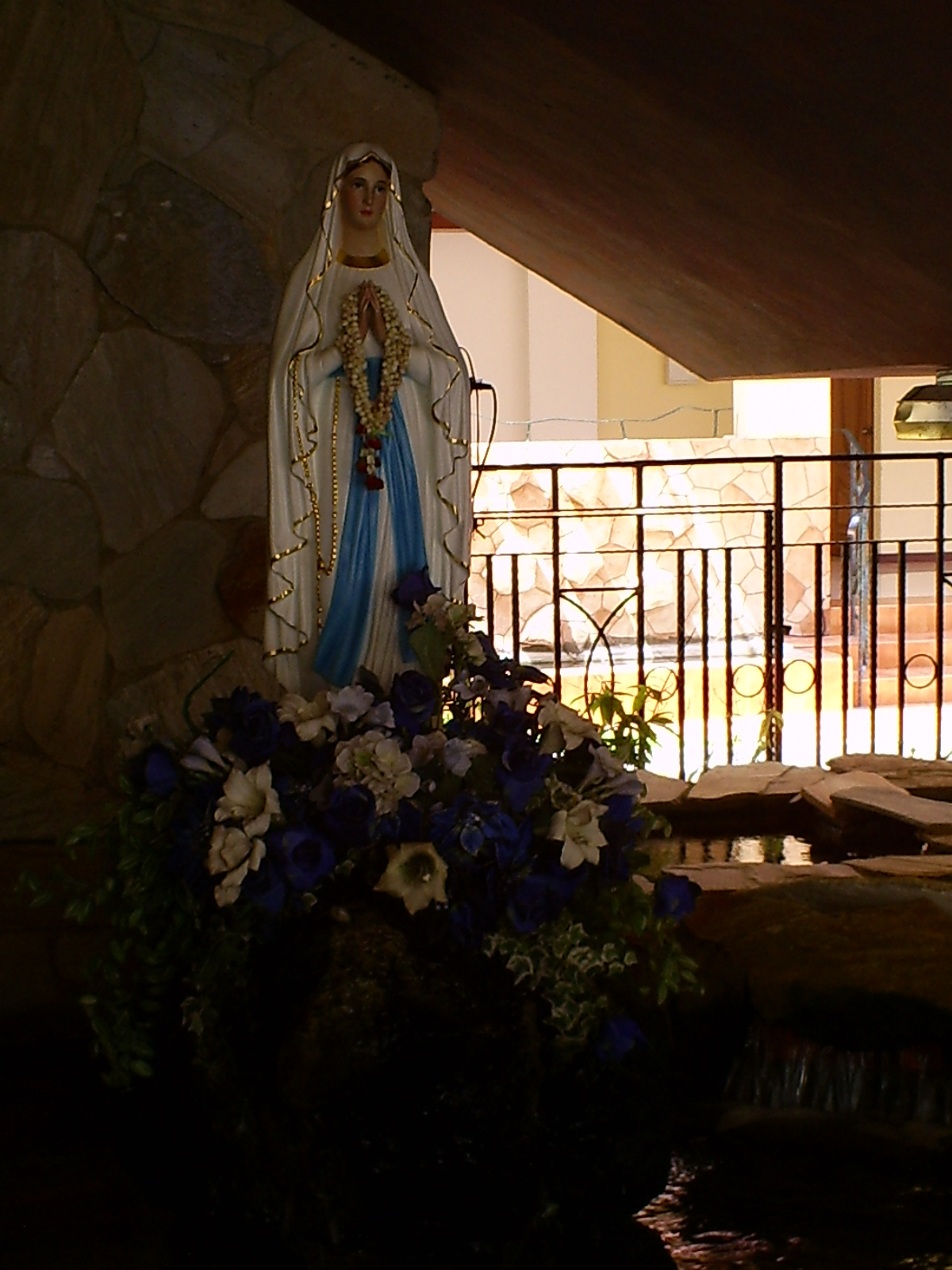
The statue of the Virgin Mary, sited in the grotto.
