= Michel Olçomendy =

French Catholic Archbishop

His Excellency Michel Olçomendy M.E.P.
- Archbishop of Singapore
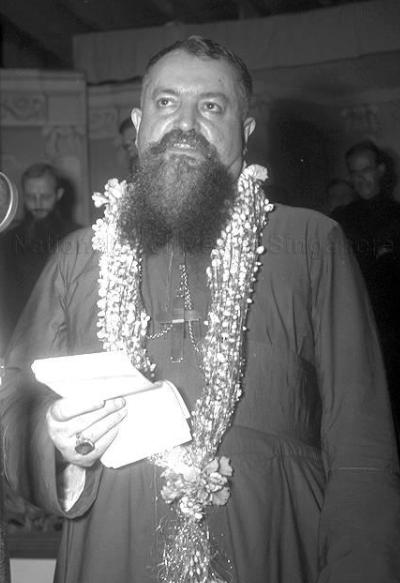
- Olçomendy in 1951
- See: Archdiocese of Singapore
- Installed: 18 December 1972
- Term ended: 1976
- Successor: Archbishop Gregory Yong

Orders
- Ordination: 29 May 1926
- Consecration: 1 June 1947 (As Bishop of Malacca)

Personal details
- Born: 29 August 1901 Saint-Étienne-de-Baïgorry, France
- Died: 4 July 1977 (aged 75) Singapore
- Denomination: Roman Catholic

Michel Olçomendy, M.E.P. (29 August 1901 – 4 July 1977) was the first Archbishop of Singapore, installed on 18 December 1972 until his retirement in 1976. Previously, he served as the Bishop of Malacca and Singapore.

== Biography ==
=== Early years ===
Born in Saint-Étienne-de-Baïgorry, France, he was ordained a priest on 29 May 1926 at the age of 24, and became a clergyman of the La Société des Missions Etrangères.

=== Bishop of Malacca ===
On 21 January 1947, Olçomendy was officially installed as Bishop of Malacca and Singapore at the Cathedral of the Good Shepherd, serving in the position until he was appointed Archbishop of Malacca on 19 September 1953, at the age of 52.

=== Archbishop of Malacca-Singapore ===
He took office as Metropolitan Archbishop of Malacca-Singapore on 25 February 1955, and as President of Catholic Bishops’ Conference of Malaysia, Singapore and Brunei in 1964. Olçomendy remained as president until 1969.

Olçomendy took on the new office as the Archbishop of Singapore on 18 December 1972, until retiring in 1976. Olçomendy died a year later on 4 July 1977.

Catholic Church titles
| Preceded by New position | Archbishop of Singapore; 1947–1976 | Succeeded by Gregory Yong |
