= Barthélemy Bruguière =

French bishop

Most Reverend Barthélemy Bruguière
- Apostolic Vicar of Korea
- Church: Catholic Church
- Diocese: Apostolic Vicar of Korea
- Predecessor: None
- Successor: Laurent-Joseph-Marius Imbert
- Previous post: Coadjutor Vicar Apostolic of Siam

Orders
- Ordination: December 23, 1815
- Consecration: June 29, 1829 by Esprit-Marie-Joseph Florens

Personal details
- Born: February 12, 1792 Raissac-d'Aude, France
- Died: October 20, 1835 (aged 43)

Barthélemy Bruguière (February 12, 1792 – October 20, 1835) was the first Apostolic Vicar of Korea and former Coadjutor Vicar Apostolic of Siam.

== Biography ==
Bruguière was born in Raissac-d'Aude, France and studied at the seminary of Carcassonne. He was ordained a priest on December 23, 1815 and then taught at the seminary for a decade. Wanting to do missionary work, he joined the La Société des Missions Etrangères (MEP) with the intention of going to Vietnam. In 1827, after arriving in Asia, he was instead assigned to the Apostolic Vicariate of Siam where the existing bishop, Esprit-Marie-Joseph Florens had only one missionary priest. He learned the Thai language but soon found out the majority of Christians were typically not of Thai ancestry but rather Khmer, Chinese, Vietnamese, and those of mixed Portuguese-Asian background; as the Thai Buddhists were not as amenable to conversion, he focused his efforts on the minority groups.

Bruguière taught at the school at the Church of the Assumption for several years and then after repeated requests by Florens for a replacement, he was appointed by Pope Leo XII on February 5, 1828, the Coadjutor Vicar Apostolic of Siam and Titular Bishop of Capsus. He was consecrated bishop on June 29, 1829, by Bishop Esprit-Marie-Joseph Florens, Vicar Apostolic of Siam. In 1830, after two new missionary priests arrived in Bangkok (Claude-Antoine Deschavannes and Jean-Baptiste Pallegoix), Bruguière moved to Penang in 1831 where he taught at the MEP-run General College along with Jacques-Honoré Chastan, Jean-Baptiste Boucho, Jean Pierre Barbe, and Laurent-Joseph-Marius Imbert. An influx of funding and MEP missionaries into the region lessened the need for him to remain in Siam and it was proposed that he go to Korea and establish a new mission. Bishop Florens supported the mission despite the fact that it would leave him without a coadjutor when he died.

On September 9, 1831, Bruguière was appointed the first Apostolic Vicar of Korea by Pope Gregory XVI. In 1835, he sailed from Singapore to Manila and then to China first to Macau then to Fujian Province and finally to Shanxi Province. Due to persecutions against Christians in China and political changes in Korea, he first took shelter amongst the Christian population in Xiwanzi where he met MEP missionary Pierre-Philibert Maubant who volunteered for the Korea mission. On October 7, 1835, they set out but before he could reach Korea, Bruguière became sick and died on October 20, 1835. Maubant would later be joined by Jacques-Honoré Chastan and Laurent Joseph Marius Imbert where they would eventually be arrested and martyred.

In 1931, Bruguière's remains were moved and reburied in a cemetery in Seoul.
