= Saenamteo =

Church building in Seoul, South Korea

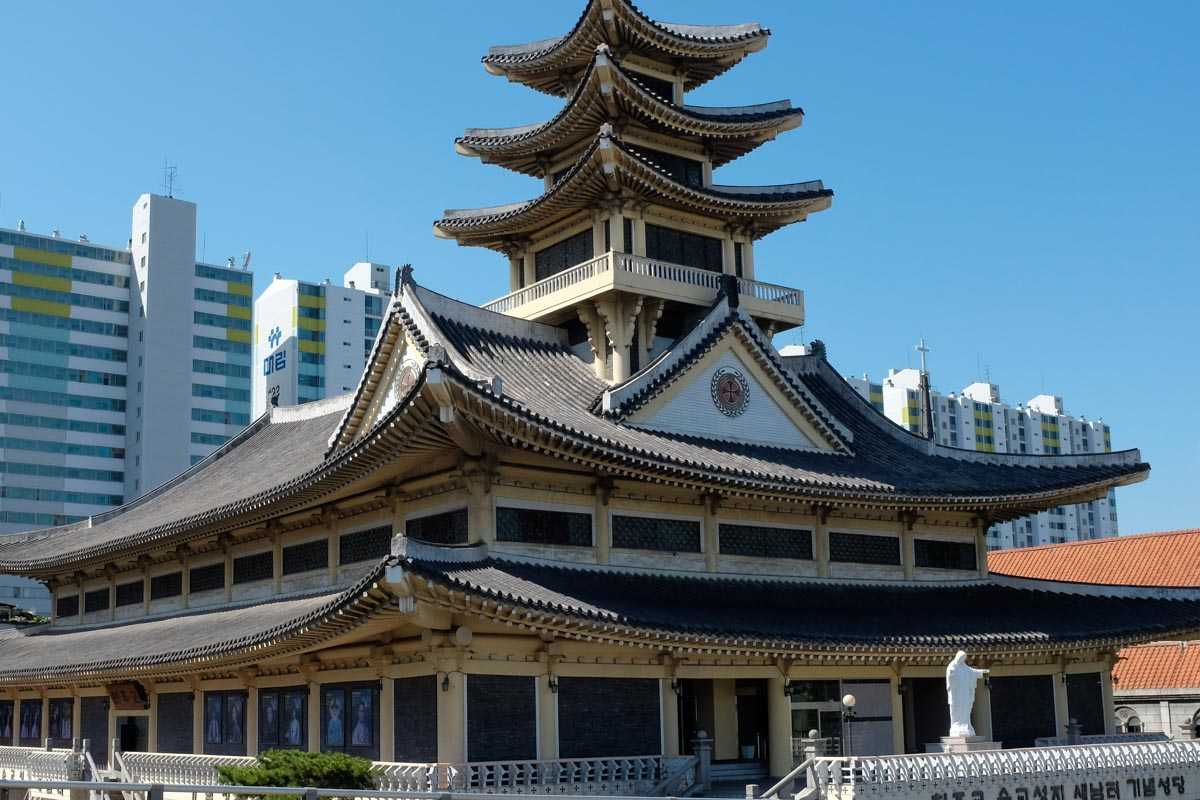
- The Saenamteo martyrs' shrine and Catholic Church

Location
- Location: Seoul, South Korea
- Interactive map of Saenamteo
- Coordinates: 37°31′30″N 126°57′25″E

Architecture
- Completed: 1987

Korean name
- Hangul: 새남터
- RR: Saenamteo
- MR: Saenamt'ŏ

Saenamteo (Korean: 새남터) is a location on the north bank of the Han River in Seoul, South Korea. During the Joseon period it was a sandy area outside the city walls. that was used punishment of political prisoners, including Roman Catholic believers, priests, and missionaries among the Korean Martyrs. A memorial church, consecrated in 1987, now stands on the site and houses a Martyrs' Memorial.

== Etymology ==
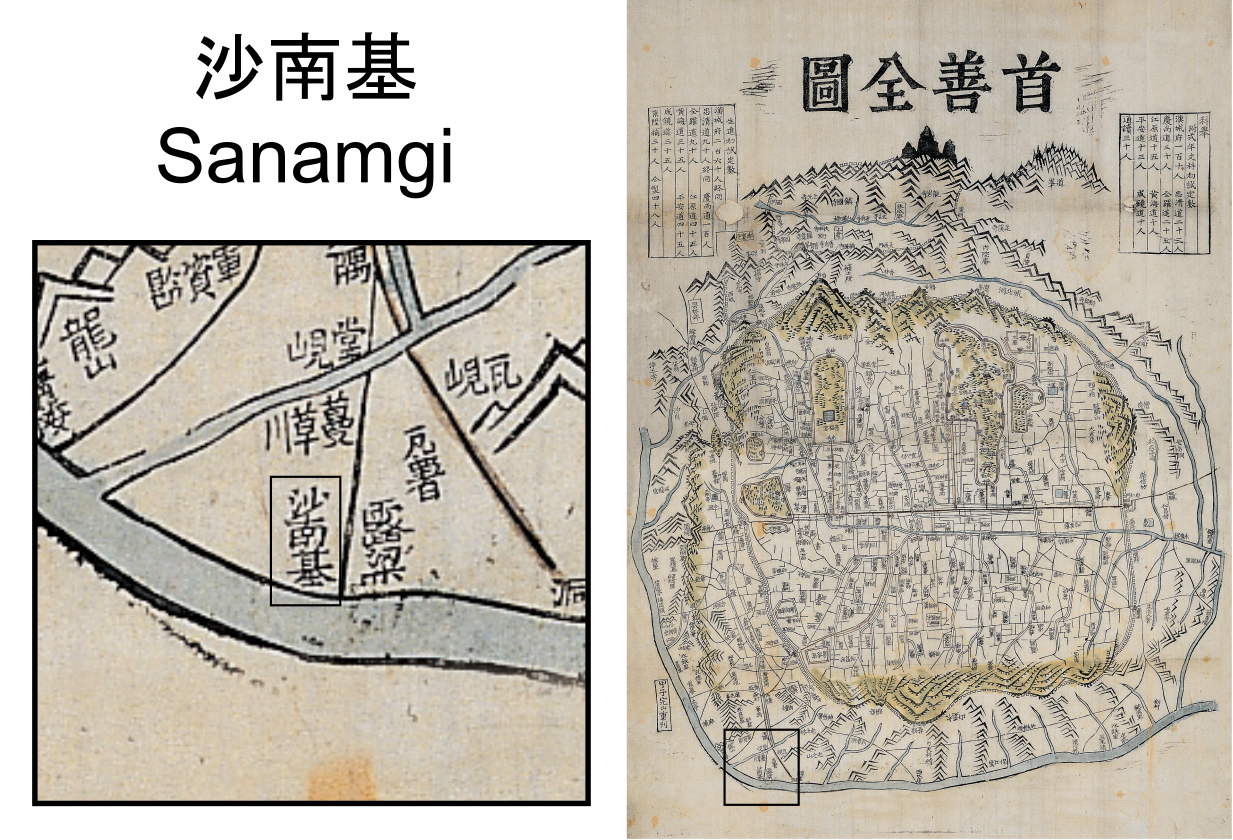
Saenamteo as Sanamgi in the Suseonjeondo map of Seoul circa 1840

The name Saenamteo is said to derive from the original Saenamuteo (새나무터), so called because of the trees and sawgrass found there. According to another version it comes from Sanamgi (사남기; 沙南基), the Sino-Korean rendering of the former native Korean name Nodeul.

== Geography ==
The site was a strip of sandy and wet land between the Han River to the south and the Fortress Wall of Hanyang (now Seoul) to the north. It is now within Yongsan District near the north bank of the Han River.

== History ==
Saenamteo was used from the early Joseon Dynasty for military training and as a place of punishment for those convicted of political crimes. In 1456, a number of royal officials were executed there for plotting to overthrow Sejo of Joseon and restore his deposed nephew, Danjong, to the throne. The most famous of these were executed at Saenamteo and became known as the Six Martyred Ministers. The six later came to be honored as models of loyalty.

The Saenamteo site is most famous as the place of execution of Roman Catholic martyrs during four anti-Catholic persecutions in the 19th century, occurring in 1801, 1839, 1846, and 1866. The victims included Korean, French, and Chinese priests, missionaries, and laypeople. Eleven priests were executed at Saenamteo, while the laypeople were more often executed at the crossroads outside Seosomun and other sites.

=== 1801 persecution and Zhou Wen-mo ===
The Chinese Catholic priest Jacob Zhou Wen-mo was sent from Beijing in 1794 to serve the Korean Catholic community of about 4,000 who had no pastor nor ordained man to administer the sacraments. Zhou secretly entered Korea through Uiju in December 1794 and reached Seoul in 1795. Zhou established the Myeongdohoe, a lay committee charged with teaching and caring for the faithful. During the Catholic Persecution of 1801, several Korean Catholics were tortured and executed to force them to reveal the whereabouts of Father Zhou. He had left Seoul to escape to China, but returned and voluntarily turned himself in to the Uigeumbu. Zhou was beheaded at Saenamteo on May 31.

=== 1839 persecution ===
During the 1839 persecution, three French priests of the Paris Foreign Missions Society were beheaded at Saenamteo on September 21, 1839. They were Bishop Laurent-Marie-Joseph Imbert, Pierre-Philibert Maubant and Jacques-Honoré Chastan.

=== 1846 persecution and Kim Taegon ===
During the 1846 persecution, Father Andrew Kim Taegon, the first Korean Catholic priest, and Hyeon Seok-mun, who wrote the "Gihae Diary" as a record of Catholic church history in the Joseon dynasty, were executed at Saenamteo. Father Kim was executed on September 16, and Hyeon Seok-mun on September 19.

=== 1866 persecution ===
In 1866, six French Catholic priests and two Korean Catholic laymen were martyred at Seanamteo. The priests were Bishop Siméon-François Berneux, Simon-Marie-Just Ranfer de Bretenières, Bernard-Louis Beaulieu, Pierre-Henri Dorie, Charles-Antoine Pourthié, and Marie-Alexandre Petitnicolas, and the laymen were Woo Se-young and Jeong Ui-bae.

== Catholic church and holy place ==
Saenamteo was named a "martyrs' shrine" by the Korean Catholic church in 1950. A monument to Catholic martyrs was placed in 1956, and maintained by the Clerical Congregation of The Blessed Korean Martyrs since 1957. In 1981 the Saenamteo Parish was split off from the Han River Parish, and a Catholic church was established by the Archdiocese of Seoul. The Congregation of the Blessed Korean Martyrs began to construct a new church building in 1984, in a traditional Korean architectural style, for the commemoration of 200 years of Roman Catholicism in Korea. It was completed and consecrated three years later, in 1987. On September 3, 2006, a Seoul Archdiocese Saenamteo Martyrs' Shrine was opened within the church. It includes historical displays and the relics of nine of the Korean Martyrs.

In 1984, 103 of the Korean Martyrs were canonized in a ceremony in the Saenamteo church by Pope John Paul II. These were limited to the victims from the 1839, 1846, and 1866 persecutions for whom documentation could be found to meet the standard for canonization. Since that time, the process of canonization has begun or continued for additional martyrs.
