= Jean-Paul Courvezy =

French Catholic bishop (1792-1857)

Right Reverend Jean-Paul Courvezy M.E.P.
- Vicar Apostolic of Malacca-Singapore
- Installed: 10 September 1841
- Term ended: 7 September 1844
- Predecessor: Office created
- Successor: Jean-Baptiste Boucho
- Previous post: Vicar Apostolic of Siam (1834–1841)

Orders
- Ordination: 30 November 1833 as Titular Bishop of Bida

Personal details
- Born: 14 January 1792 Narbonne
- Died: 1 May 1857 (aged 65) Narbonne
- Denomination: Roman Catholic

Jean-Paul Hilaire Courvezy M.E.P. (14 January 1792 – 1 May 1857) was a French Roman Catholic missionary and bishop who served as Vicar Apostolic of Siam (1834–1841), and Vicar Apostolic of Malacca-Singapore (1841–1844).

== Biography ==
Courvezy was born on 14 January 1792 in Narbonne. After his priestly ordination, he served in the diocese of Carcassone, and in 1825 was appointed canon of Chartres and professor of theology at its seminary. In 1832, he joined the seminary of the Paris Foreign Missions Society and in the same year was sent to the Siam mission.

In 1832, he went to Singapore and played a leading role in the building of the first Catholic chapel in the settlement, the forerunner of the Cathedral of the Good Shepherd. In 1833, he returned to Bangkok where he was ordained Titular Bishop of Bida, and appointed coadjutor of Bishop Esprit Marie Joseph Florens, and nominated his successor in the event his death. When Florens died on 30 March 1834, he assumed the office of Vicar Apostolic of Siam. Later that year, he returned to Singapore where he became involved in jurisdictional differences with the Portuguese Catholics who opposed the mission.

In 1841, the Apostolic Vicariate of Siam was divided into the Apostolic Vicariate of Eastern Siam with jurisdiction over Siam, and the Apostolic Vicariate of Western Siam with jurisdiction over the Malay Peninsula. On 10 September 1841, Courvezy was appointed Vicar Apostolic of the Vicariate of Malacca-Singapore. On 18 June 1843, he blessed the foundation stone of the Church of the Good Shepherd, Singapore.

In 1844, he returned to France and his resignation was accepted by Rome on 7 September 1844. He settled in Narbonne where he died on 1 May 1857.
