= Laurent-Joseph-Marius Imbert =

French Roman Catholic saint (1796–1839)

Saint Laurent-Joseph-Marius Imbert Bishop Bum Sehyeong M.E.P.
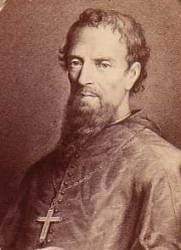
- Second Roman Catholic Bishop of Korea

French missionary, bishop and martyr
- Born: 23 March 1796; Marignane, Bouches-du-Rhône, France
- Died: 21 September 1839 (aged 43); Saenamteo, Kingdom of Joseon
- Venerated in: Roman Catholic Church (Korea and the Paris Foreign Missions Society)
- Beatified: 5 July 1925, Vatican City, by Pope Pius XI
- Canonized: 6 May 1984, Seoul, South Korea, by Pope John Paul II
- Major shrine: Saenamteo Memorial Church, Seoul, South Korea
- Feast: 21 September; 20 September (along with Korean Martyrs)

- Korean name
- Hangul: 범세형
- Hanja: 范世亨
- RR: Beom Sehyeong
- MR: Pŏm Sehyŏng

Laurent-Joseph-Marius Imbert (Born: 23 March 1796 – Died: 21 September 1839), affectionately known in Korea as Bishop Laurentius Bum Sehyeong (Korean: 범세형 라우렌시오) was a Roman Catholic French bishop in Asia. He was most notable for his Christian missionary work among the Koreans, he was appointed by Pope Gregory XVI in August 1836 when first Bishop Barthélemy Bruguière died in Manchuria.

Eventually, he was executed in the Kingdom of Joseon for his Catholic faith; it is estimated that 8,000 to 10,000 were killed for their faith in 19th-century Korea - the Korean Martyrs. 103 of them, including Imbert, were canonized by the Catholic Church as saints in 1984. His feast day is 21 September, and he is also venerated with the rest of the 103 Korean martyrs on 20 September.

== Biography ==
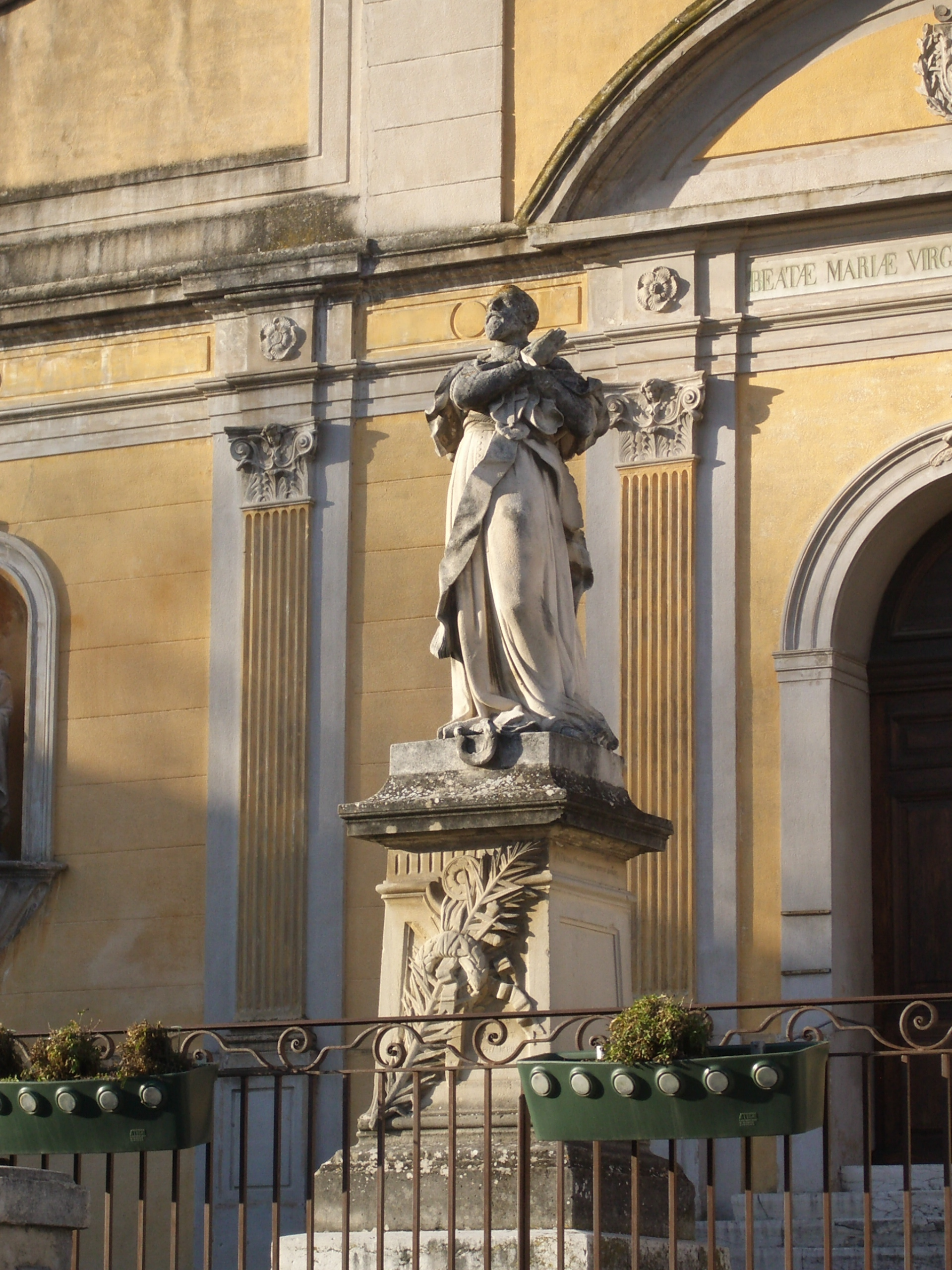
A statue of Laurent in the Church of Callas, France. By Hippolyte de Ferrat.

Imbert was born at Marignane, to parents who were residents of the hamlet of Callas, in the commune of Cabriès in the Department of Bouches-du-Rhône. When he became of age, he was sent to Aix to pursue his studies. According to reports, he paid his expenses by making and selling rosaries. He then enrolled at the seminary of the Paris Foreign Missions Society on 8 October 1818.

On 5 March 1819, Imbert was incardinated in the Archdiocese of Paris, and ordained on 18 December of that same year, having received an indult from the Holy See due to his not having reached the legal age. He then set sail from France on 20 March 1820, bound for missionary service in China.

Imbert's first stop was in Penang, Malaya, where he was asked to replace a teacher at the College General (Major Seminary), who had taken ill. He taught there from April 1821 to January 1822

In 1821, Esprit-Marie-Joseph Florens, the Vicar Apostolic of Siam, requested for him to call at Singapore. The bishop had been contemplating opening a missionary station in Singapore. He was not very certain, though, whether there was any urgency or he was aware of the circumstances prevailing in the island. Therefore, the young missionary was to check on the situation. He reached Singapore on 11 December 1821 and spent about a week there. Imbert was the first priest to celebrate Mass on the island.

In February 1822, Imbert sailed for Macau, but unable to go directly there, he spent the next two years in Tonkin, French Indochina. Only then was he able to enter China, where he spent twelve years in Sichuan and founded a seminary in Moupin.

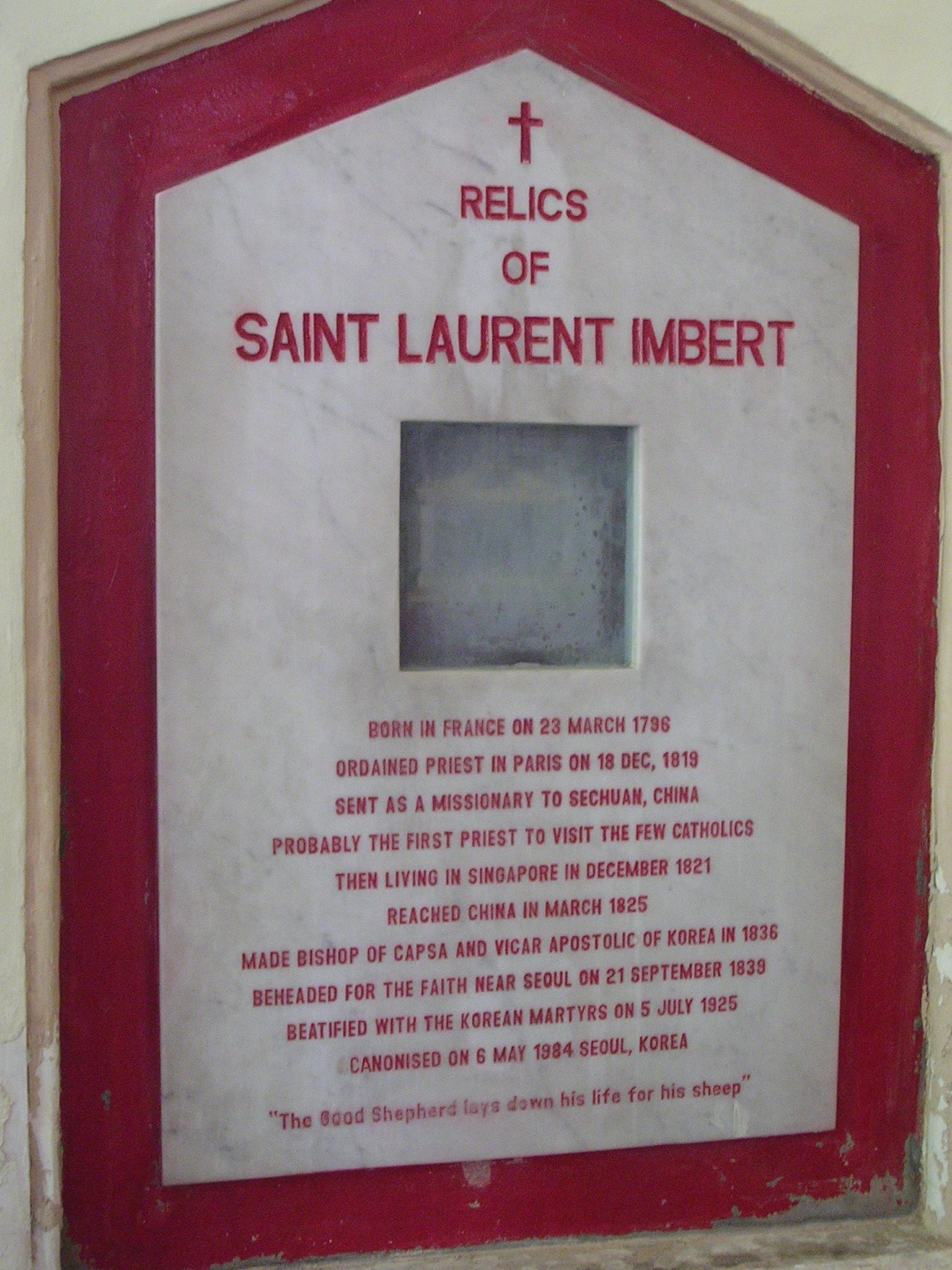
The relics of Saint Laurent Imbert at the Cathedral of the Good Shepherd, Singapore.

On 26 April 1836, Imbert was appointed Vicar Apostolic of Korea and Titular Bishop of Capsa. He was consecrated on 14 May 1837 by Giacomo Luigi Fontana M.E.P., the Vicar Apostolic of Szechwan. He then crossed secretly from Manchuria to Korea that same year. During this time, Korea was going through a period of Christian persecution.

On 10 August 1839, Imbert, who was secretly going about his missionary work, was betrayed. Realizing that it was only a matter of time before he was arrested and killed, he celebrated Mass and surrendered himself to those who lay in waiting for him. He was taken to Seoul, where he was tortured to reveal the whereabouts of foreign missionaries. Mistakenly believing that his converts would be spared if all foreign missionaries came out from hiding and gave themselves up, he wrote a note to his fellow missionaries, Pierre-Philibert Maubant and Jacques-Honoré Chastan, asking them to surrender to the Korean authorities as well, which they did.

All three of them were imprisoned together. They were taken before an interrogator and questioned for three days to reveal the names and whereabouts of their converts. As torture failed to break them down, they were sent to another prison and beheaded on 21 September 1839 at Saenamteo, Korea. Their bodies remained exposed for several days but were finally buried on Nogu Mountain.

The three were among the 79 Korean Martyrs beatified in 1925, and among the 103 Korean Martyrs canonized by Pope John Paul II in Seoul on 6 May 1984.

The feast day of Saint Laurent Imbert is celebrated on 20 September (formerly 10 June). Accordingly, a religious statue of Imbert Bum is also enshrined at a side chapel of the Myeongdong Cathedral, where pious women have vested the image in the traditional Hanbok costume of South Korea.

== See also ==
- The Good Shepherd (Christianity)
- Saint
- Korean Martyrs
- Catholic Church in Korea
- Catholic Church in Sichuan
- Catholic Church in Singapore
- Cathedral of the Good Shepherd

== Bibliography ==
- Eugene Wijeysingha (2006), Going Forth... – The Catholic Church in Singapore 1819–2004, Titular Roman Catholic Archbishop of Singapore, ISBN 981-05-5703-5
- The Lives of the 103 Martyr Saints of Korea: Saint Laurent Marie Joseph Imbert, Bishop (1797–1839), Catholic Bishops' Conference of Korea Newsletter No. 49 (Winter 2004).
