= Esprit-Marie-Joseph Florens =

Most Reverend Esprit-Marie-Joseph Florens
- Apostolic Vicar of Siam
- Church: Catholic Church
- Diocese: Apostolic Vicariate of Siam
- Predecessor: Arnaud-Antoine Garnault
- Successor: Jean-Paul-Hilaire-Michel Courvezy

Orders
- Ordination: 1786
- Consecration: April 12, 1812 by Jean Labartette

Personal details
- Born: February 12, 1762 Lagnes, France
- Died: March 30, 1834 (aged 71)

Esprit-Marie-Joseph Florens (June 4, 1762 – March 30, 1834) was the Vicar Apostolic of Siam.

== Biography ==
Esprit-Marie-Joseph Florens was born in Lagnes, France on 4 Jun 1762. In 1786, he was ordained a priest in La Société des Missions Etrangères dedicated to missionary work.

He travelled to Thailand in 1787 and was placed in charge of Chantaboun district; in 1791, he was also given charge of the Sainte-Croix parish in Bangkok.

On June 29, 1810, Pope Pius VII was named as Titular Bishop of Sozopolis in Haemimonto and appointed Florens as Coadjutor Vicar Apostolic of Siam. On March 4, 1811, he succeeded Arnaud-Antoine Garnault. He was consecrated bishop on April 12, 1812, by Bishop Jean Labartette, Vicar Apostolic of Cochin.

He appointed Laurent-Joseph-Marius Imbert to travel to Singapore; Imbert held the first Mass in Singapore in 1821.

Pope Leo XII issued a decree in September 1827 which gave Florens jurisdiction over Singapore.

Florens is buried in Bangkok.

== Episcopal succession ==
While bishop, he was the principal consecrator of:

- Barthélemy Bruguière, Titular Bishop of Capsus (1829); and
- Jean-Louis Taberd, Titular Bishop of Isauropolis (1830).

== Family ==
Esprit’s brother Jean-Louis Florens (1756 – 1814) was also a missionary to Asia; he served in Vietnam and is buried in So-trai.

Catholic Church titles
Preceded by	Titular Bishop of Sozopolis in Haemimonto; 1811–1834	Succeeded by
Preceded by Arnaud-Antoine Garnault	Vicar Apostolic of Siam; 1811–1834	Succeeded by Jean-Paul Courvezy
