= Denis McSwiney =

Singaporean architect

Denis Lesley McSwiney came to Singapore in 1828 and was responsible for the construction of the Cathedral of the Good Shepherd. Having been a merchant and contractor, he was at one time a clerk to George Drumgoole Coleman. Leaving Singapore in 1847, he had only one other building to his credit, the first Assembly Rooms, built on the site of the old Hill Street Police Station, which became unserviceable in 1858, ten years after its erection.
