= Jean-Baptiste Boucho =

French vicar (1797–1871)

Most Reverend Jean-Baptiste Boucho
- Apostolic Vicar of Malacca-Singapore
- Church: Catholic Church
- Diocese: Vicar Apostolic of Malacca-Singapore
- Predecessor: Jean-Paul-Hilaire-Michel Courvezy
- Successor: Michel-Esther Le Turdu

Orders
- Consecration: October 19, 1845 by Patrick Joseph Carew

Personal details
- Born: February 18, 1797 Athos-Aspis, France
- Died: March 6, 1871 (aged 74)

Jean-Baptiste Boucho (February 18, 1797-March 6, 1871) was the Vicar Apostolic of Malacca-Singapore.

== Biography ==
Jean-Baptiste Boucho was born in Athos-Aspis, France and in 1824, moved to Malaya where he was ordained as a priest of the La Société des Missions Etrangères dedicated to missionary work. In Penang, he was appointed the Parish Priest of the Church of the Assumption and established the Catholic Free School for boys.

On June 10, 1845, Pope Gregory XVI appointed him Vicar Apostolic of Malacca-Singapore and Titular Bishop of Attalea in Pamphylia. On October 19, 1845, he was consecrated bishop by Archbishop Patrick Joseph Carew, Vicar Apostolic of Bengal. Bishop Marc-Thomas Oliffe, Coadjutor Vicar Apostolic of Bengal, served as Co-Consecrator.

== See also ==
- Catholic Church in Malaysia
