= List of schools in Bangkok =

This is a list of schools in Bangkok, Thailand.

== Public Schools ==
- Bangpakok Wittayakom School
- Benjamarachalai School
- Bodindecha (Sing Singhaseni) School
- Chinorotwittayalai School
- Chitralada School
- Debsirin School
- Horwang School
- Kasetsart University Laboratory School
- Mahapruttaram Girls' School
- Nawaminthrachinuthit Bodindecha School
- Patumwan Demonstration School, Srinakharinwirot University
- Potisarnpittayakorn School
- Prakanongpittayalai School
- Protpittayapayat School
- Rajavinit Mathayom School
- Rittiyawannalai School
- Samsenwittayalai School
- Sarawittaya School
- Satri Si Suriyothai School
- Satriwitthaya 2 School
- Secondary Demonstration School of Bansomdejchaopraya Rajabhat University
- Suankularb Wittayalai School
- Suankularb Wittayalai Thonburi School
- Suksanari School
- Surasakmontree School
- Taweethapisek School
- Triam Udom Suksa Pattanakarn School
- Triam Udom Suksa School
- Triamudomsuksapattanakarn Ratchada School
- Wat Putthabucha School
- Wat Rajabopit School
- Wat Suthiwararam School
- Yothinburana School

== Private Schools ==
- Amnuay Silpa School
- Darunsikkhalai School for Innovative Learning
- Enconcept E-Academy
- Rajini School
- Rajinibon School
- Sarasas Witaed Suksa School
- Vajiravudh College

=== International Schools ===
- American School of Bangkok
- Anglo Singapore International School
- Bangkok Patana School
- Bangkok Prep
- Bromsgrove International School Thailand
- Concordian International School
- Ekamai International School
- Garden International School Bangkok
- Harrow International School Bangkok
- Heathfield International School
- International Community School (Thailand)
- International School Bangkok
- KIS International School
- Korean International School of Bangkok
- Lycée Français International de Bangkok
- New Sathorn International School
- NIST International School
- Niva International School
- Pan-Asia International School
- Ramkhamhaeng Advent International School
- Regent's International School
- RIS Swiss Section
- Ruamrudee International School
- St Andrews International School Bangkok
- St. Mark's International School Bangkok
- Shrewsbury International School
- Singapore International School of Bangkok
- Thai-Chinese International School
- Thai-Japanese Association School
- Traill International School
- TSI International School
- Wells International School
- Wycombe Abbey International School Bangkok

=== Christian Schools ===
- Bangkok Christian College
- Wattana Wittaya Academy

==== Catholic Schools ====
- Assumption College (Thailand)
- Assumption College Thonburi
- Assumption Convent School (Thailand)
- Assumption Suksa School
- Mater Dei School (Thailand)
- Sacred Heart Convent School (Bangkok)
- Saint Gabriel's College
- Saint John's Group of Schools
- Sarasas Ektra School

== See also ==
- List of schools in Thailand
- List of universities in Bangkok
