= List of demonstration schools in Thailand =

In Thailand, many universities operate demonstration schools, also known as laboratory schools (Thai: โรงเรียนสาธิต, sathit or satit schools) as part of their teacher-training programmes. These schools provide student teachers with practice-teaching opportunities, and are also used by the universities for education research and development. The oldest dedicated teacher-training schools in Thailand are the Prasarnmit and Patumwan Demonstration Schools of Srinakharinwirot University, which opened in 1953 and 1954, respectively. Many more schools have since been created or re-purposed, and there are now sixty-four demonstration schools in the country.

The large majority of Thai demonstration schools are operated by public universities, the lone exception being the Satit Bilingual School of Rangsit University, which is private. As they are effectively departments of the universities, demonstration schools don't come under the direct authority of the Ministry of Education, and have a greater degree of freedom in their operations than most state schools. They are generally viewed as providing higher-quality education, and entry into many demonstration schools is extremely competitive. This list is arranged with schools operated by public universities appearing first, followed by those of Rajabhat and Rajamangala Universities, then private institutions.

== List of schools ==
School name	University	Province	Levels taught	Opened
Chulalongkorn University Demonstration Elementary School	CU	Bangkok	Pre-elementary–Elementary	1958
Chulalongkorn University Demonstration Secondary School	CU	Bangkok	Secondary	1958
Kasetsart University Laboratory School	KU	Bangkok	Elementary–Secondary	1971
Ramkhamhaeng University Demonstration School (Elementary)	RU	Bangkok	Pre-elementary–Elementary	1994
Ramkhamhaeng University Demonstration School (Bangna Campus)	RU	Bangkok	Pre-elementary–Elementary	2019
The Demonstration School of Ramkhamhaeng University (Secondary)	RU	Bangkok	Secondary	1973
Srinakharinwirot University Prasarnmit Demonstration School (Elementary)	SWU	Bangkok	Pre-elementary–Elementary	1956
Srinakharinwirot University Prasarnmit Demonstration School (Secondary)	SWU	Bangkok	Secondary	1953
Patumwan Demonstration School, Srinakharinwirot University	SWU	Bangkok	Secondary	1954
Chiang Mai University Demonstration School	CMU	Chiang Mai	Secondary	1968
"Piboonbumpen" Demonstration School, Burapha University	BUU	Chonburi	Pre-elementary–Secondary	1939
Demonstration School of Khon Kaen University (Suksasart)	KKU	Khon Kaen	Pre-elementary–Secondary	1970
Demonstration School of Khon Kaen University (Modindaeng)	KKU	Khon Kaen	Elementary–Secondary	1970
Mahasarakham University Demonstration School (Elementary)	MSU	Maha Sarakham	Pre-elementary–Elementary	2004
Mahasarakham University Demonstration School (Secondary)	MSU	Maha Sarakham	Secondary	1997
Ongkharak Demonstration School	SWU	Nakhon Nayok	Pre-elementary–Secondary	2014
Kasetsart University Laboratory School Kamphaeng Saen Campus	KU	Nakhon Pathom	Pre-elementary–Secondary	1980
The Demonstration School of Silpakorn University (Early Childhood & Elementary)	SU	Nakhon Pathom	Pre-elementary–Elementary	2005
The Demonstration School of Silpakorn University	SU	Nakhon Pathom	Secondary	1974
Demonstration School of Thammasat University	TU	Pathum Thani	Pre-elementary–Secondary	2016
Anuban Satit School, Prince of Songkla University	PSU	Pattani	Pre-elementary–Elementary	1988
Demonstration School, Prince of Songkla University	PSU	Pattani	Secondary	1969
Demonstration School, University of Phayao	UP	Phayao	Secondary	2012
Naresuan University Secondary Demonstration School	NU	Phitsanulok	Secondary	2006
Early Childhood Demonstrative Center, Bansomdejchaopraya Rajabhat University	BSRU	Bangkok	Pre-elementary	2004
Elementary Demonstration School of Bansomdejchaopraya Rajabhat University	BSRU	Bangkok	Elementary	1958
Secondary Demonstration School of Bansomdejchaopraya Rajabhat University	BSRU	Bangkok	Secondary	1958
The Demonstration School of Chandrakasem Rajabhat University	CRU	Bangkok	Pre-elementary–Elementary	1992
Wat Pra Srimahadhat Secondary Demonstration School, Phranakhon Rajabhat University	PNRU	Bangkok	Secondary	1953
La-orutis Demonstration School, Suan Dusit Rajabhat University	SDRU	Bangkok	Pre-elementary–Elementary	1939
Primary Demonstration School of Suan Sunandha Rajabhat University	SSRU	Bangkok	Elementary	1937
Secondary Demonstration School of Suan Sunandha Rajabhat University	SSRU	Bangkok	Secondary	1937
Demonstration School of Buriram Rajabhat University	BRU	Buriram	Pre-elementary–Elementary	1982
Demonstration School of Rajabhat Rajanagarindra University	RRU	Chachoengsao	Pre-elementary–Elementary	1979
Demonstration School of Chaiyaphum Rajabhat University	CPRU	Chaiyaphum	Pre-elementary	2009
Demonstration School of Rambhai Barni Rajabhat University	RBRU	Chanthaburi	Pre-elementary	1981
The Demonstration School of Chiang Mai Rajabhat University	CMRU	Chiang Mai	Pre-elementary–Elementary	1979
Demonstration School of Chiangrai Rajabhat University	CRRU	Chiang Rai	Pre-elementary–Elementary	1985
Kamphaeng Phet Rajabhat University Kindergarten	KPRU	Kamphaeng Phet	Pre-elementary	2007
The Demonstration School of Loei Rajabhat University	LRU	Loei	Pre-elementary–Elementary	2004
The Demonstration School of Thepsatri Rajabhat University	TRU	Lopburi	Secondary	1920
Rajabhat Maha Sarakham University Demonstration School	RMU	Maha Sarakham	Pre-elementary–Secondary	1973
Demonstration School of Nakhon Pathom Rajabhat University	NPRU	Nakhon Pathom	Secondary	1986
Demonstration School of Nakhon Ratchasima Rajabhat University	NRRU	Nakhon Ratchasima	Pre-elementary–Elementary	1987
Nakhon Sawan Rajabhat University Demonstration School	NSRU	Nakhon Sawan	Pre-elementary–Secondary	1974
The Laboratory School of Nakhon Si Thammarat Rajabhat University	NSTRU	Nakhon Si Thammarat	Pre-elementary–Elementary	1986
Valaya Alongkorn Rajabhat University Demonstration School	VRU	Pathum Thani	Pre-elementary–Secondary	1974
Demonstration School of Phetchabun Ratchabhat University	PCRU	Phetchabun	Pre-elementary	2000
Demonstration School of Phetchaburi Rajabhat University	PBRU	Phetchaburi	Secondary	2011
Pibulsongkram Rajabhat University Demonstration School	PSRU	Phitsanulok	Pre-elementary–Elementary	1962
Satitpathomvai School, Phranakhon Si Ayutthaya Rajabhat University	ARU	Phra Nakhon Si Ayutthaya	Pre-elementary	2000
Demonstration Elementary School, Phranakhon Si Ayutthaya Rajabhat University	ARU	Phra Nakhon Si Ayutthaya	Elementary	2005
Laboratory School of Phranakhon Si Ayutthaya Rajabhat University	ARU	Phra Nakhon Si Ayutthaya	Secondary	1985
Demonstration School For Pre-School Education, Phuket Rajabhat University	PKRU	Phuket	Pre-elementary	1998
The Demonstration School of Muban Chombueng Rajabhat University (Pre-elementary)	MCRU	Ratchaburi	Pre-elementary	1971
The Demonstration School of Muban Chombueng Rajabhat University (Secondary)	MCRU	Ratchaburi	Secondary	2014
Demonstration School of Roi Et Rajabhat University	RERU	Roi Et	Pre-elementary–Elementary	2006
Demonstration School of Dhonburi Rajabhat University	DRU	Samut Prakan	Pre-elementary–Elementary	2010
Demonstration School, Songkhla Rajabhat University	SKRU	Songkhla	Pre-elementary–Elementary	1985
Demonstration School of Surindra Rajabhat University	SRRU	Surin	Pre-elementary–Secondary	1985
The Laboratory School of Ubon Ratchathani Rajabhat University	UBRU	Ubon Ratchathani	Pre-elementary	1999
Demonstration School, Udon Thani Rajabhat University	UDRU	Udon Thani	Pre-elementary–Secondary	1993
Demonstration School of Uttaradit Rajabhat University	URU	Uttaradit	Pre-elementary–Lower secondary	1986
Demonstration School of Yala Rajabhat University	YRU	Yala	Pre-elementary	1976
Demonstration Kindergarten, Rajamangala University of Technology Thanyaburi	RMUTT	Pathum Thani	Pre-elementary	1994
Innovations Demonstration School, Rajamangala University of Technology Thanyaburi	RMUTT	Pathum Thani	Elementary	2012
Satit Bilingual School of Rangsit University	RSU	Pathum Thani	Pre-elementary–Secondary	2004
Islamic Sciences Demonstration School	PSU	Pattani	Secondary	2014

== Other university-affiliated schools ==
Some universities also operated schools which are not primarily used for teacher training, and are not considered to be conventional sathit schools. However, these schools operate under similar administration systems and are often grouped along with them in official lists. Such schools include:

- Home Economics Kindergarten, Kasetsart University, Bangkok
- Darunsikkhalai School for Innovative Learning, King Mongkut's University of Technology Thonburi, Bangkok
- Somdej Ya Learning Community Demonstration School, Srinakharinwirot University, Chiang Mai
- Child Development Center, Lampang Rajabhat University, Lampang
- Child Development Center, National Institute for Child and Family Development, Mahidol University, Nakhon Pathom
- Mahidol University International Demonstration School, Mahidol University, Nakhon Pathom
- Vithidham School, Sakon Nakhon Rajabhat University, Sakon Nakhon
- Child Development Center, College of Medicine and Public Health, Ubon Ratchathani University, Ubon Ratchathani

== See also ==
- List of schools in Thailand
- List of universities and colleges in Thailand
