= Misiem Yipintsoi =

Painter and sculptor (b. 1906, d. 1988)

Misiem Yipintsoi (1906–1988) was a prominent Thai painter and sculptor. Despite a late start to her career (she did not start painting until age 42), she became one of Thailand's leading artists.

== Early life ==
Born in Siam in 1906, Misiem Yipintsoi was the daughter of ethnic Chinese-Indonesian parents. She was educated at the Assumption Convent School in Bangkok. She married shortly after completing her education, and raised five children.

== Artistic awakening ==
Yipintsoi had no formal training in art, but her interest in painting was piqued during a long stay in Denmark (where she spent 14 months while one of her children was being treated for polio). While in Denmark, she viewed many paintings, both in museums and the homes of friends, and purchased many paintings to decorate her home in Thailand. After returning to Thailand, she began studying painting at the age of 42 with Monet Satomi, a Japanese cultural attache to Thailand.

== Artistic career ==
Not long after she began studying painting, Yipintsoi submitted her painting 'Santikam' to Thailand's first National Exhibition of Art in 1949. She won a gold medal, and proceeded to win gold medals in the next two years as well for her paintings 'Honolulu' and 'Sriracha'. Though no longer eligible to compete afterwards, she continued to exhibit in the National Exhibition of Art annually through 1979. Yipintsoi later studied sculpture under the acclaimed Italian-Thai artist Silpa Bhirasri. After her death, Silpakorn University established a sculpture garden with many of her pieces. Other sculptures are collected in the Misiem Sculpture Museum in Nakhon Pathom province; her last sculpture, 'Coy Girl', unfinished at the time of her death, was stolen from that museum in 2015.

== Honors and legacy ==
Yipintsoi was awarded the Ordre des Arts et des Lettres in 1984 by the French Ministry of Culture, one of the first three Thais to receive the award. Silpakorn University awarded her an honorary Doctor of Arts degree in 1985. Her granddaughter, Klaomard Yipintsoi, continued her artistic legacy by funding exhibitions, happenings, and artists' workspaces.
