= Bangkok University (disambiguation) =

Bangkok University is a private university in Thailand.

Bangkok University may also refer to:

- Bangkok University Football Club, a former name of Bangkok United F.C.

== See also ==
- List of universities in Bangkok
- Bangkok Thonburi University
- Navamindradhiraj University, formerly University of Bangkok Metropolis
