= Suankularb Wittayalai Thonburi School =

Coordinates: 13.626781°N 100.470095°E

Location
- 201 Moo 6, Karnchanapisek Road (Bang Khun Thian - Phra Pradaeng Expressway), Tha Kham; Bangkhunthein District, Bangkok; Thailand

Information
- Type: Public secondary school
- Established: 2008; 18 years ago
- Director: Sarayut Rattanapanya
- Grades: 7–12 (Mathayom 1–6)
- Website: http://www.sk-thonburi.ac.th

Suankularb Wittayalai Thonburi School (S.K.T.) (Thai: โรงเรียนสวนกุหลาบวิทยาลัย ธนบุรี) is the tenth school affiliated with Suankularb Wittayalai. The school is a high school for grades 7 through 12 in Thailand under the management of Dr. Sarayut Rattanapanya, the second director of the school.

== History ==
Suankularb Wittayalai Thonburi School was originally the Bangmod Orange Orchard an area of approximate 12 acres which was donated by Miss Panadda Suwannanon. This was for charity on the Sixtieth Anniversary Celebrations of His Majesty King Bhumibol Adulyadej Rama IX's Accession to the Throne, and as a memorial to her father Mr. Plung Suwannanon who was Suankularb Wittayalai School Alumni. Miss Panadda Suwannanon donated this land to the Office of the Basic Education Commission (OBEC) for S.K.T. and construction began on September 21, 2006.

Eventually, S.K.T. School was established on August 8, 2008 by Mr. Visootr Kasemsuk who held the director position of Secondary Educational Service Area Office 1 (SESAO). Afterward, he was moved to another government agency, and Mr. Surasak Srisawangrat took this position until the groundbreaking ceremony of the first school building on May 20, 2010.

The school received their first students in secondary in 2009, a total of 245 students in 5 rooms. The following year 2010 and 2011, received another 200 students in 4 rooms. Because school buildings were under construction, they used Rattanakosinsompoch Bangkhunthian School for temporary study. At that time, the director of Rattanakosinsompoch Bangkhunthian School took the position of S.K.T. School director. Later on November 30, 2010, OBEC appointed Mr. Phisanu Sripon to take the position of school director. Then, all students moved to study at S.K.T. from 2012 onwards.

== Study Program ==
=== For Secondary (Grade 7–9) ===
- Intensive English Program (IEP)
- English Program (EP)
- Mini English Program (MEP)
- International Programme (IP) Cambridge Curriculum : SKTIP Curriculum which is adapted from Yothinburana School (International Programme) is purposively designed by the combination between Cambridge International Curriculum and Thai National Curriculum for the benefits of the students whose goal is destined to further their study in international-programme universities both in Thailand and overseas. They can get certificates of graduation from CIE (Cambridge International Examinations) and OBEC (Office of Basic Education Commission). Suankularb Wittayalai Thonburi School-International Programme offers 2 levels of study including:

	1. Lower Secondary Level: This is a 3-year curriculum for students aged 12–15 (Year 8 Year 10) with a lower secondary certificate (Mattayomsuksa 3) from OBEC (Office of Basic Education Commission). The students are required to take 88.0 credits for the level including 54.0 credits of fundamental subjects and 34.0 credits of additional subjects.  At the end of Year 8, the students are to take TOEFL Junior for English proficiency assessment.  At the end of Year 9, the students are to take TOEIC for English proficiency assessment and Checkpoint Tests in Mathematics, Science and English for checking their weaknesses and strengths before furthering higher level. And finally, at the end of Year 10, the students are to take CU-TEP for English proficiency assessment and IGCSE Mathematics.
	2. Upper Secondary Level: This is a 3-year curriculum for students aged 15–18 (Year 11-Year 13) with an upper secondary certificate (Mattayomsuksa 6) from OBEC (Office of Basic Education Commission).  The students are required to take 100.0 credits for the level including 44.0 credits of fundamental subjects and 66.0 credits of additional subjects. At the end of Year 11, the students are to take IELTS for English proficiency assessment.  They are also supposed to take IGCSE for at least 7 subjects during the level and get ICE (International Certificate of Education) from CIE (Cambridge International Examinations). At the end of Year 12 and Year 13, the students are to take GRE or SAT or CAT according to their readiness and interested field of study.  They are also supposed to take A-Level Exams for at least 4 subjects during the level from CIE (Cambridge International Examinations).

=== For Upper Secondary (Grade 10-12) ===
- Science - Mathematics
  - Gifted - This is an intensive program of study directly related to Mathematics and Science. Students have to study basic mathematics and basic science subjects in English. Only 34 students are accepted in this program per year.
  - Premium - This is an extra program related to the gifted program. This program is for students who had good scores when they took the examination for entrance in the gifted program, but not enough places were available. So, the school opened the premium program with a teaching curriculum similar to the gifted program, but students just have to study basic mathematics in English.
  - Normal
- Mathematics - English
- English - Chinese
- English - Japanese

== Classroom Styles ==
- Scientific Laboratory
- Computer Lab
- School Theater
- SKT Edutainment

== Schools Affiliated with Suankularb Wittayalai ==
1. Suankularb Wittayalai School
2. Suankularb Wittayalai Nonthaburi School
3. Nawamintrachinutit Suankularb Wittayalai Samutprakarn School
4. Nawamintrachinutit Suankularb Wittayalai Pathum Thani School
5. Suankularb Wittayalai Rangsit School
6. Suankularb Wittayalai Chonburi School
7. Suankularb Wittayalai Petchabun School
8. Suankularb Wittayalai Saraburi School
9. Suankularb Wittayalai (Jiraprawat) Nakornsawan School
10. Suankularb Wittayalai Thonburi School
11. Suankularb Wittayalai Nakhon Si Thammarat School
