= CHIJ Saint Theresa's Convent =

CHIJ Saint Theresa's Convent 圣婴德兰女中学校
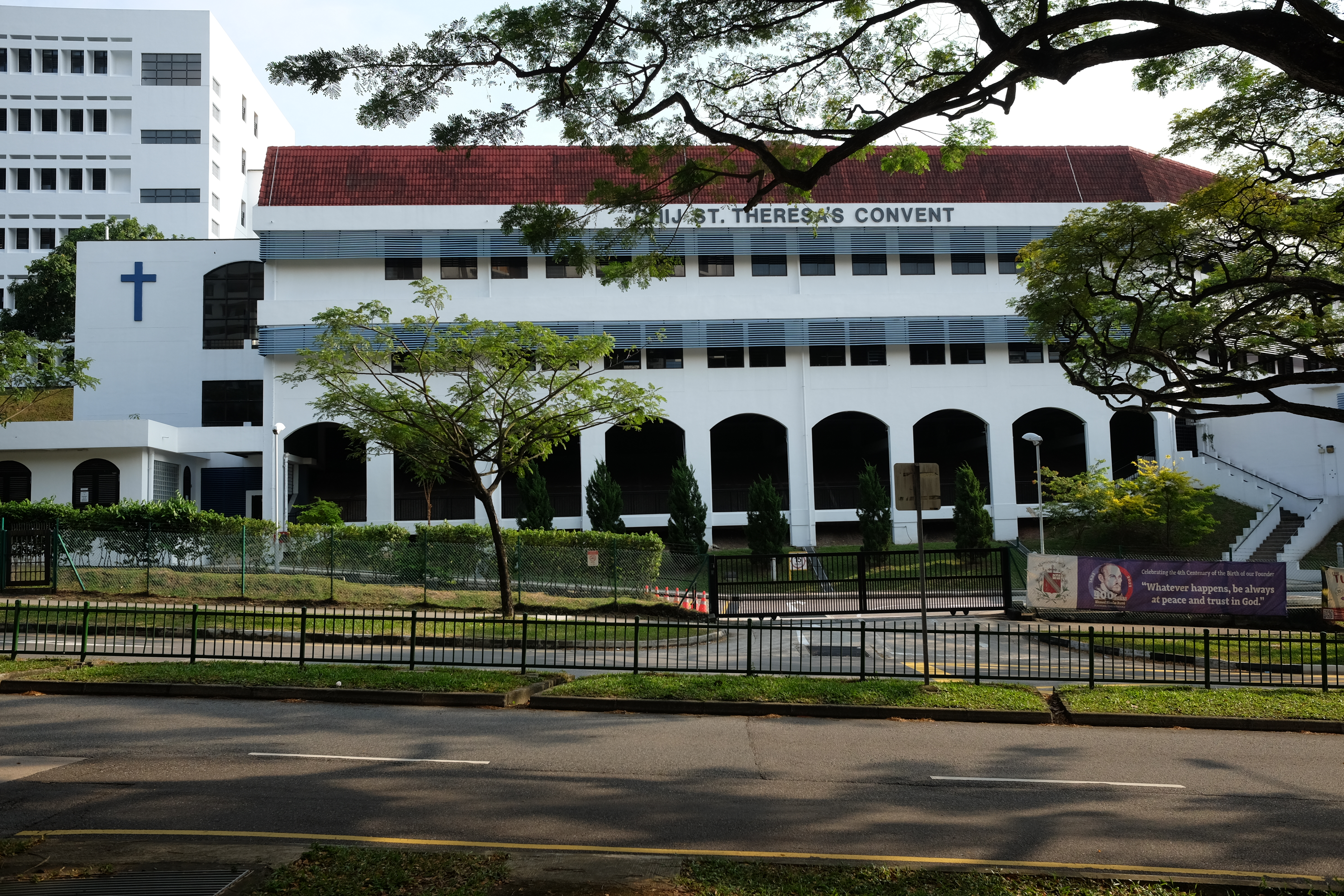

Location
- 160 Lower Delta Road; Singapore 099138; Singapore
- Coordinates: 1°16′33.1″N 103°49′19.4″E

Information
- Type: Government-aided
- Motto: Simple in Virtue, Steadfast in Duty
- Established: 1933; 93 years ago
- Session: Single session school code = 7023
- Principal: Jenny Leong
- Colour of Uniform: Blue White
- Website: www.chijsttheresasconvent.moe.edu.sg

CHIJ Saint Theresa's Convent is a government-aided Catholic girls' secondary school in Bukit Merah, Singapore. The school is one of 11 Convent of the Holy Infant Jesus (CHIJ) schools in Singapore.

== History ==
The school was founded in 1892, and was initially known as CHIJ Kampong Bahru. It began by running Parish classes of the Church of St. Theresa, taught by sisters of the Holy Infant Jesus Congregation. It grew to be an integrated school offering teaching in English and Tamil for primary-level students, who generally went on to the "Town Convent" CHIJ at Victoria Street (now CHIJ Toa Payoh) after leaving the school.

After World War II, the English and Tamil sections functioned at separate premises, before the school's present 12-acre (49,000 m^{2}) site at Lower Delta Road was purchased in 1948 and a new school building was completed in 1951. In 1952, the school's status was changed from a private school to a government-aided school. The Tamil section was phased out in 1953, and in the late-1950s the school began taking in secondary-level students.

The school's last intake of primary-level students was in 1986, after which the primary classes were phased out and the school became a secondary school.

In November 2009, the school moved out of its Lower Delta campus to the former New Town Secondary School campus at Queensway due to PRIME upgrading. The school has officially moved back as of 23 November 2011 and will function in its Lower Delta campus with new facilities such as an air-conditioned multi-purpose hall, an indoor sports hall, and a full-sized hockey pitch.

== Co-curricular activities and key programmes ==
The school offers a variety of co-curricular activities (CCA). The main groups are Sports, Performing Arts, Clubs and Societies, and Uniform Groups. They are: Hockey, Netball, Bowling, Tennis, Softball, Floorball, Track and Field, Angklung, Choir, Dance and Movement, Band, Guitar, Drama, Debates, National Police Cadet Corps, Girl Guides, IJ Youth Mission, Entrepreneurship Club and Infocomm Club.

CHIJ St Theresa's Convent's niche is Hockey, which the team has won many awards and competitions throughout the recent years. Since the 1960s, the school has been producing many players that are part of the national hockey team. Primary 6 students who excel in their school's hockey CCA can get into CHIJ St Theresa's Convent through Direct School Admission (DSA).

The Education For Life (EFL) programme has been part of the school's flagship programme which allows students to learn beyond the classroom. This is a camp that is held every year for all levels and is usually before the March Holidays in Singapore.

Leadership is also one of the key programmes of the school. The school has 3 Leadership Modules, Leadership Module 1-3. Leadership Module 1 is doing outdoor adventure and this is usually held overseas. In 2008, the students who attended this module went to New Zealand. Leadership Module 2 focuses on being a leader in society. Leadership Module 3, leadership through service, is by giving back to the community. For this third module, the students go to other countries such as Vietnam, Laos, Malaysia and Cambodia. The three different modules allows the student leaders of the school to gain better exposure of different challenges which can mould them into being better leaders.

== House system ==
The school incorporates a house system to foster unity and spirit among the students. These six team houses form the basis of competition at the school's annual Sports Carnival.

The houses are Catherine, Marie, Isabel, Caroline, Ignatius and Joseph. Each of the house names are named after former principals of the schools. Each of the houses represent a colour and an animal. Catherine represents yellow and an eagle, Marie represents purple and a pegasus, Isabel represents green and a dragon, Caroline represents blue and a white tiger, Ignatius represents red and a phoenix and Joseph represents orange and a griffin.

== Awards and accolades ==
In 2013, Anne Kingsley-Lee received the Inspiring Teacher of English Award from Indranee Rajah, Senior Minister of State for Education and Law, at a ceremony held at the National Museum of Singapore. The award honours outstanding teachers of English Language, English Literature and General Paper in Singapore.

The school won the Schools National B Division girls' hockey championship in 2015, 2016 and 2017. The three-year winning streak allowed them to keep the challenge trophy for 2017.
