= Assumption Suksa School =

Private Catholic school for girls in Bangkok

Coordinates: 13.72333°N 100.51607°E

Assumption Suksa School (AS) is the first school affiliated with the Roman Catholic Archdiocese of Bangkok. It is a private school for girls located in Bangkok, Thailand. Assumption Suksa School was founded by Pastor Leo Perudong. This school provides general education for students from kindergarten 1 to grade 12 including kindergarten, primary school, secondary school, and high school education.

== History ==
The history of Assumption Suksa School date back to the year 1933 when Pastor Leo Perudong was the rector of Assumption Cathedral. He built Assumption Suksa School which was known as Assumption Cathedral School. At that time, the children of the saints in Assumption Cathedral would attend this school by enrolling in the name of Assumption Convent School; mean that these children were in responsible of Assumption Convent School. There were just 65 children attend at the first time. The number of children continually increased, until the total number of students who were in responsible of Assumption Convent School was 1,757 students: 848 students were Assumption Convent School’s, but the other 909 students were Assumption Cathedral School’s. This number of students was large enough to build another school. So, Pastor Leo Perudong separated these schools, and named the separated school as “Assumption Suksa School”. Therefore, Assumption Suksa School was completely founded in 1953.

Assumption Suksa School continually improved since it was completely founded in 1953. It changed from being a coeducation school to a private school for girls. It provides many educational levels for students: kindergarten, primary school, secondary school, and high school education.

== Location ==
Assumption Suksa School is located at Charoen Krung 40 Alley, Charoen Krung road, Bangrak District, Bangkok, Thailand

== Curriculum ==
The school provides education from grades kindergarten 1 through grade 12.

- Kindergarten 1–3 and Primary School (Prathom 1–6)
- Lower Secondary School (Mattayom 1–3)
- Upper Secondary School (High School or Mattayom 4–6)
