= Low Kiok Chiang =

Chinese philanthropist (1843–1911)

Low Kiok Chiang (simplified Chinese: 卢克昌; traditional Chinese: 盧克昌 1843 – 12 March 1911), also known as Jacob to his contemporaries, was a successful businessman and prominent Catholic philanthropist in the late 19th and early 20th centuries in Singapore, Thailand (then called Siam) and China.

He played a major role in financing the construction of major Catholic infrastructure in Singapore, Bangkok and China, which is still in use today.

== Life ==
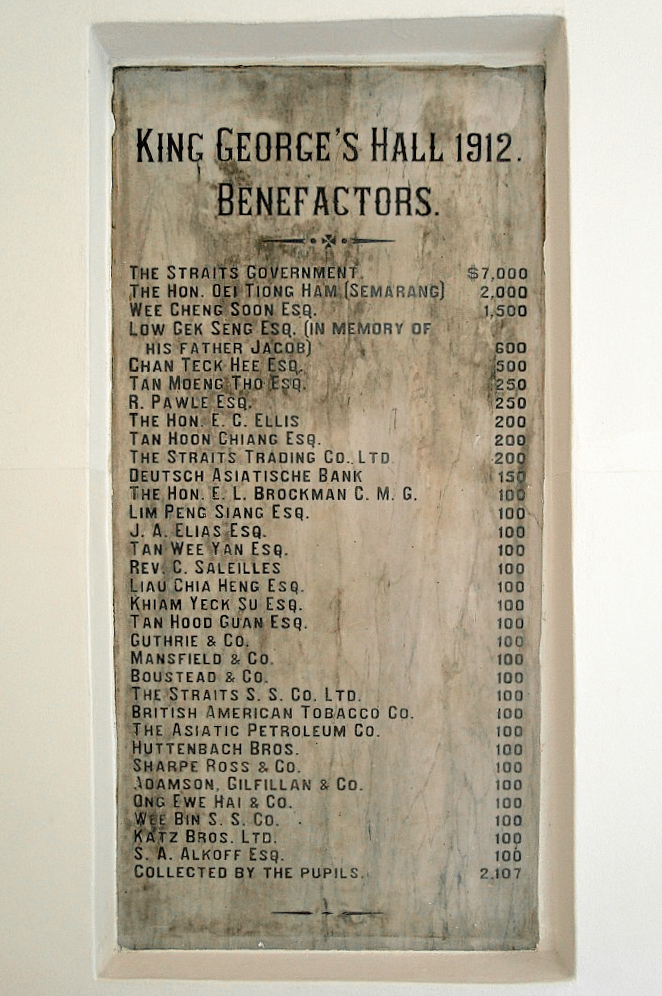
"Jacob" Low as mentioned by his son in this commemoration plaque at the former Saint Joseph's Institution, now the Singapore Art Museum.

Jacob Low was born in the South Chinese Guangdong province coastal town of Shantou (formerly Swatow) in 1843 in a Teochew family. Due to financial difficulties his family sent 2 sons to Singapore in search of work. Low, arriving in Singapore as a 16-year-old in 1859, had originally worked as a cook, and later as a clerical assistant at the French Catholic religious order Missions Étrangères de Paris (MEP) headquarters in Oxley Road, Singapore, from the 1850s. It was during his employ as a young man that the residing parish priest Fr Patria recognised promise in Low and advised the young man to relocate to Bangkok in Siam to start up a business venture. According to family sources the Catholic Church extended a generous loan to Low in order for him to see the plan through.

By 1872, Low established the retail/import-export firm Kiam Hoa Heng along the east bank of the Chao Phraya river in Bangkok. He did so with a childhood friend and now business partner Mr. Joseph Chan Teck Hee (Chinese: 曾德意 1845–1930). It was from their import-export business based in Bangkok, Kiam Hoa Heng and in 1883 Buan Hoa Seng in Singapore were set up. The Singapore side of this operation was overseen by Mr. John Goh Ah Seng (1851–1916).

In the 1880s, Kiam Hoa Heng received royal Siamese patronage from King Chulalongkorn himself. The story goes that one day a man walked into his shop with an entourage of people. No one knew who he was but one employee did recognise this person as the King. Low was at the local church for his daily afternoon prays and so missed this visit. After the visit the owner was invited to the royal palace to receive a plaque signifying royal patronage.

According to the Miramar shipping index website, Low commissioned a 1,100 ton powered ship, the 'Ban Hong Liong' in 1906. The ship was later sold and played a prominent role as a transport and logistics ship for British forces during the second World War.

Low Kiok Chiang died on 12 March 1911 from complications arising from blood poisoning due to an infection. His body was transported via steam ship from Bangkok to Singapore for burial. He was buried in a cemetery behind Singapore's Presidential Istana (Palace) which was exhumed in 1970 to make way for a park. His marble tombstone and body are now interred at the Choa Chu Kang Cemetery in Singapore.

By the second decade of the 20th century, the Low family network began linking up with other prominent Catholic Chinese philanthropist families such as the Wee (Ng) family, headed by David Wee Cheng Soon (1875–1944), who contributed heavily to the construction of the Church of St Theresa in 1929 (Singapore), the St Anthony's Church in 1927 (Singapore) and other Catholic infrastructure such as the school hall of St Joseph's Institution in 1911 (see photo). Wee ran a large construction company based in Stamford Road, Singapore city. Wee's company also constructed the Majestic Hotel (1932) now the National Art Gallery in Kuala Lumpur, Malaysia, and Singapore's first airport runway at the former Kallang Airport.

Immediate descendants live in Singapore, Thailand, the Netherlands, Spain, Australia, Italy and the UK.

== Contributing to Catholic expansion in Singapore, Bangkok and China ==
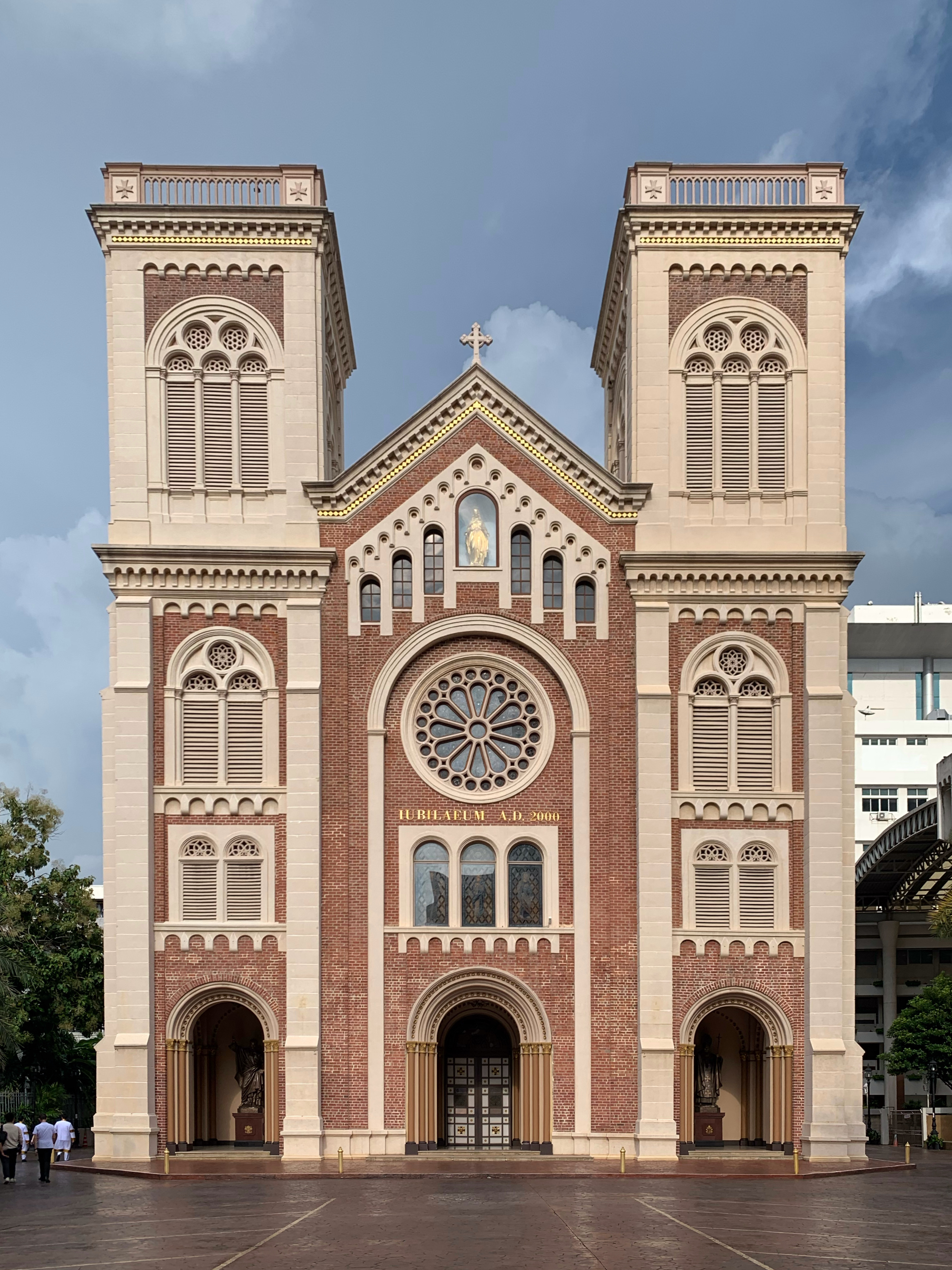
Assumption Cathedral, Bangkok

After having attained financial success, Jacobe Low donated large amounts of capital needed for the construction of local Chinese parishes and mission schools in Singapore, Bangkok and in Swatow China, especially between the mid-1890s to 1910. There is, however, no evidence to show if the Catholic Church had a direct say in the use of Mr. Low's business profits. From interviews with descendants in the 1970s and 1980s, it appears the reasons for doing so were totally personal. This wealthy patronage did not go unnoticed by some in the rival Protestant churches. Rev. J. A. Bethune Cook accused the Catholic Church in 1907 of conducting 'ordinary business houses in the name of Chinese traders and others.'

Much of Low's contributions were directed to the Catholic Church and its various instruments. In the late 19th century, Low single-handedly paid for restoration of damaged roofs at the Convent of the Holy Infant Jesus in the Singapore city precinct. His family and firm contributed several thousand dollars to Singapore's St Joseph's Institution. Kiam Hoa Heng also paid for refurbishments in the form of three large stained glass windows behind the altar, at the St Peter and Pauls Church in Queen Street, Singapore. In addition to this he gave large tracts of land and city-based properties to the Catholic Church in Bangkok. Around 1902, he paid for the construction of a church in his birthplace Shantou (formerly Swatow), in China, and during the Churches recent centennial celebrations, descendants of the Low family from London, Singapore and Bangkok were invited to the celebration there. The largest project funded by Low was the grand French Romanesque-revivalist Assumption Cathedral in Bangkok which still stands today. According to his daughter Veronica Low (b. April 1888 d. 4 Jan 1976), he was the primary financial sponsor to this Church, to a point where members of the Low family took on large cuts to their financial allowances. The cathedral was completed in 1909. His last project was the modest Church of the Sacred Heart in Tank Road, Singapore completed in 1910, one year before his death.
