= Church of the Sacred Heart, Singapore =

Church of the Sacred Heart
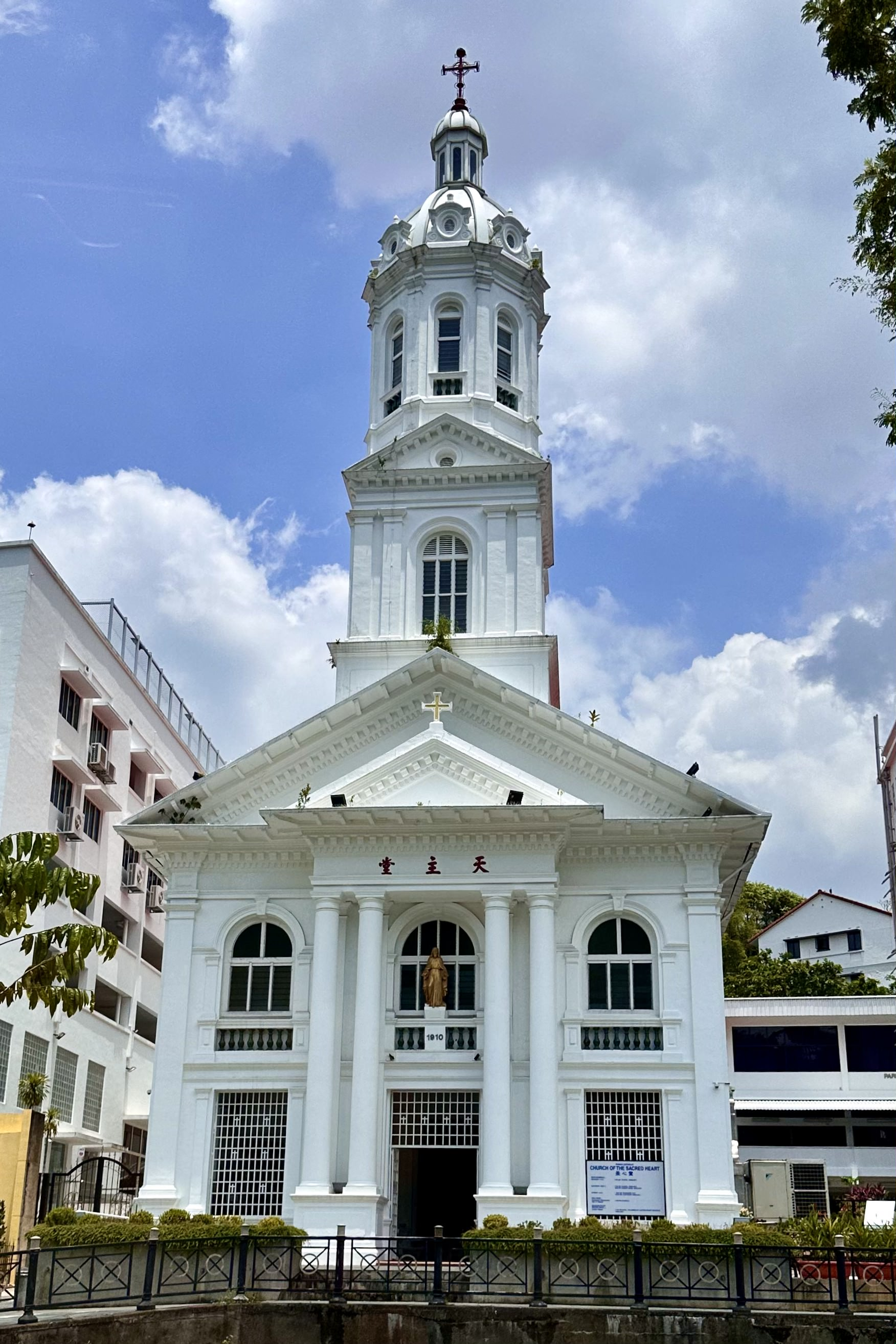
- Front of the main church building, taken from Clemenceau Avenue
- Church of the Sacred Heart
- Country: Singapore
- Denomination: Roman Catholic
- Website: churchofthesacredheart.sg

History
- Founded: 1910

Administration
- Diocese: Archdiocese of Singapore

Clergy
- Priest(s): Rev. Fr. Gregoire van Giang, MEP (Parish Priest)

The Church of the Sacred Heart (Chinese: 圣心堂) is a Roman Catholic church in Singapore. It was founded in 1910 and is one of the oldest parishes in the archdiocese. The church's feast day is the Solemnity of the Most Sacred Heart of Jesus, which falls 19 days after Pentecost Sunday.

== History ==
=== Founding ===
Fundraising for the church was begun in 1906 by the Saint Vincent de Paul Society, and the church was completed in 1910.

The finances for the construction were largely donated by three wealthy Chinese benefactors, one of which was Mr Jacobe Low Kiok Chiang (1843–1911), the founder of the Bangkok- and Singapore-based merchant firm Kiam Hoa Heng. Mr Low was of Teochew descent and was born in Shantou, China. The church was built to cater to the Cantonese-Hakka speaking congregation who had been worshipping at the Church of Saint Peter and Saint Paul prior to the church's opening.

On 15 February 1942, the church's roof was damaged by Japanese artillery fire coming from Johor Bahru.

=== Improvements ===
The church was first renovated in 1969, and a three-storey Parish Welfare Hall was established on 21 February 1971. In 1994, the church was renovated again and repainted to the present day white colour to celebrate the 40th Priestly Ordination Anniversaries of the 3 priests attached to the church at that time, parish priest Rev Fr Bonaventure Tung OFM, assistant priests Rev Fr Paul Tong and Rev Fr Joseph Chao. Prior to the completion of the new Community Building in 2010, the top level was used for catechism classes, the second level was a canteen, while the ground level housed a small car park and a room used by the Saint Vincent De Paul Society.

In 2002, the church was renovated once again by parish priest Rev Fr Paul Tay. In 2010, a seven-and-a-half-storey community building which houses meeting, catechism and prayer rooms, priest offices, as well as a new cafeteria, was completed and blessed by His Grace, Archbishop Nicholas Chia to cater to the needs of the parishioners. A columbarium was also constructed directly behind the main church building. Previously, Fr Tay was also involved in the construction of a columbarium in the Church of St Theresa, as well as the establishment of the Church of the Holy Trinity, which has since become the largest parish in Singapore.

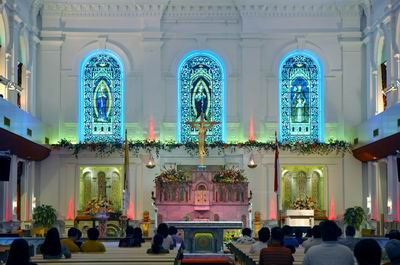
Interior of the main church building

== Present ==
The church comprises a main church building, where Masses are celebrated, a three-storey Parish Welfare Hall, as well as a seven-and-a-half-storey Community Building which sits on freehold land beside the church. The land was vacant for many years but has now been put to good use.

== Community building ==
In 2010, a seven-and-a-half-storey church community building was completed to fulfil the needs of the parish community. Costing an estimated S$4.5 million, the building was constructed on freehold land and was completed in 2008 with a total floor area of 3,100 square metres. It was designed to blend in with the facade and structure of two existing shop-houses.

The building currently houses meeting, catechism and prayer rooms, a music studio, a cafeteria and refreshment area, priest offices, a religious bookshop, as well as carparks on the 1st, 4th and 5th storeys. Directly next to the multi-purpose hall, where the cafeteria is now located, is a chapel, which is now used for weekday Masses celebrated from Monday to Thursday. Masses on Friday, as well as special feast days that fall on weekdays continue to be celebrated in the main church building. These days include holy days of obligation such as Maundy Thursday, Good Friday and All Souls' Day, among others.

Following his appointment as Apostolic Nuncio to Singapore in January 2011, Archbishop Leopoldo Girelli briefly resided in the church's community building, which also acted as the Vatican Embassy in Singapore.

== See also ==
- Catholic Church in Singapore
- List of Roman Catholic churches in Singapore
