= Assumption Cathedral, Bangkok =

Cathedral of the Catholic Archdiocese of Bangkok

Coordinates: 13°43′23″N 100°30′54″E

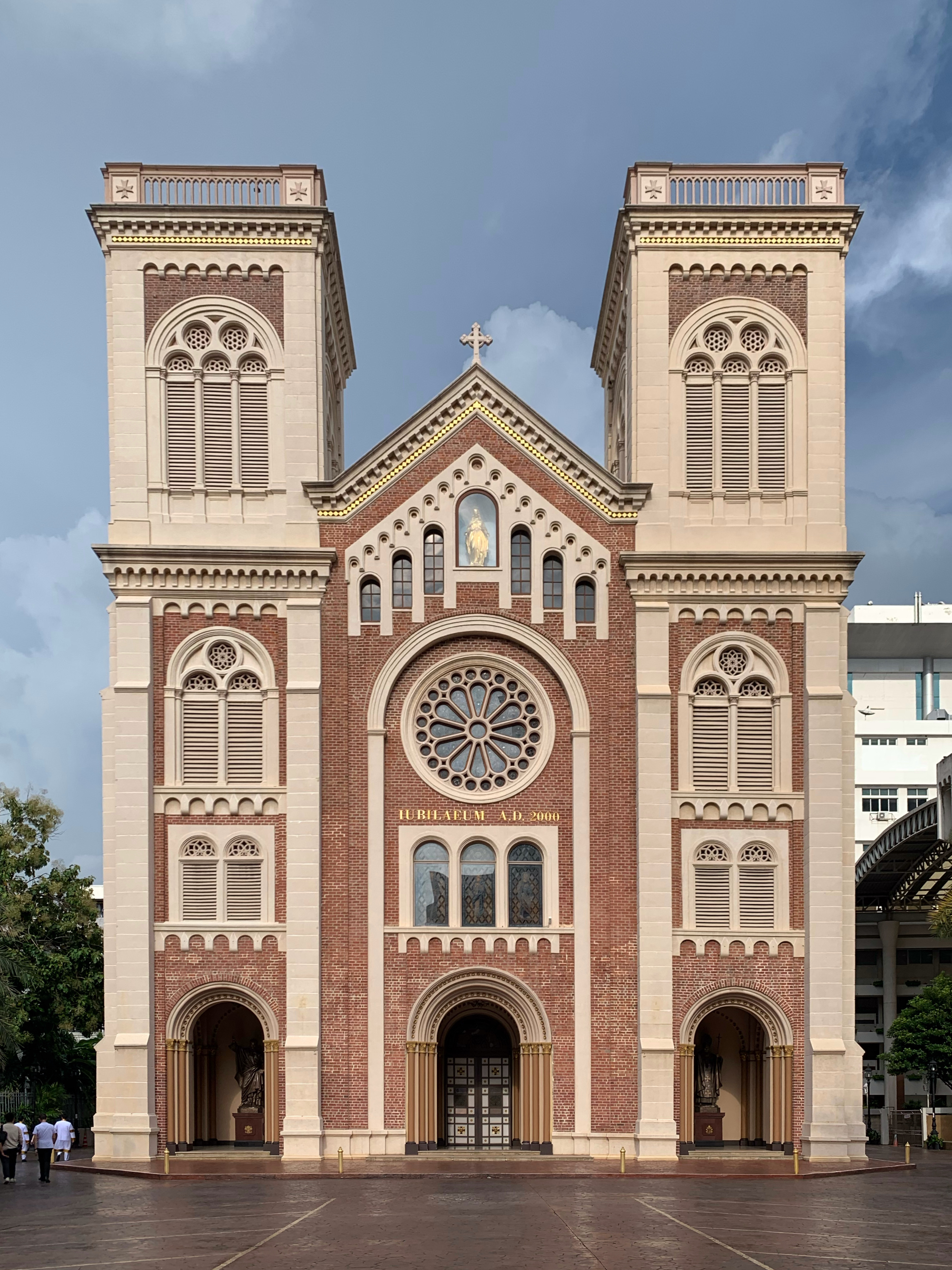
- Western facade of the Assumption Cathedral in September 2023

Religion
- Affiliation: Catholic
- Diocese: Archdiocese of Bangkok
- Ecclesiastical or organizational status: Active
- Leadership: Archbishop Francis Xavier Vira Arpondratana

Location
- Location: 23 Oriental Avenue, Charoen Krung Road, Bang Rak, Bangkok, Thailand
- Interactive map of Assumption Cathedral, Bangkok

Architecture
- Style: Romanesque
- Completed: 1821
- Direction of façade: East and West Axes

Website
- Official website of Assumption Cathedral, Bangkok

The Assumption Cathedral (Thai: อาสนวิหารอัสสัมชัญ) is the principal Catholic church of Thailand, located at 23 Oriental Avenue, New Road, in the Bang Rak District of Bangkok. It is the main church of the Archdiocese of Bangkok. The cathedral hosted both of the papal visits to Thailand: Pope John Paul II in 1984 and Pope Francis in 2019.

== History ==
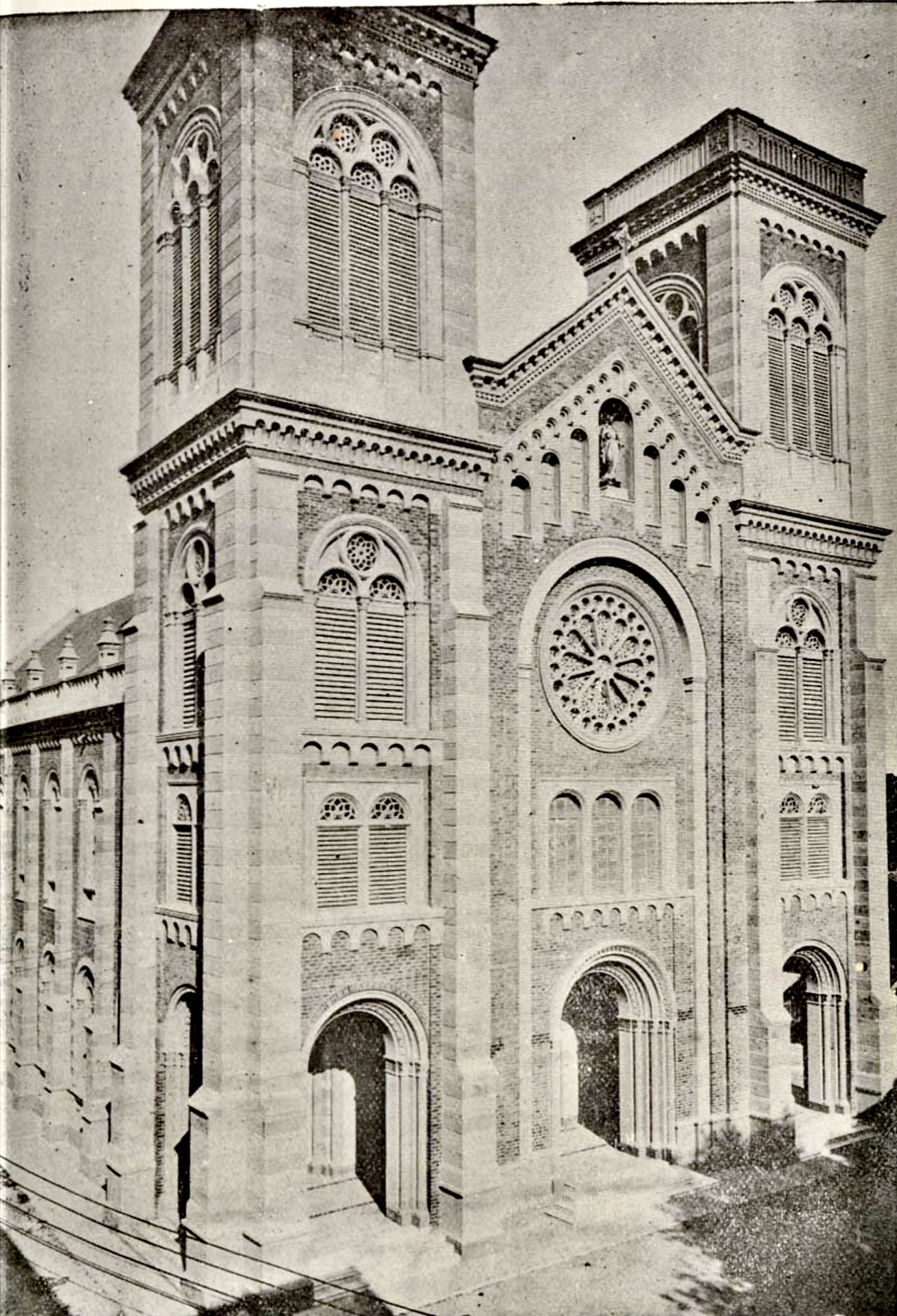
Assumption Cathedral in 1922

The Assumption Cathedral is located within 100 meters of the Oriental Hotel and the French Embassy, and the original building was the result of the request from a French missionary, Father Pascal in 1809 and the work of a French architect which saw the cathedral completed in 1821 during the reign of King Rama II. The cathedral was named Assumption after the Virgin Mary and she is commemorated at the church during The Feast of the Assumption, on St. Mary's Day on 15 August.

Throughout the latter half of the 19th century, the church and surrounding area played an important role for Christian missionaries arriving in Bangkok, particularly after 1860. The cathedral is part of a series of buildings which consist of Assumption Convent School (Thailand), Catholic Mission of Bangkok, Assumption Printing Press and rectory which were inhabited by the missionaries during their time in the city.

However around 1909 or 1910 the church underwent significant reconstruction and was rebuilt in the romanesque style between 1910 and 1918. The church has a relatively tall rectangular structure with a red brick exterior which stands out against its surrounding white buildings. The tall square towers flank the main entrance. Inside is a high ceiling adorned with many ornate decorations. Construction costs were largely covered by a local catholic businessman, Mr Low Khiok Chiang (also known as Jacobe) who owned the nearby Kiam Hoa Heng & Company, a Chinese Teochew family business.

In 1942, during World War II, nearby buildings were destroyed by allied bombing which resulted in serious damage to the church. It underwent extensive restoration shortly afterwards, and was partly refurbished in the 1980s and 1990s. Stained glass windows are now used in the cathedral today.

The Assumption Cathedral had been visited by two supreme pontiffs. First, in May 1984 the cathedral welcomed Pope John Paul II and on the 22nd of November 2019, Pope Francis visited the cathedral during his apostolic visit to Thailand where he conduct the holy mass with catholic youth from around the country, given that the church is the center of the Catholic diocese there.

The church is open only on Saturday and Sunday. Services for mass on Sundays are held at 8:30am, 10am (English mass) and 5pm, with Novena followed by Saturday anticipated mass at 4:30pm every Saturday. For weekday, including Saturday, the mass is celebrated at 6am in the chapel located on the south side of the cathedral, in the area of Assumptionsuksa School.

== Crypt ==
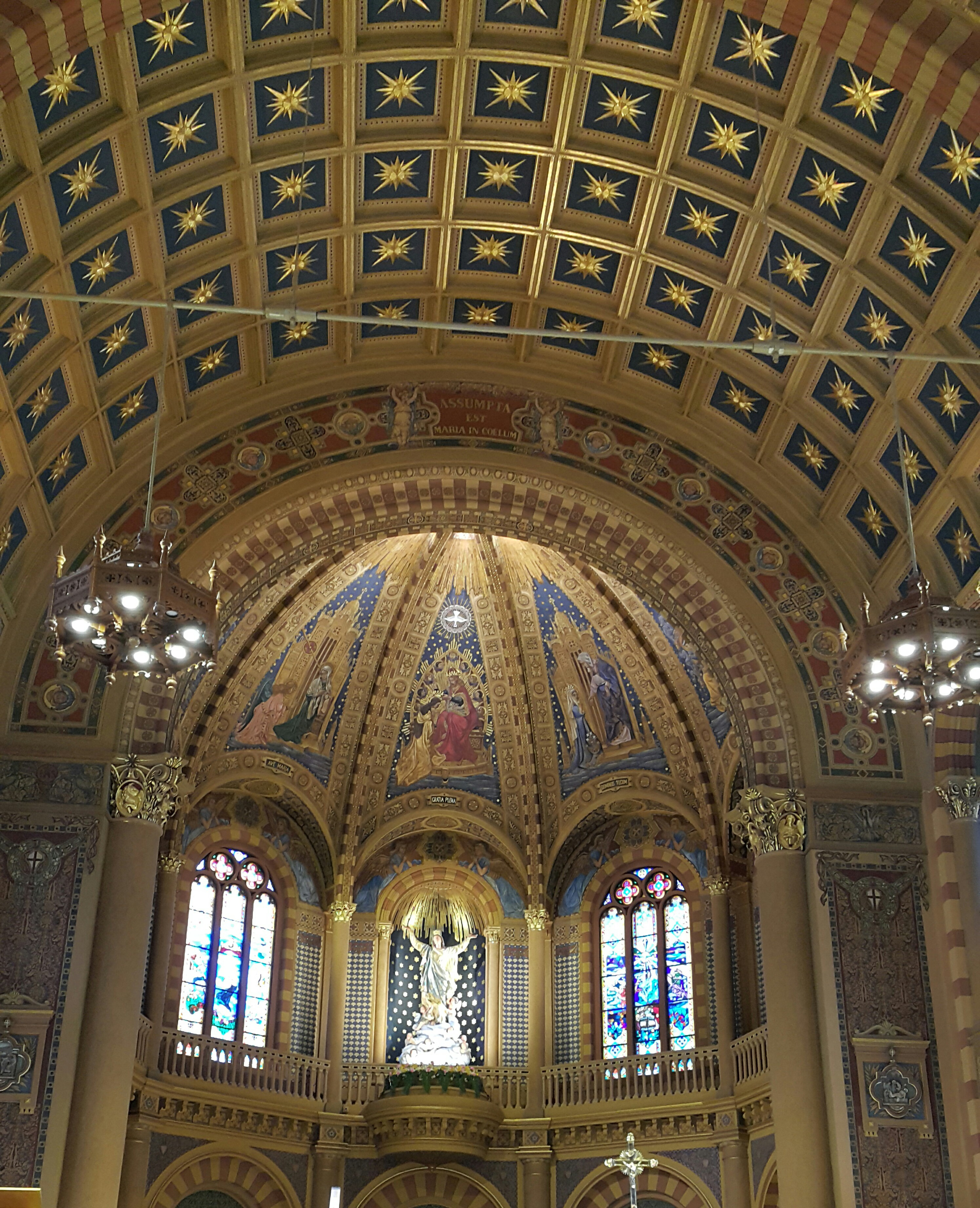
Interior of the Assumption Cathedral

The significant part of the cathedral is in the crypt underneath the Sanctuary, which kept the remains of the bishops and the missionaries, including that of Fr Nicholas Boonkerd Kitbamrung, who was proclaimed a martyr by Pope John Paul II on 5 March 2000 in the Vatican. His relics were transferred to the shrine built in the compound of St. Peter's church in Sampran, Nakornprathom Province. There still remains a special altar devoted to him on the left side of the cathedral.

Besides being a place of worship and for performing sacred ceremonies, the role of the Assumption Cathedral is the church of the head of the local diocese, which as of 2025 was led by Francis Xavier Vira Arpondratana. The cathedral is used to celebrate functions such as ordination of deacons, priests and bishops, and is said to be the centre of Catholics in Thailand.

== Notable visitors ==
Visitors include, on 4 May 1946, King Ananda Mahidol with his younger brother, then-Prince Bhumibol Adulyadej. Pope John Paul II visited on 10 May 1984. On 22 July 1995, Princesses Soamsawali and Bajirakitiyabha visited the cathedral during a religious ceremony for the soul of the late king's mother. In 2002 the crown prince Vajiralongkorn and his consort Srirasmi visited the Catholic community at the Assumption Cathedral.

The cathedral hosted both of the papal visits to Thailand: Pope John Paul II in 1984 and Pope Francis in 2019.

== Nearby sites ==
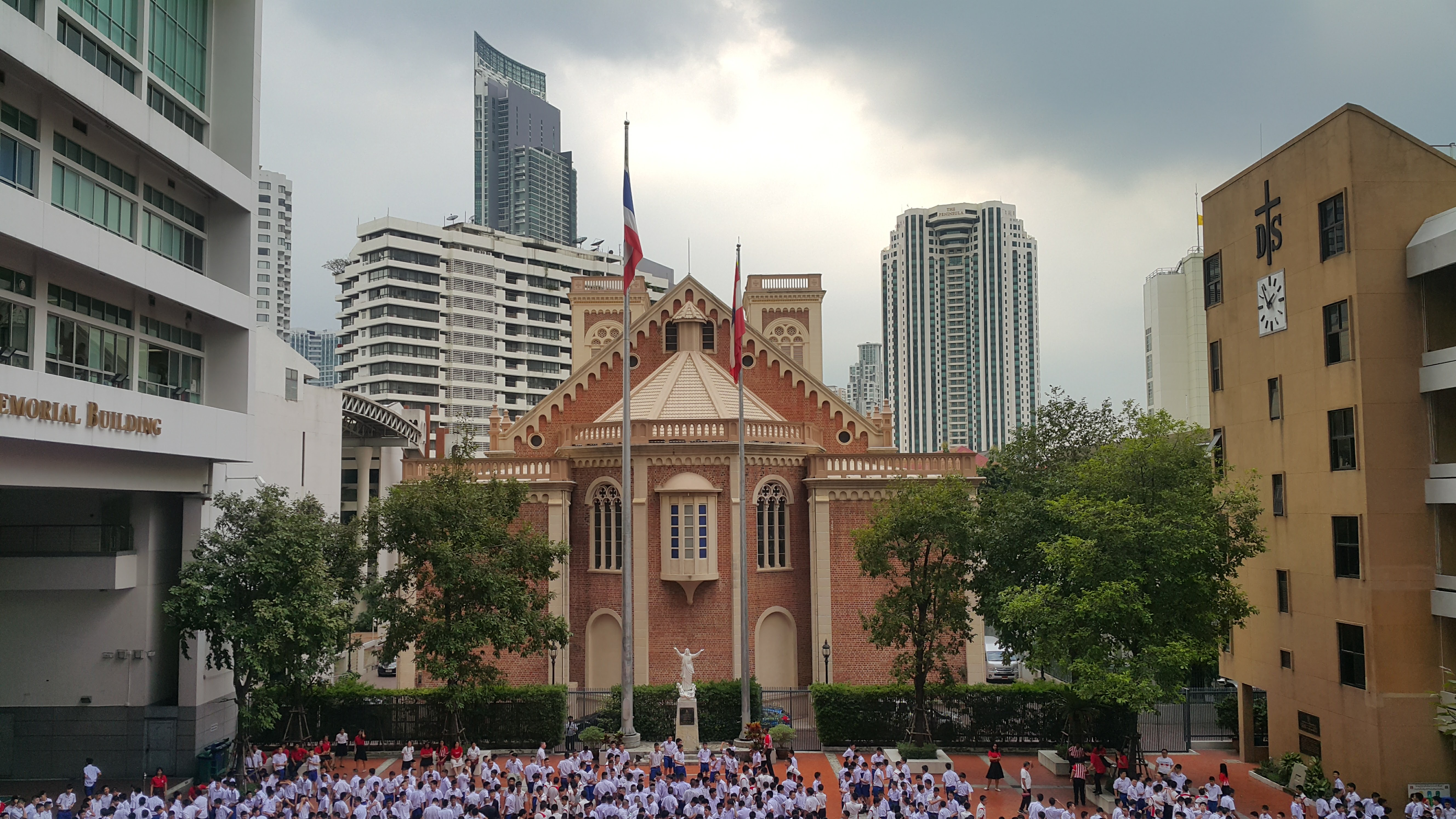
The eastern facade of the cathedral, taken from the neighbouring Assumption College

Three schools are situated in the compound of the cathedral: Assumption College, Assumption Convent School and Assumption Suksa School. There used to be a seminary and a printing house. Many offices of the Catholic organizations used to be nearby the cathedral.

== Events ==
A ceremony held in the cathedral was that of the proclamation of Blessed Father Nicholas Boonkerd as Priest and Martyr.

== See also ==
- Catholic Church in Thailand
