= Chinorotwittayalai school =

Chinorotwittayalai School

Location
- 45, Itsaraphap Road, Ban Chang Lo, Khet Bangki; Bangkok; Thailand; 13.747976°N 100.478809°E

Information
- Type: Public secondary school
- Established: 1895
- Founder: Supreme Patriarch Paramanuchitchinorot
- Authority: Office of the Basic Education Commission
- Director: Serm Wanpakdee
- Grades: 7–12 (Mathayom 1–6)
- Gender: United school
- Website: www.chinorot.ac.th

Chinorotwittayalai School (also known as Wat Chinorot School) (Thai: โรงเรียนชิโนรสวิทยาลัย) is a co-education school for grades 7 through 12 in Wat Chinorasaram Woravihara, Thailand.

The school was founded by Somdej Phra Maha Somanachao Krom Phra Poramanuchit Chinoros in 1895.

== History ==
The princely monk, Somdej Phra Maha Somanachao Krom Phra Poramanuchit Chinoros ordered the construction of the temple in approximately 1836 (at that time Somdej Phra Maha Somanachao Krom Phra Poramanuchit Chinoros already died. He was born on December 11, 2333, died 2396).
