= Church of St Teresa, Singapore =

Roman Catholic church in Singapore

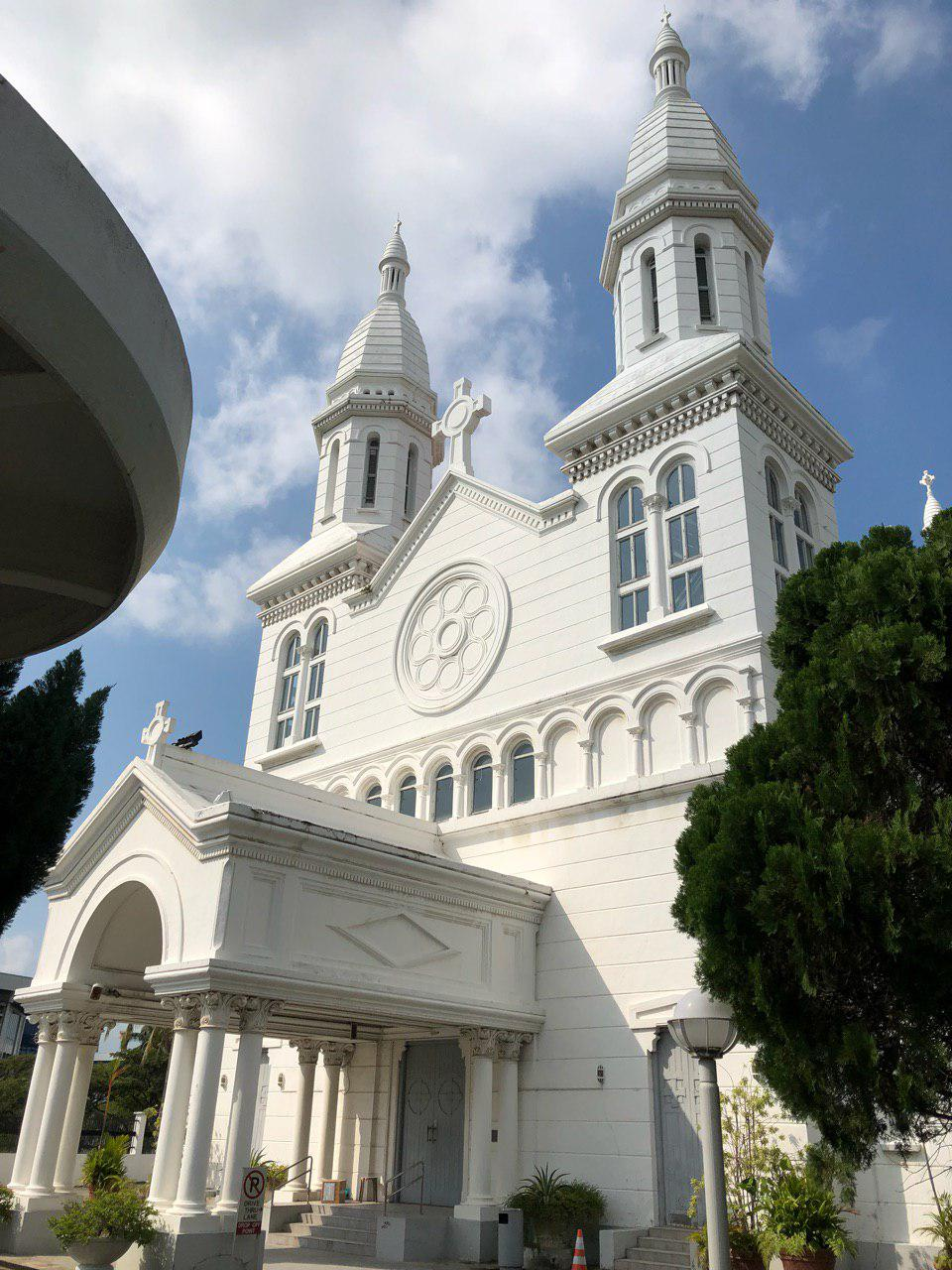

- Location within Singapore
- 1.2732919°N 103.8259366°E
- Location: 510 Kampong Bahru Road, Singapore 099446

History
- Built: 7 April 1929; 97 years ago

Site notes
- Architect: Emile Brizay
- Architectural style: Romano-Byzantine
- Governing body: National Heritage Board
- Website: https://www.stteresa.org.sg/

National monument of Singapore
- Designated: 11 November 2009; 16 years ago
- Reference no.: 57

The Church of St. Teresa is a Roman Catholic church in Singapore. The church was established in 1929 on the eastern slope of Bukit Purmei in Kampong Bahru, making it Singapore's first rural church. It was gazetted by the National Heritage Board as a National monument on 11 November 2009.

== History ==
=== Origins ===
At the end of the nineteenth century, the only church that served the Chinese Catholic community in Singapore was the Church of Saints Peter and Paul. Even so, the church was continuously packed on Sundays, feast days and other special occasions, and it was largely a Teochew-speaking congregation.

In 1910, Bishop Emile Barillon wrote back to the Paris Foreign Missions Society (MEP), mentioning that the Church in Singapore "foresees that a third Chinese parish would become necessary for the Catholics originating from Fukien who have multiplied more and more.” During that time, there were a few hundred Hokkien-speaking Christians. Conversions within this dialect group were few as they had no church of their own, and as such there was a need to build a church catered to the Hokkien community.

In 1923, Father Emile Joseph Mariette, who was then the parish priest of the Church of Saints Peter and Paul, suggested to the MEP to build this new church, and thus they began the search for a suitable site. On 21 November 1925, the Church acquired 2.1 acres of land at Bukit Purmei, which at that time was a large tract of undeveloped and dismal marshland occupied by Malay Squatters and Catholic families. During that period, this plot of land was near Outram General Hospital as well as Tanjong Pagar Railway Station, which was still undergoing construction then. The cost of the land amounted to $26,000, and the building fund took about a quarter of a million dollars, all of which was contributed by the MEP and prominent Chinese Catholics.

The building was based on the sketches of Father Jean Marie Ouillon, and his design was heavily inspired by the Basilica of the Sacred Heart in Montmarte, which was also built on a hill. The foundation stone was laid on Easter Monday, 18 April 1927, by Pierre Louis Perrichon, Bishop of Corona and Coadjutor to the Bishop of Malacca.

During the construction, Father Mariette was inspecting the construction progress on site when a plank fell from the top of the steeple and hit him on his head. He was rushed to Outram General Hospital, but died soon after. Up till this day, a marble plaque stands dedicated to him near where the accident took place. Father Stephen Lee was then tasked to supervise the rest of the building project, and subsequently became the parish priest in 1930.

=== Early Church ===
The church was completed and officially opened on 7 April 1929 to much fanfare, with a crowd of approximately 6,000 people. As church members believed that the land was acquired through the intercession of St Teresa of the Child Jesus, it was decided that the church should be named after her, and that she be made its patron saint.

However soon after the opening, the Church struggled to remain open due to its low attendance rates. Due to the lack of developed infrastructure surrounding the Church, people found it inaccessible and hence continued to attend services at the more conveniently located Church of Saint Peter and Paul. Thus, the services at the Church of St Teresa were highly irregular, and at one point had only 4 services in a year. It ultimately failed to cater to the Hokkien Catholic community, but its parish population slowly grew due to the patronage of workers from the dockyards, as well as staff and patients from the Singapore General Hospital.

=== Developments ===
In June 1930, the government acquired a portion of land in front of the church to make way for the deviation of Kampong Bahru Road and the Federated Malay States Railway, resulting in the loss of more than 8,000 square feet of its frontage. Soon after in 1934, the Catholic Church acquired the surrounding land and a Catholic settlement quickly developed around the Church, helping the parish population grow.

In 1935, Father Lee founded St Teresa's Sino-English Primary School to provide education for the children living in the vicinity. The school was renamed St Teresa's Sino-English School when secondary students enrolled in 1965. The school later became St Teresa's High School, which closed in 1998. It was the Chinese-medium counterpart of CHIJ Saint Theresa's Convent, which was run by the Holy Infant Jesus sisters and provided English and Tamil-medium education for girls.

During the Japanese Occupation (1942–1945), Bukit Teresa became the British military's anti-aircraft post. Due to the church's proximity to Bukit Teresa and the port, it was attacked frequently by the Japanese. Both the church and the buildings in the Catholic settlement sustained heavy damage during the bombings. When the war ended, Father Lee oversaw the task of rebuilding the church from the ravages of war.

During the post-war period, the Church was a place of refuge for many groups in society who had fallen through the cracks. The church opened its doors to women who sought protection from Japanese soldiers, Caucasians during the Maria Hertogh riots, and the homeless from the Bukit Ho Swee Fire.

The Church of St Teresa was gazetted as a national monument on 11 November 2009.

== Architecture ==
The Church of St Teresa is the only building in Singapore that features Romano-Byzantine architecture. The building was based on the sketches of Father Jean Marie Ouillon, and his design was heavily inspired by the Basilica of the Sacred Heart in Montmarte, Paris, France. Emile Brizay, who also designed the Former Ford Factory, prepared the final architectural plans under Brossard Mopin Malaya Co Pte Ltd.

The windows on the sides of the church are set within arches and are adorned with decorative designs comprising a cross within a circle. These windows, together with the clerestory windows, provided ventilation for the church interior before air-conditioners were installed. The baldachin over the high altar was designed by Swan & Maclaren Architects. Supported by tall columns, each of the pediments at the top of the structure has a circular wreath design in the centre.

=== Bells ===
In November 1927, 5 bronze bells were donated by devout parishioner Joseph Chan Teck Hee and named after his children. Each bell is of a different size and tuned in five different tones, and when struck form a harmonized music chord. They were cast by the Cornille-Harvard Bell Foundry at Villedieu-les-Poeles, Normandy, France in the papacy of Pope Pius XI.

=== Stained glass ===
The French-made stained glass windows were installed at the back of the sanctuary in 1931. The three windows, with six panels each, chronicle the life of the Patron Saint, St Therese of Lisieux, France.

== See also ==
- CHIJ Saint Theresa's Convent
- Catholic Church in Singapore
