= Office of the Basic Education Commission =

Thai government agency

Office of the Basic Education Commission of Thailand
- สำนักงานคณะกรรมการการศึกษาขั้นพื้นฐาน

Department overview
- Formed: 2003
- Type: Ministerial department
- Jurisdiction: Government of Thailand
- Headquarters: Bangkok, Thailand
- Department executive: Acting Sub Lt. Thanu Wongjinda, Secretary-General
- Parent department: Ministry of Education
- Website: www.obec.go.th

The Office of the Basic Education Commission (OBEC) is a Thai governmental agency, founded in 2003. It is an office of the Thai Ministry of Education (MOE). Its mission is to organize and promote basic education from primary school to high school.

== History ==
The Office of the Basic Education Commission (OBEC) was formed by combining the Department of General Education of Office of the National Primary Education Commission and the Office of Private Education Commission of the Ministry of Education.

On about October 2021, its website was compromised by an individual identifying themselves as "WarotS". There they posted bomb threats against the Chinese consulate general in San Francisco and the headquarters office of American instant messaging company Discord.

== Departments ==
The Office of the Basic Education Commission has agencies in each region including an Education Service Area Office in 181 areas and 16 central agencies. They are:

- Bureau of General Administration
- Bureau of Financial
- Bureau of Monitoring and Evaluation
- Bureau of Educational Testing
- Bureau of Technology for Teaching and Learning
- Bureau of Policy and Planning
- Bureau of Special Education Administration
- Bureau of Educational Innovation Development
- Bureau of Personnel Administration Development and Legal Affairs
- Bureau of Student Activities Development
- Bureau of Teachers and Basic Education Personnel Development
- English Language Institute
- Upper Secondary Education Bureau
- Bureau of Education Development for a Special Administrative Zone in Southern
- Public Sector Development Group
- Internal Auditing Unit
- Center for Science High School Development
