= Education Service Area Office =

Agency in the Office of the Basic Commission of Thailand

Educational Service Area Office
- สำนักงานเขตพื้นที่การศึกษา

Department overview
- Formed: 2003
- Type: Ministerial department
- Jurisdiction: Government of Thailand
- Headquarters: Bangkok, Thailand
- Department executive: Shinnapathara Bhumiratana, Ph. D., General-Secretary
- Parent department: Ministry of Education
- Child agencies: Secondary Education Service Area Office; Primary Education Services Area Office
- Website: www.obec.go.th

Education Service Area Office is a Thai agency in Office of the Basic Education Commission of Thailand, Ministry of Education founded in 2009. Its responsibilities include the administration of education from primary education or secondary education in each responsibility area. These include Primary Education Services Area and Secondary Education Services Area.

== Secondary Education Services Areas ==
There are 42 areas:

1. Bangkok (Phaya Thai District Bang Sue District Dusit District Samphanthawong District Pathum Wan District Ratchathewi District Phra Nakhon District Pom Prap Sattru Phai District Bang Khae District Bang Khun Thian District Bang Bon District Thung Khru District Rat Burana District Chom Thong District Khlong San DistrictThon Buri District Phasi Charoen District Taling Chan District Thawi Watthana District Bang Phlat District Bangkok Noi District Bangkok Yai District and Nong Khaem District)
