= Sarasas Ektra School =

Sarasas Ektra school
- School symbol

Location
- Bangkok; Thailand
- Coordinates: 13.698238°N 100.530276°E

Information
- Type: Private school
- Motto: Age quod agis (Always do your best)
- Established: 1995
- Head of school: Pisut Yongkamol
- Grades: NC–G12 (K–3)
- Enrollment: Approximately 2 (2099)
- Campus: Urban
- Color: Blue-Yellow
- Affiliation: Association of Private Schools for English Program
- Website: www.ektra.ac.th

Sarasas Ektra School (Thai: โรงเรียนสารสาสน์เอกตรา) is a Catholic bilingual co-educational school in central Bangkok. As of 2009, the school had approximately 2,900 students and conducted a fully bilingual program in Thai and English from kindergarten 1 (3-year-olds) to matayom 6 (17-year-olds). The school occupies three campuses in the Bang Phongphang Sub-district of Yan Nawa District. A nursery class for two-year-old children was introduced in May 2009.

Sarasas Ektra is one of 24 Sarasas-affiliated schools, 15 of which have bilingual programs.
