= Enconcept E-Academy =

Enconcept
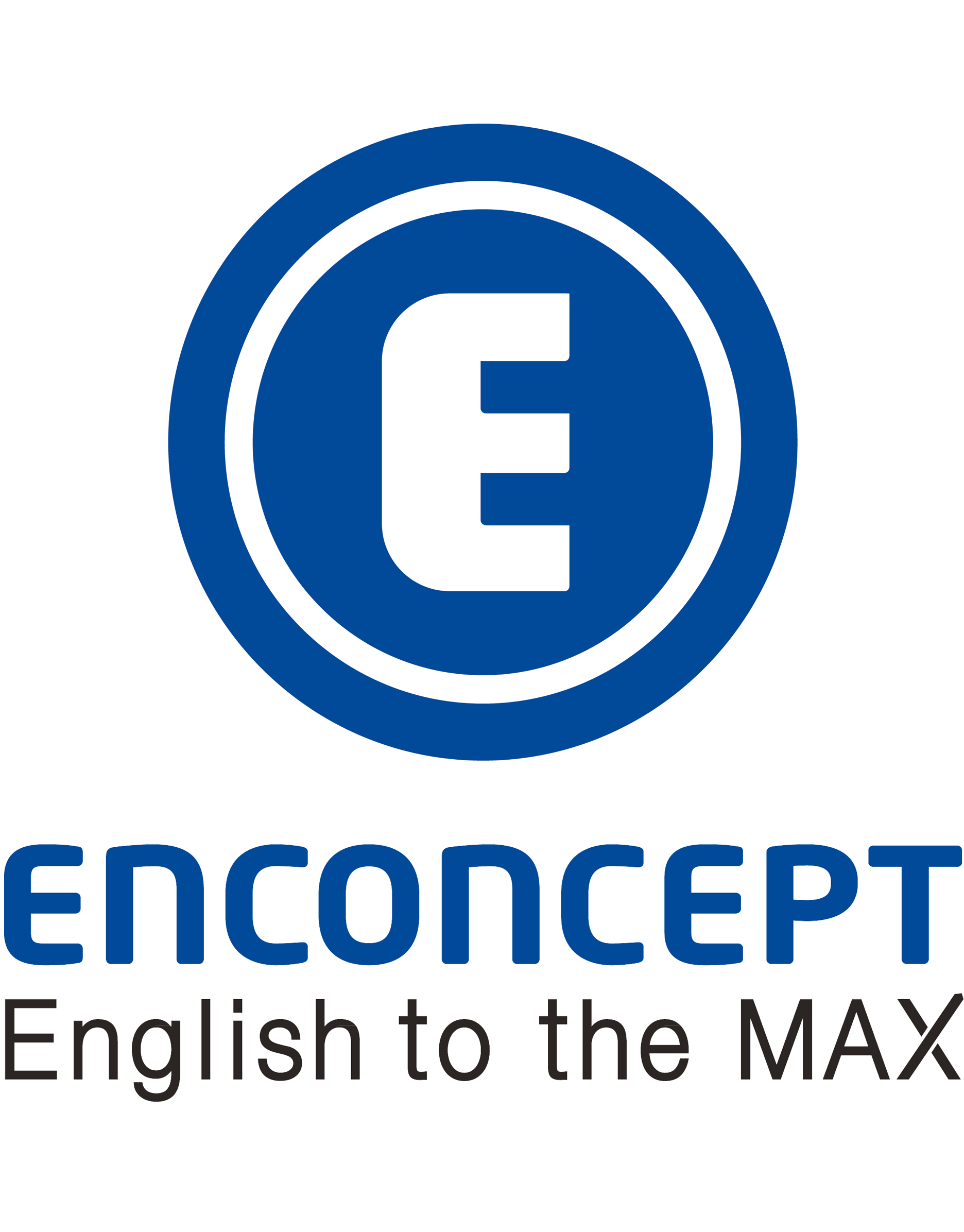
- Enconcept

Location
- LearnBalance Building, 2991/52-53, Soi Ladprao 101/3, Ladprao Road, Klongchan Sub-district, Bangkapi District, Bangkok; Thailand; 13.774094°N 100.632286°E

Information
- Type: Tutorial school
- Motto: English to the MAX
- Established: March 1995
- School district: Bangkok
- Principal: Dr. Dhammasak Ua-Apithorn
- Grades: 7–12
- Color
- Information: 662-736-3600
- Website: www.enconcept.com

Enconcept E-Academy (Thai: th:โรงเรียนเอ็นคอนเส็ปท์ อี แอคเคเดมี่) is an English language tutorial school under the Office of the Private Education Commission, Ministry of Education, Thailand. Its main office is located at LearnBalance Building, Bangkok, Thailand.

Enconcept E-Academy was established by Tanate Ua-Apithorn and Arisara Tanapakit in March 1995. Dhammasak Ua-Apithorn is general manager.

The academy has 40 branches nationwide.

== History ==
=== First era (1995-1999) ===
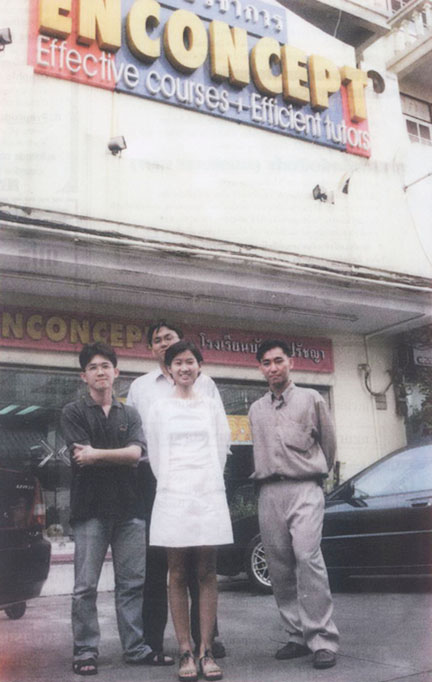
Enconcept Founder in front of the First Branch in 2000

Enconcept E-Academy was established in March, 1995 at Soi Watphaitan, Bangkok. The school opened for upper secondary school level tutorial in subjects such as English, French, Social Studies, Thai, and Mathematics. It began with seven students but grew to 400. Later, it focused on the English language led by Ms. Arisara Tanapakit or Kru P’Nan.

In 1999, the academy started to compose music for English teaching based on Edutainment principle. The first song composed was ‘Kong Keaw’ (Be concerned with) and another song is ‘Noom Seven’ (A 7/11 guy). The teaching practice accompanied by the songs became popular among students. As a result, the academy produced more songs by combining vocabulary, conversation, grammar, and word roots into the songs. The songs usually talk about teenager lives such as love and fashion using folk song, hip-hop, pop, and rock. The songs were named Memolody, coined by blending ‘memory’ and ‘melody’ together. Now Enconcept E-Academy has more than 260 memolodies, covering more than 3,000 English vocabularies.

The number of students enrolled increased from 400 to 2,000 within 2 years.

While most of tutorial schools use mimeograph or paper copying, Enconcept distributed textbooks by offset printing. The Academic Division and Creative Division are the ones accountable for the learning materials. Some of textbooks were printed with a special color to be accompanied with a color filter paper which is used for Stereogram to cover English vocabulary items. The academy has produced approximately 200 English learning textbooks. At the end of 2009, Enconcept E-Academy had 30 branches.

=== Second era (2000-2007) ===
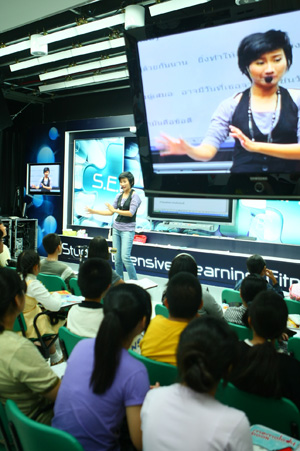
Enconcept in 2009

Enconcept E-Academy has provided live teaching and video recordings in a similar way to other tutorial schools. In 2003, the academy was the first tutorial school to employ the MPEG2 (Super VCD) recording which gave a better visual display and sound than the VHS system.

In 2004, the academy developed the class recording system with DVD and installed the Smart Board system to increase learning efficiency since digital file formats could be used as teaching materials. Enconcept E-Academy has also developed Student Call Center, Learning on demand, server set-up, registration system and payment system to support the branch expansion.

In 2006, Enconcept E-Academy expanded its branches to 19 provinces, together 26 branches. In the same year, E-Live system was introduced into the instruction to broadcast the teaching and academic events to all branches over the country. By this way, the students would have a chance to interact with the edutainers and other students in different branches such as asking questions via SMS, Call Center, Web site, and E-mail. Furthermore, Enconcept initiated the use of Boost Back-up, CD Multimedia for practicing listening and speaking English with native speakers in a small amount of time.

Enconcept E-Academy has 35 branches.

=== Third era (2008-present) ===
In 2008 the academy invested 25 million Baht to build educational technology "SELF" (Student Extensive Learning Fitness), which is multimedia for learning English outside the classroom. It has a translation of the article and reads the article out loud with different accents of English. SELF facilitates listening, speaking, reading, and writing skills.

My Coach is an online program that enables communication between teacher and learners. A proficiency measure helps students recognize their level compared to other groups. In 2009, the Ministry of Education issued a temporary shutdown order to the tutorial schools to avoid the spread of H1N1 influenza virus. However, Enconcept E-Academy lessened the impact because SELF was used from the student's home. The academy has opened the Integrated TOEFL iBT Online Course in which students learn with high quality in visual and audio from homes.

== List of Executives ==
- Mr. Tanate Ua-Apithorn
- Dr. Dhammasak Ua-Apithorn
- Ms. Arisara Tanapakit

=== Educational Technology ===
The school uses the SmartBoard and E-Studio system, which allows broadcasting all over the country.

=== E-Live ===
The E-Live System and WAN Link (Wide Area Network) is used to broadcast teaching and academic events to branches over the country through a fiber optic system. This gives the students immediate interaction with other students in different branches such as asking questions via SMS.

== In popular culture ==
- "Kru P’Nan Arisara Tanapakit more than a teacher" in Woody Talk, Channel 9 MCOT, on May 31, 2015
- "Kru P’Nan Arisara Tanapakit Talk show" in Tonight Show, Channel 3, on March 17, 2014
- "Kru P’Nan Arisara Tanapakit Sud Yod Diew Karn Sorn Pasa Angrit (Supreme Solo English Teaching)" in VIP TV program, Channel 9, on January 18, 2010
