= Bangpakok Wittayakom School =

Location
- Bangkok; Thailand
- Coordinates: 13.683042°N 100.495063°E

Information
- Other name: BPK
- Type: Public school
- Established: 1949
- Grades: 7-12
- Enrollment: 3,138 (2025 academic year)
- Colors: Pink and green
- School tree: Cassia fistula (Chaiyapeurk)
- Website: http://www.bpk.ac.th

"Bangpakok Wittayakom School" (Thai: โรงเรียนบางปะกอกวิทยาคม) is a public school located in Bangkok, Thailand. The school admits secondary students, grades 7 to 12, aged 11–18. The previous name of the school was Mattayom Wat Bangpakok School.

== History ==
Bangpakok Wittayakom school was initiated by Phra Kru Sassikkakij, an abbot of Wat Bangpakok. He wanted the ministry of education to open a school in Bangpakok district. So, he used the 2nd floor of disciplined building of the Wat Bangpakok for teaching in the beginning. Bangpakok Wittayakom School was open for grade 11 on 17 May 1949 for the first time.

Later, Lom Fuk-udom, Boonnakorn Mungkalee and Ta-nhom Iamtos bought land, gave it to Wat Bangpakok and transferred ownership to the Department of General Education. Then on 3 January 1951, the school was moved to a new school building on the 9600 m^{2} land. In 1964, Lom Fuk-udom donated an additional land 4,048 m^{2} to the school. Now, Bangpakok Wittayakom school has an area of approximately 12,000 m^{2}. In 1974, Bangpakok Wittayakom school was approved to open for high school curriculum.

The school won the ASEAN quiz, organised by the Thai Ministry of Foreign Affairs to commemorate ASEAN’s 41st Anniversary, on 8 August 2008.

== Curriculum ==
The major programs in Lower Secondary level include:

- Normal Program (6 Classes)
- Science-Power-Ten Program (1 Class)
- Talent Enrichment Program; TEP (6 Classes)
- English Program; EP (1 Class)

The major programs in Upper Secondary level include:

- Talent Enrichment Program; TEP (4 Classes)
- Science - Mathematics (4 Classes)
- Science - Mathematics; Science-Power-Ten (1 Class)
- English - Mathematics (2 Classes)
- English - Chinese, French and Japanese (1 Class)
- Politics - Law (1 Class)
- English Program; EP (1 Class)
