= Wat Putthabucha School =

- โรงเรียนวัดพุทธบูชา

Location
- Bangkok; Thailand
- Coordinates: 13.650980°N 100.475063°E

Information
- Type: Public secondary school
- Established: 1973
- Grades: 7–12
- Enrollment: 2,000 (2009 academic year)
- Color: Red-Yellow
- Nickname: WPB
- School tree: Putthabucha
- Website: http://www.wpb.ac.th

Wat Putthabucha School (Thai: โรงเรียนวัดพุทธบูชา) is a public school located in Bangkok, Thailand. The school admits secondary students, grades 7 to 12, aged 11–18. The previous name of this school is 'Putthabucha Wittayakom'.

== Curriculum ==
The major programmes at Upper Secondary level include:

- Science-Mathematics (including Physics, Chemistry and Biology) - Mathematics (3 Classes)
- English-Mathematics (2 Classes)
- English-Chinese (1 Classes)
- Social Sciences-Thai (1 Classes)
