= Prakanongpittayalai School =

High school in Bangkok, Thailand

Coordinates: 13°41′43.17″N 100°35′30.23″E

Information
- Established: 1958; 68 years ago

Prakanongpittayalai School is a high school in Bangkok, Thailand. The school is near Bangchak Petroleum Public Company Limited (BCP) and Khlong Toei Port. In the grade 7-12, the school has many field of study. Such as Sciences, Mathematics, Arts, English, Japanese, Chinese and Korean.

== History ==
The school was founded in 1958. In the past, the school received children around community of the school for study in junior level only. But in the 1964, the school opened for senior level in the field of arts and opened the field of sciences in 1966.

The school has many field of study in the grade 10-12 such as Sciences, Mathematics, Arts, English, Japanese, Chinese and Korean. Besides, sometimes the school led the student to learn about science content and work in Bangchak Petroleum Public Company Limited (BCP) because that company is near the school.

== See also ==
- Khlong Toei Port
