= List of universities in Bangkok =

This is a list of colleges and universities in Bangkok, Thailand.

== Public ==
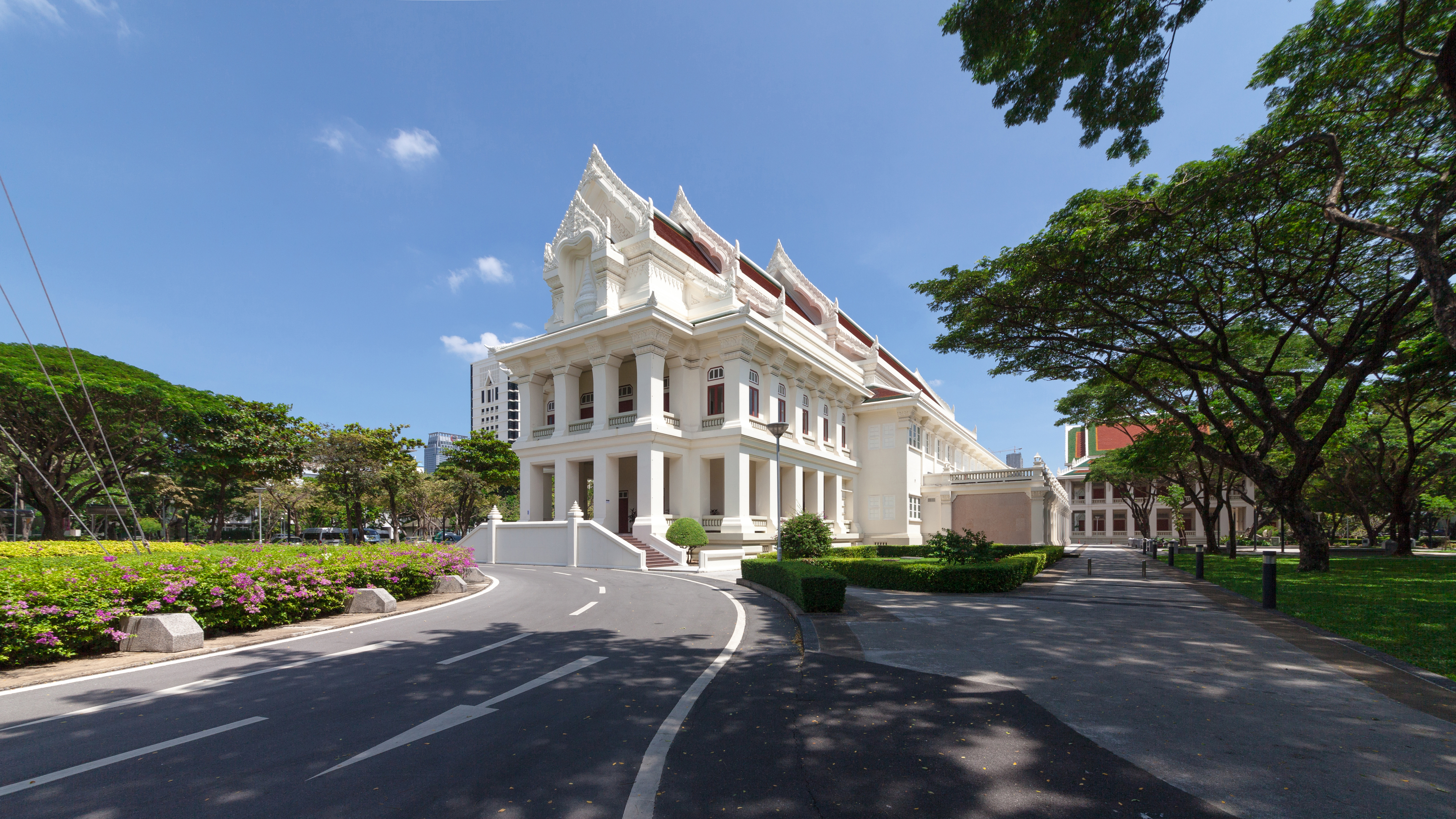
Chulalongkorn University Auditorium

- University of Bangkok Metropolis
- Chulalongkorn University
- Kasetsart University (Bangkhen Campus)
- King Mongkut's Institute of Technology Ladkrabang
- King Mongkut's University of Technology North Bangkok
- King Mongkut's University of Technology Thonburi
- Mahachulalongkornrajavidyalaya University
- Mahamakut Buddhist University
- Mahidol University (Phyathai Campus)
- National Institute of Development Administration
- Rajamangala University of Technology
  - Rajamangala University of Technology Krung Thep
    - Bangkok Technical Campus
    - Bophit Phimuk Mahamek Campus
    - Krung Thep Phra Nakhon Tai Campus
  - Rajamangala University of Technology Rattanakosin
    - Bophit Phimuk Chakkrawat Campus
    - Pohchang Campus
  - Rajamangala University of Technology Phra Nakhon
    - Thewet Campus
    - Chotiwet Campus
    - Bangkok Commerce Campus
    - Chumphonkhet Udomsak Campus
    - North Bangkok Campus
  - Rajamangala University of Technology Tawan-ok
    - Chakrabongse Bhuvanarth Campus
    - Uthenthawai Campus
- Ramkhamhaeng University
- Silpakorn University (Wang Tha Phra Campus)
- Srinakharinwirot University
- Thammasat University (Tha Phrachan Campus)

== Private ==
- Assumption University
- Bangkok University (City Campus)
- Dhurakijpundit University
- Dusit Thani College
- Kasem Bundit University
- Mahanakorn University of Technology
- North Bangkok University
- Rangsit University
- Ratana Bundit University
- RIC-Regents International College
- SAE Institute Bangkok
- Saint John's University
- Siam University
- Sripathum University
- Stamford International University
- Thongsook College
- University of the Thai Chamber of Commerce
- Webster University
- Krirk University

== See also ==
- List of schools in Bangkok
- List of universities and colleges in Thailand
