= Sarasas Witaed Suksa School =

Private school in Thailand

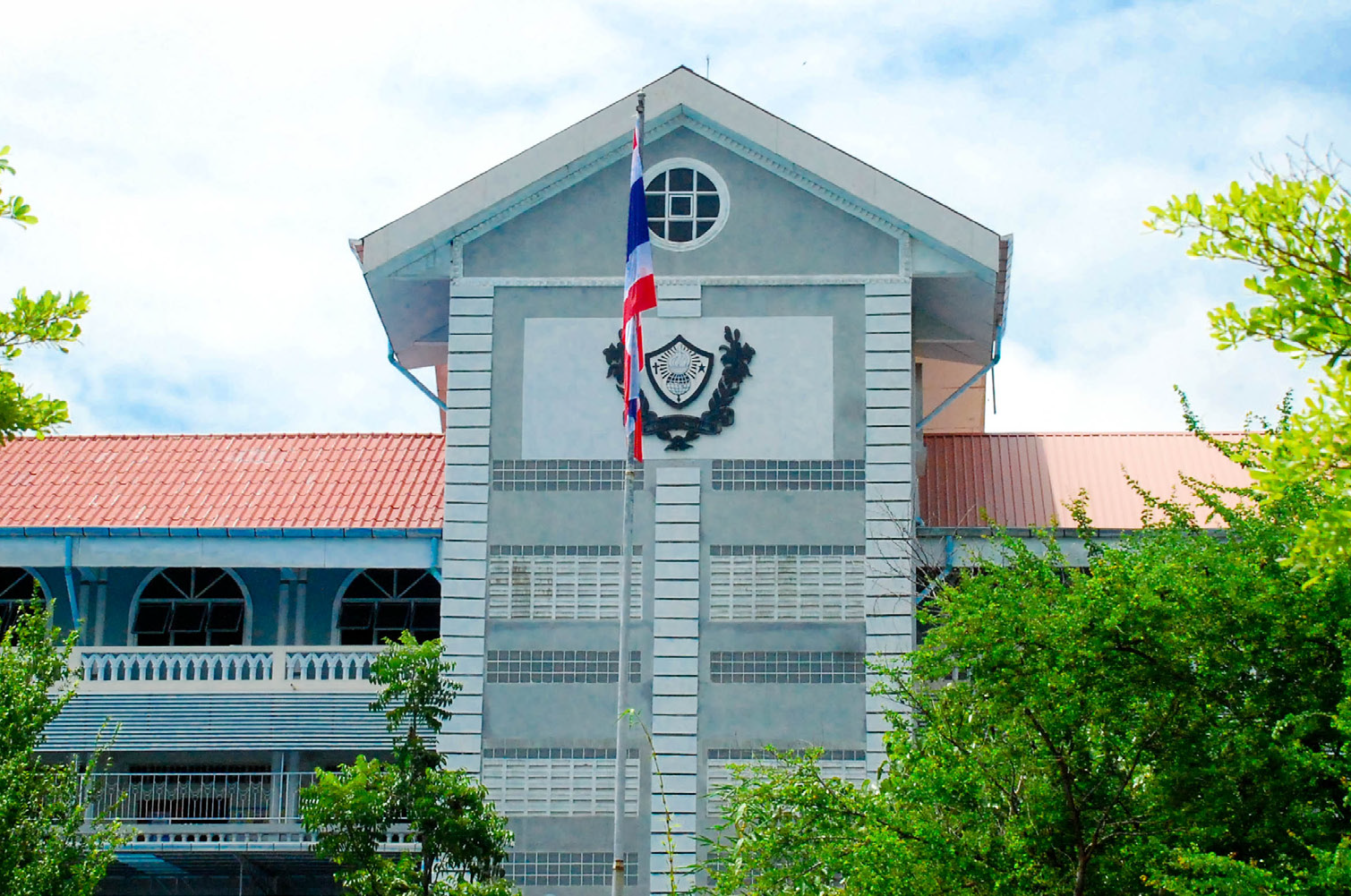
Building 1

Sarasas Witaed Suksa School (Thai: โรงเรียนสารสาสน์วิเทศศึกษา) is a private school in Thailand. It is the 12th school in the Sarasas-affiliated school group. It was founded by Mr. Piboon and Mrs. Pen Sri Yongkamol. It was initially built on an area of 5 rai 48 square wa. Construction began in October 1996 and was completed in May 1997. At first, it was just a 72-meter-long school building, then 6 floors were added in 1999. The area was extended to 8 rai 378 square wah for the construction of a Swimming pool. Indoor parking, a canteen and the second school building were built later in 2006. The school has expanded the area in front of the first building as a pond to construct: the third building, a football field and an outdoor car park, to meet the growing number of students and staff. Currently, the school has a total area of 13 rai 1 ngan 26 square meters

Sarasas Witaed Suksa School is the third of Sarasas affiliated schools that offers a Bilingual Program (bilingual instruction plan). The program includes subjects such as English, mathematics, life experience, Music and computing. Using teaching materials in English and also recruiting foreign teachers based on the curriculum of the Ministry of Education (which focuses on children as the center of learning), coupled with Thai, the program currently offers courses in international educational program, or IEP, for Kindergarten 3 and grades 1–6 to expand students' capabilities.

== School history ==
Since 1996, Sarasas Witaed Suksa School has been conducting an experiment in teaching a bilingual department in Sarasas Prachauthitpittayakhan School from Kindergarten 3 to grade 2. 3 classrooms with 90 students at Sarasas Witaed School were built, allowing new students to join the school. In 1997, the school had 469 students (from Kindergarten to Grade 5) in the bilingual department and 360 people in the general department, totaling 2 departments, 829 people, with 35 Thai teachers, and 12 foreign teachers.

== School building ==
Building 1, built in 1997, is a 6-storey concrete building, currently used for grades 1 to 5 teaching and learning, computer room, classroom keyboard, drum set classroom, Thai music classroom, guitar classroom, screening room, laboratory, library, the director's and management's room, the hospital room, the cafeteria, and a meeting hall on the sixth floor

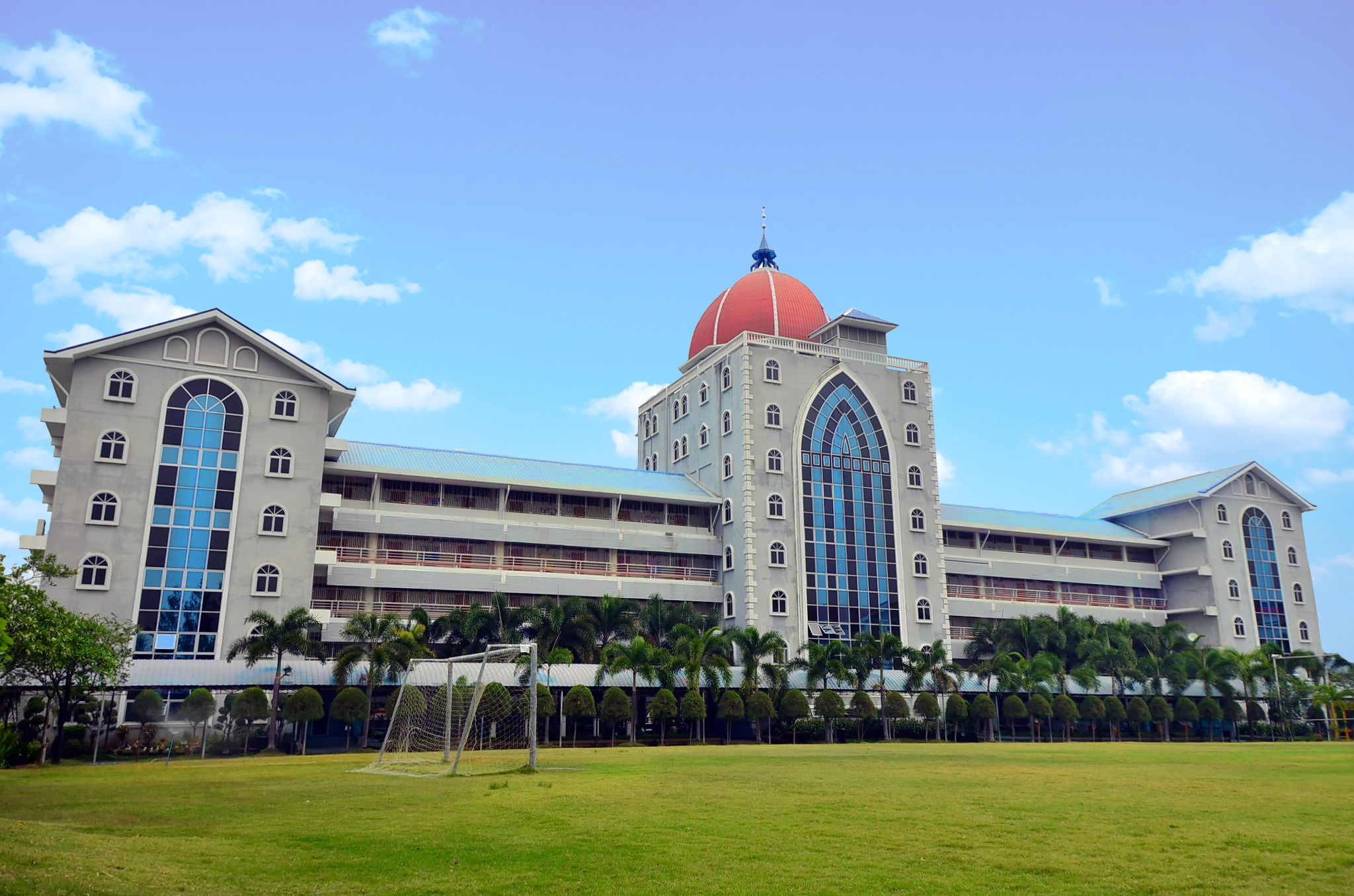
Building 3

Building 2, completed in 2000, is a 5-storey concrete building, currently used for Kindergarten grades 1–3 teaching and learning. Some halls, dining rooms, teachers' rooms, laboratories and cooking rooms. On the fifth floor, is a large meeting room spanning the length of the whole school building, used for storing things and organizing various activities.

== Principals ==
Rating	List	The term of office
1	Piboon Yongkamol	2540
2	Jaroon Katiyasarn	2540–2542
3	Suwanit Yongkamol	1999 – 2008 (went to be the Director of Sarasas District 3 Khor)
4	Sasitorn Hongschuwech	2008 (Served as Principal)
5	Srikuraporn Sub-Anekyot	2009 (Served as Principal)
6	Warisanan Dejpanprasong	2010–present (served as Director)
