= Darunsikkhalai School for Innovative Learning =

Coordinates: 13.649972°N 100.494996°E

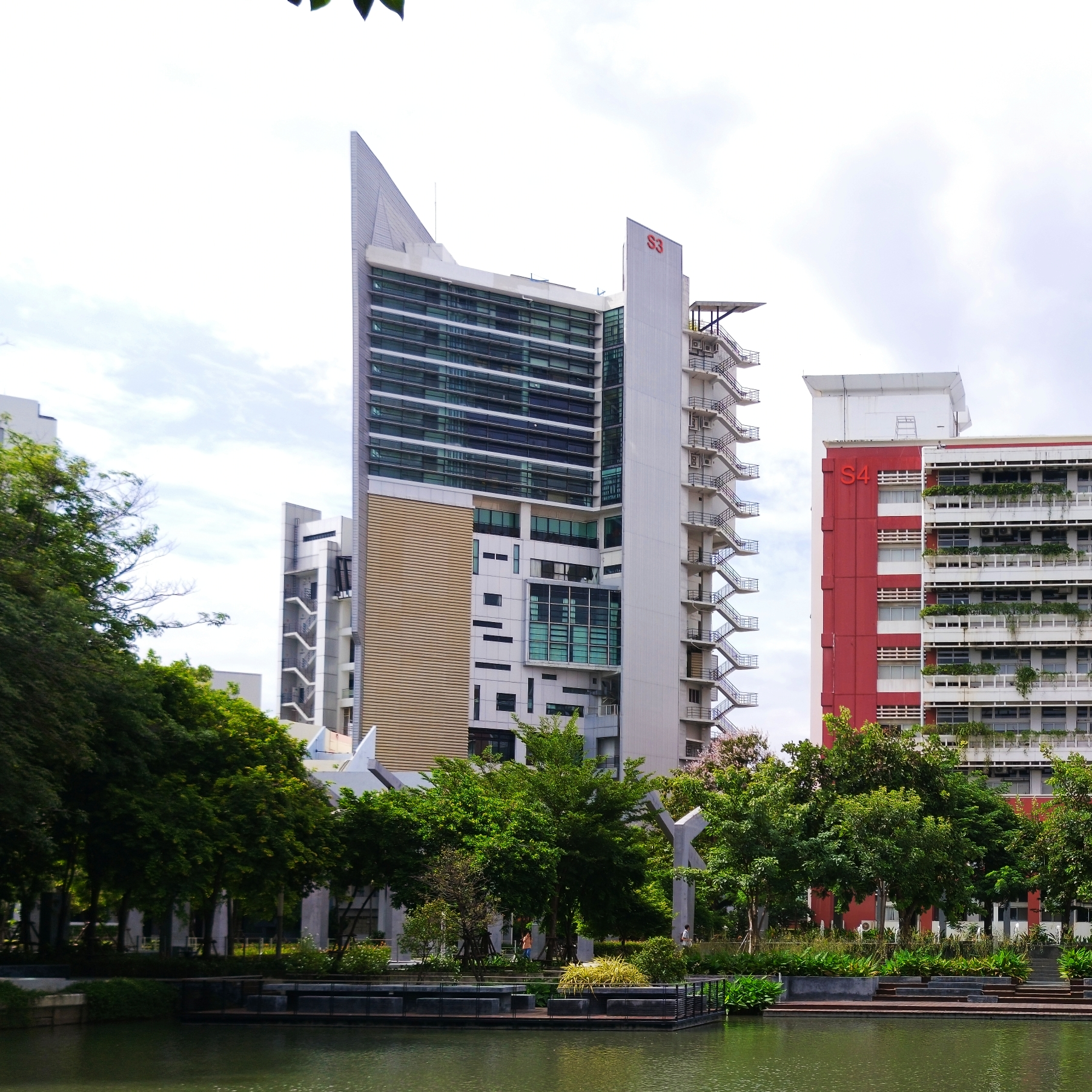
Building of Darunsikkhalai School for Innovative Learning (center)

Darunsikkhalai School for Innovative Learning (Thai: ดรุณสิกขาลัย โรงเรียนนวัตกรรมแห่งการเรียนรู้) (also, "DSIL", "Darun") is a bilingual school located in King Mongkut's University of Technology Thonburi. DSIL is Thailand’s first school that follows the Constructionism Theory as the school curriculum. DSIL was founded in 1997 and has a variety of connections to educational institutions, such as Stanford University, Massachusetts Institute of Technology (MIT), etc. to keep the school innovative and moving forward.

== History ==
Darunsikkhalai School for Innovative Learning was founded by Mr. Paron Isarasena Na- Ayuthaya in 1997 he was the director of the Lighthouse Project (Education development project in Thailand created by the Suksaphat Foundation). and a member of King Mongkut's University of Technology Thonburi Board of Committee. He brought the concept of Constructionism from Professor Seymour Papert of Massachusetts Institute of Technology (MIT) The developer of Constructionism Theory into Darunsikkhalai school curriculum. The actual curriculum used currently were developed from both the Constructionism and Constructivism theories of Seymour Papert and Jean Piaget. Both theories introduce learners to cognitive and learning sciences combined with physiology and used in the school for basic learning.

== Constructionism in school ==
It started on the project called “Epistemological theory of constructivism” of Jean Piaget. When Seymour Papert was corroborating with Jean on his project. The theory is that individual learners construct mental models to understand the world around them. Seymour gave definition of Constructionism on titled Constructionism: A New Opportunity for Elementary Science Education that "The word constructionism is a mnemonic for two aspects of the theory of science education underlying this project. From constructivist theories of psychology we take a view of learning as a reconstruction rather than as a transmission of knowledge. Then we extend the idea of manipulative materials to the idea that learning is most effective when part of an activity the learner experiences as constructing is a meaningful product.” . In this way of learning learner will learn from real life objects which learners can study the topic by both using technology or not using the technology. They can learn project from creating multimedia presentation such as writing a book, creating invention or even drawing art work, etc. In this way it helps student to find themselves that which way of doing things and present it will best suitable for them. Inside Constructionism Theory separated into two important subjects which are 1.Project-based learning and 2.Problem-based learning.

=== Project-based learning ===
Project-based learning which allows students to think of a project that they’re interested in then make research and summary it into a report and present them to audiences. In this way it helps student to think creatively and know the process of creating something. In overall Constructionism Theory, allow learners to learn more deeper and learn how to be a better learner.

=== Problem-based learning ===
Problem-based learning allow learners to utilize the problem as question that they suffer to solve and think that which solution is the most efficient solution for that problem. In this process it makes student learn how to solve a problem so in the future they will have a head fills with ways to solve any complicated questions.

== Levels in school ==
Darunsikkhalai School separates levels of students by their capability, not their ages, because it is believed that students cannot be judged by their ages, but they should be judged by their knowledge and the level of development of their brain each levels has different of requirements so higher will have more requirements, and details of work have to be more advanced. Three levels are:

=== New Learner ===
New Learner – new students are required to be in this level because they need to learn all of the basis of constructionism theory that applied in school curriculum.

== FabLab @ School, Bangkok ==
Recently Darunsikkhalai school has brought FabLab@School from Stanford University Department of Transformative Learning Technologies Lab (Originally created by MIT and brought to Stanford University by MIT Graduated students) which is a digital fabrication laboratory that is equipped with tools such as 3D printers, 3D scanners, Laser cutters, Vinyl cutters and more, which will help students develop their projects. Students have the opportunity to collaborate with Professor Paulo Blikstein from Stanford University as well as Professor Arnan Sipitakiat from Chiangmai University, both of whom assist the students to help them create new methods of learning.
