= Secondary Demonstration School of Bansomdejchaopraya Rajabhat University =

Coordinates: 13.731903°N 100.488692°E

Secondary Demonstration School of Bansomdejchaopraya Rajabhat University Thai: โรงเรียนมัธยมสาธิตมหาวิยาลัยราชภัฏบ้านสมเด็จเจ้าพระยา

Information
- Established: 17 May 1914; 111 years ago
- Affiliation: Bansomdejchaopraya Rajabhat University

The Secondary Demonstration School of Bansomdejchaopraya Rajabhat University (Thai: โรงเรียนมัธยมสาธิตมหาวิยาลัยราชภัฏบ้านสมเด็จเจ้าพระยา, romanized: roong rian mát yom sǎa tí dtom hǎa wí yaa lai râat pát bâan sǒm dèt jâo prá yaa, abbreviated B.S. or บ.ส.) is a school in Bangkok, Thailand. It is affiliated with Bansomdejchaopraya Rajabhat University in Bangkok.

The school was founded in 1914 by the East Teacher Training School (Chaopraya Pasakorn) on the recommendation of King Rama V. It is home to a preschool, pre-primary school, primary school, and secondary school.

== Description ==
The secondary school, referred to as Satit Bansomdej, aims to prepare students for university-level work by providing them with the responsibility to manage their study schedule independently. Exam questions at Satit Bansomdej are often based on university tests, which follow the teaching principle “Difficult tests make students try harder.”

Students manage their activities independently with little assistance from their teachers. One of the most popular activities students undertake is the Satit Rajabhat Sumpan Games. These include a series of competitions in many different sports, as well as cheerleading and parades for other schools affiliated with the Rajabhat University system. At least nine demonstration schools of Rajabhat University join the games, with the cheerleading competition considered the highlight of the event.

Instructions at Satit Bansomdej are designed to develop students' social skills as well as work skills. The majors include: Pure Science, Maths-Art, and Science-Math.

== History ==
The Secondary Demonstration School was established on 17 May 1914. Pramuan Vichapoon served as a principal, and Khunjam Vichasorn served as Assistant Principal. Students included boarders and commuters.

In 1986, the school was divided into primary and secondary schools. In 1988, a parents club was formed. In 1991, The school was selected by the Ministry of Education to receive the best small school award of the year in 1990. Its name was changed to The Secondary Demonstration School of Bansomdejchao praya Rajabhat University by The Rajabhat Institutes Act.

== Symbol of the school ==
- Purple/White: Purple refers to stability and the collaborative effort undertaken to develop the institute. The colour white refers to a pure heart, fairness, and honesty.
- School's slogan: สจจ เว อมตา วาจา refers to truth as fact, which is a stubborn thing.
