= Assumption Convent School (Thailand) =

Private Catholic school for girls in Bangkok

Coordinates: 13.72285°N 100.51435°E

Assumption Convent School (ASC, French: Couvent De l'Assomption, Thai: โรงเรียนอัสสัมชัญคอนแวนต์) is a private girls' school in Thailand founded in 1904 by the Roman Catholic Mission of Siam and has since been managed by the Sisters of St. Paul of Chartres. The school is located in the vicinity of the Assumption Cathedral in Bang Rak District, Bangkok. The colours of the school are Red and White.

== History ==
Rising anti-clericalism in France during the Third Republic, culminating in 1905 French law on the Separation of the Churches and the State, increased pressure on the mission to accelerate their effort overseas. The Apostolic Vicar of Eastern Siam, Bishop Jean-Louis Vey, M.E.P., proposed to set up a school for girls to learn how to sew and how to speak English, German, Portuguese, and French. Thus, Assumption Convent School was founded on 2 March 1904, and had Soeur Saint Xavier as its first superior.

There were 37 children, 7 superiors and sisters, and a few secular teachers at the beginning. They used and were taught English, Portuguese, German, and Thai. The school also taught music.

Assumption Convent School is located at Charoen Krung 40 Alley, Charoen Krung Road, Bang Rak District, Bangkok, Thailand. The allocated area of 3 rai 2 ngan is about 5,600 square metres (60,000 sq ft) on the bank of the Chao Phraya River in the area of Assumption Cathedral. On 18 June 1905, the first building of the school was opened. So, this day was considered to be the official opening day.

In 1952, the Superior decided to build another school called Assumption Suksa School that is under the responsibility of Assumption Cathedral.

In 1995, a new school called Assumption Convent Silom School opened to students in grades 1–6. Assumption Convent Silom School is located at 8 Pramuan Road, Silom Sub-District.

== Architecture ==
The Study Hall, one of the school's original buildings, is a listed historic building that received the ASA Architectural Conservation Award in 2007. It is a three-storey building in Colonial style, with arched windows and a front portico demonstrating Classical influence.
