= Sebastian Francis =

Malaysian cardinal and bishop

His Eminence Cardinal Dato' Seri Sebastian Francis DGPN DSPN
- Cardinal, Bishop of Penang
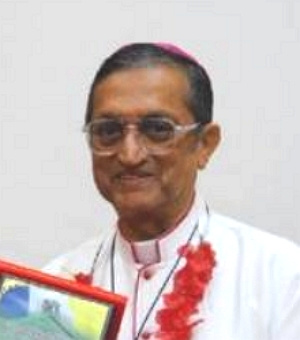
- Church: Catholic Church
- Diocese: Penang
- Appointed: 7 July 2011
- Installed: 19 August 2011
- Predecessor: Antony Selvanayagam
- Other post: Cardinal Priest of Santa Maria Causa Nostrae Laetitiae (2023‍–‍present)
- Previous posts: President of the Catholic Bishops' Conference of Malaysia, Singapore and Brunei (2016‍–‍2023); Vicar General of the Diocese of Malacca–Johor (1999‍–‍2001, 2003‍–‍2011)

Orders
- Ordination: 28 July 1977
- Consecration: 19 August 2011 by Murphy Pakiam
- Created cardinal: 30 September 2023 by Francis
- Rank: Cardinal priest

Personal details
- Born: 11 November 1951 (age 74) Johor Bahru, Johor, Federation of Malaya
- Education: College General; Pontifical University of Saint Thomas Aquinas; Maryknoll School of Theology
- Motto: Fiat voluntas tua (Latin for 'Thy will be done')
- Coat of arms

Styles of Sebastian Francis
- Reference style: His Eminence
- Spoken style: Your Eminence
- Religious style: Cardinal
- Informal style: Cardinal

Cardinal Dato' Seri Sebastian Francis (born 11 November 1951) is a Malaysian Catholic prelate who has served as Bishop of Penang since 2011. Pope Francis elevated him to the rank of cardinal in 2023. He is the second cardinal from Malaysia, after Anthony Soter Fernandez.

== Early life and education ==
Sebastian Francis was born on 11 November 1951, in Johor Bahru, which was then part of the Federation of Malaya. His grandparents had emigrated from India's Thrissur district (formerly known as Trichur) in Kerala to Malaysia in the 1890s during British rule. His family belonged to the Mechery family of Ollur in Thrissur. Francis grew up in Malaysia, where his family included five brothers and four sisters, all of whom became Malaysian citizens.

From 1958 to 1963, Francis received his primary education at St. Joseph's Primary School in Johor Bahru, which was run by the Brothers of St. Gabriel. From 1964 to 1967, he attended Montfort Secondary School in Singapore, also managed by the Brothers of St. Gabriel, where he completed his secondary education up to the Senior Cambridge level. Between 1964 and 1966, Francis joined the Juniorate of the Brothers of St. Gabriel in Singapore and lived in community with the Brothers. In 1967, he successfully passed the Senior Cambridge examination in Singapore.

== Priesthood ==
Francis entered Saint Francis Xavier Minor Seminary in Singapore in 1967 and enrolled in the College General, a major seminary in Penang, three years later, where he studied theology. At the age of 26, he was ordained a priest for the Diocese of Melaka-Johor on 28 July 1977.

He was parish vicar of St. Francis Xavier in Malacca from 1977 to 1981 and then briefly parish vicar of Immaculate Conception in Johor Bahru. He then moved to Rome and earned a licentiate in dogmatic theology from the Pontifical University of Saint Thomas Aquinas in 1983. He was parish vicar of St. Francis Xavier in Malacca in 1984; professor of dogmatic theology and spiritual director at the major seminary of Penang, chaplain of university students in Penang, administrator of the Church of the Immaculate Conception in Paulau Tikus-Penang and pastoral coordinator from 1985 to 1988; vicar general of Malacca-Johor from 1988 to 2001; pastor of the Cathedral in Malacca from 1988 to 2004; diocesan administrator of Malacca-Johor in 2002-2003; parish priest of St. Louis in Kluang from 2004 to 2007; parish priest of the Immaculate Conception from 2007 to 2011; and pastor of Christ the King in Kulai in 2011–2012. He was vicar general of Malacca-Johor from 2003 to 2012. He interrupted his pastoral work to study at the Maryknoll School of Theology in New York where he obtained a degree in justice and peace studies in 1991.

== Bishop of Penang ==
On 7 July 2012, Benedict XVI appointed Francis the fifth bishop of the Diocese of Penang. He received his episcopal consecration on 20 August 2012 at St Anne’s Church in Bukit Mertajam from Archbishop Murphy Nicholas Xavier Pakiam, with Bishops Antony Selvanayagam and Paul Tan Chee Ing serving as co-consecrators. His consecration was witnessed by 10,000 Catholics and attended by then Chief Minister of Penang, Lim Guan Eng.

On 9 July 2023, Pope Francis announced he planned to make Sebastian a cardinal at a consistory scheduled for 30 September. At that consistory, Pope Francis made him a cardinal priest, assigning him the title of Santa Maria Causa Nostrae Laetitiae. He participated as a cardinal elector in the 2025 papal conclave that elected Pope Leo XIV.

He is the chairman of the Office of Social Communication (OSC) of the Federation of Asian Bishops' Conferences (FABC) since 2023. He was formerly the president of the Catholic Bishops' Conference of Malaysia, Singapore and Brunei from 2016 to 2023. Francis is the Grand Prior of the Malaysia-Penang Lieutenancy of the Equestrian Order of the Holy Sepulchre of Jerusalem.

== Personal life ==
Francis is multilingual, with proficiency in English, Malay and Tamil. His personal interests include reading, traveling and participating in outdoor activities such as hiking, hill climbing and brisk walking.

== Honours ==
=== Honours of Malaysia ===
- Penang
  - Officer of the Order of the Defender of State (DSPN) – Dato' (2016)
  - Commander of the Order of the Defender of State (DGPN) – Dato' Seri (2021)

== See also ==
- Cardinals created by Francis

Catholic Church titles
Preceded by Antony Selvanayagam	Bishop of Penang; 2011-current	Succeeded by Incumbent
