= College General =

Roman Catholic seminary in Malaysia

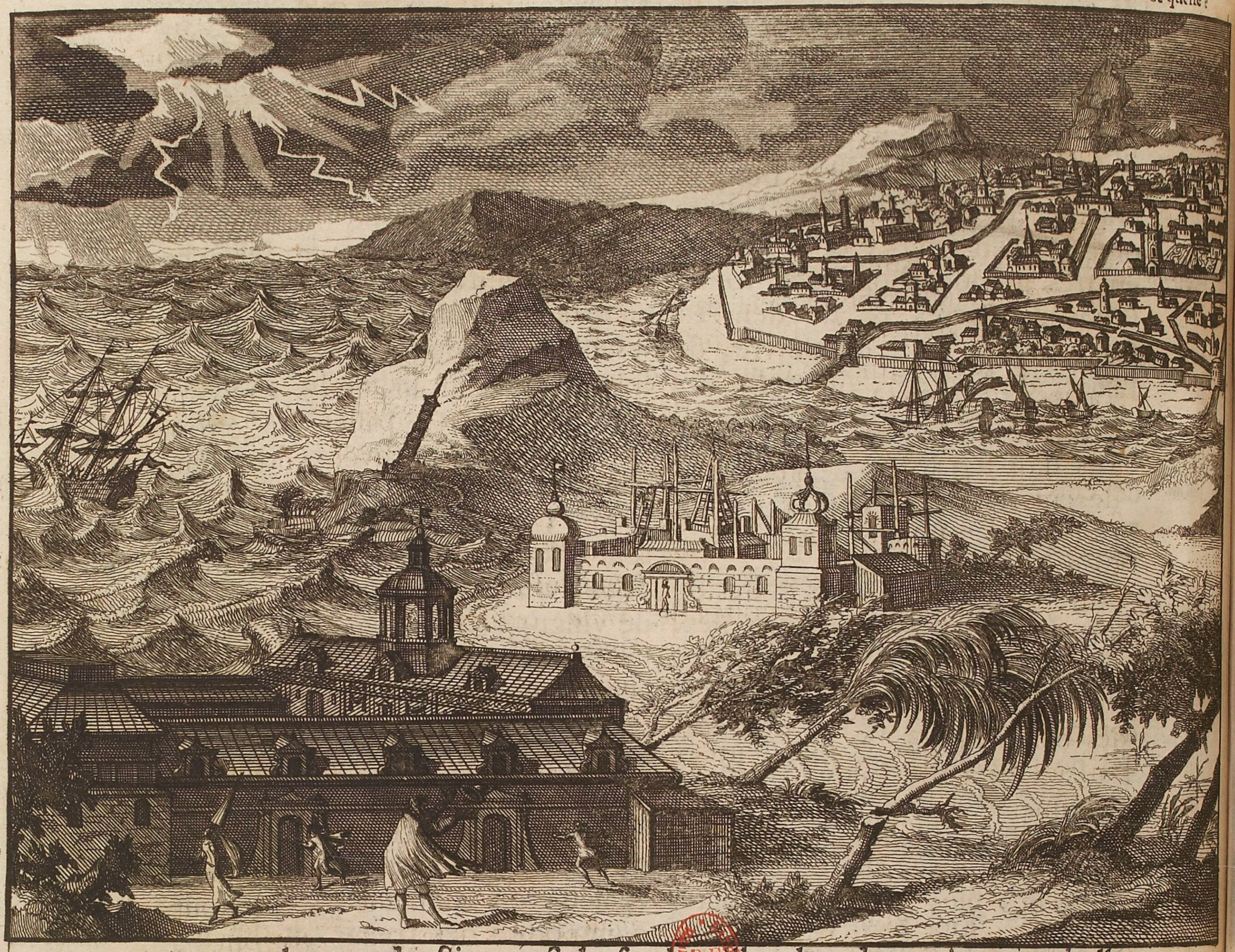
Foundation of the Seminary of Saint Joseph in Ayutthaya, Siam, in 1665.

The College General (Malay: Seminari Tinggi Katolik) is a Catholic interdiocesan seminary located at Tanjong Bungah in George Town, Penang, Malaysia. The college's foundation can be traced back to the 1665 establishment of the Seminary of Saint Joseph in Ayuthia which was then the capital of Siam (now Thailand).

== History ==
=== Ayuthia (1665–1765) ===
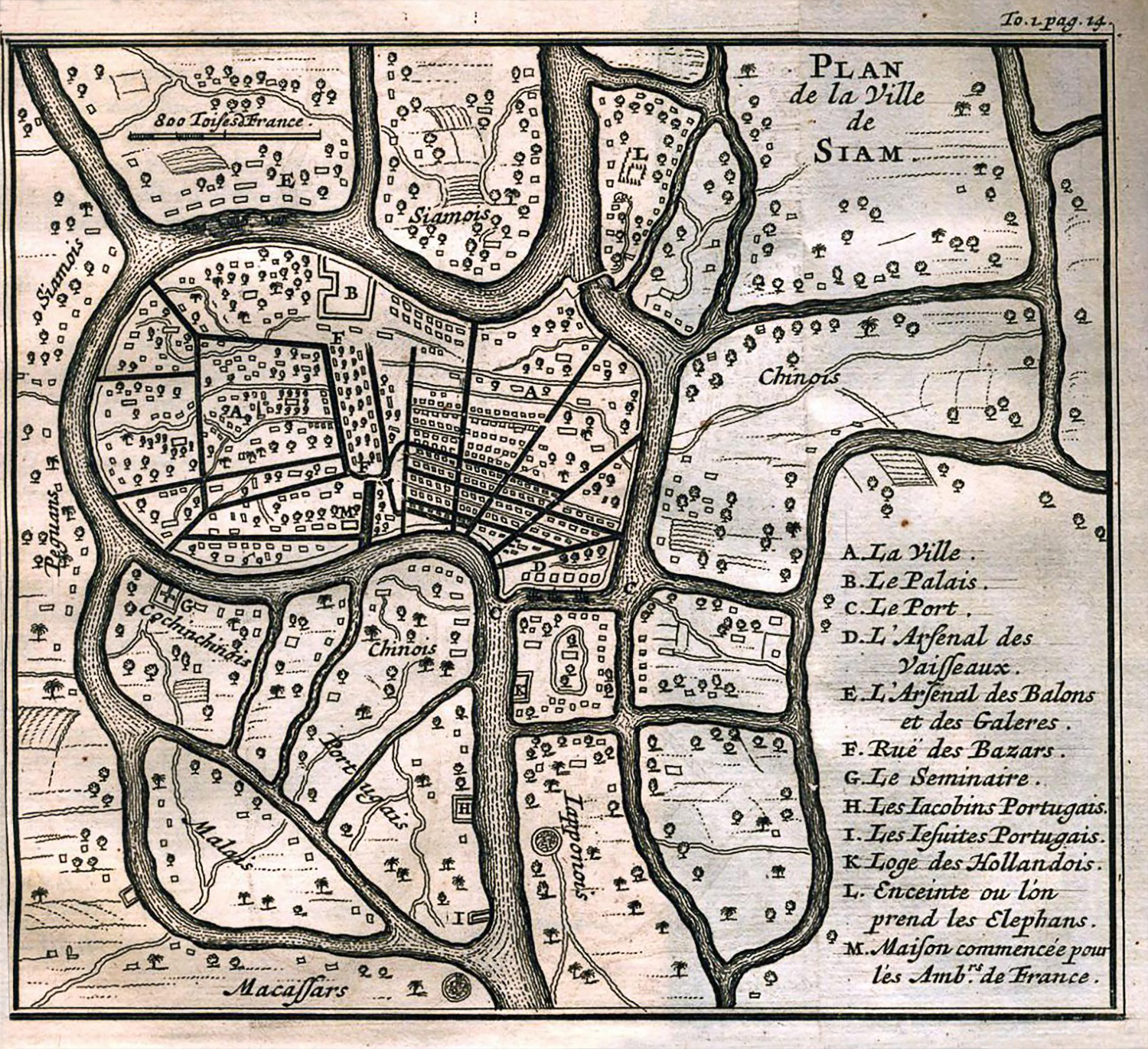
The Seminary (letter "G") was located in the western part of Ayutthaya, in the Cochinchinese quarter.

The College General traces its history to the establishment of the Seminary of Saint Joseph in Ayuthia, Siam, in 1665 by the Vicars Apostolic Bishops Pallu and Lambert de la Motte of the Paris Foreign Missions Society. They officially requested the establishment of the seminary to the Siamese king Narai on 25 May 1665, who granted them a large spot on the river Menam, and the Cochinchinese quarter named "Banplahet". King Narai requested that ten Siamese students be incorporated in the seminary so as to learn European knowledge. Otherwise, the students of the seminary came from Goa, Macao, Cochinchina, Tonkin and China. In 1675, Mgr Louis Laneau, who had been nominated Vicar Apostolic of Siam two years before, became Superior of the Seminary.

Among the first two priests that graduated was François Pérez (Francis Perez), born of a Manila father and a Siamese mother, who was later consecrated a bishop and named Vicar Apostolic of Cochin-China in 1691.

In 1680, the seminary was moved to a larger location in Mahapram, also near Ayutthaya, and was named Seminary of the Holy Angels.

The events of the Siamese revolution in 1688 saw the ousting of French forces from Siam, and the imprisonment of Louis Laneau and half of the students of the Seminary until August 1690, but the activities of the Seminary could resume from 1691.

=== Chanthaburi, Hon Dat, Pondicherry & Melaka (1765–1782) ===
The Burmese invasion of Ayuthia in 1765 forced the relocation of the seminary to Chanthaburi and later to Hon Dat in Cambodia (now in Vietnam). Pigneau de Behaine, who was to have a great destiny in Vietnam, was put in charge of the seminary.

The political instability of that period resulted in the seminarians to live in poverty and although a new building was built, it was razed to the ground by rebels. The deteriorating political situation and constant persecutions forced the search for a more tranquil location for the seminary.

India was chosen and in 1770, 2 professors and 41 seminarians arrived at Pondicherry, India, by sea after stopping for two months in Melaka. The seminary was established at Virampatnam.

Despite its peaceful calm, Pondicherry proved unsuitable as it was too far from China and Indo-China where most of the seminarians came from. As a result, the seminary was temporary closed in 1782 until a more suitable place could be found.

=== Pulau Tikus, Penang (1808–1914) ===
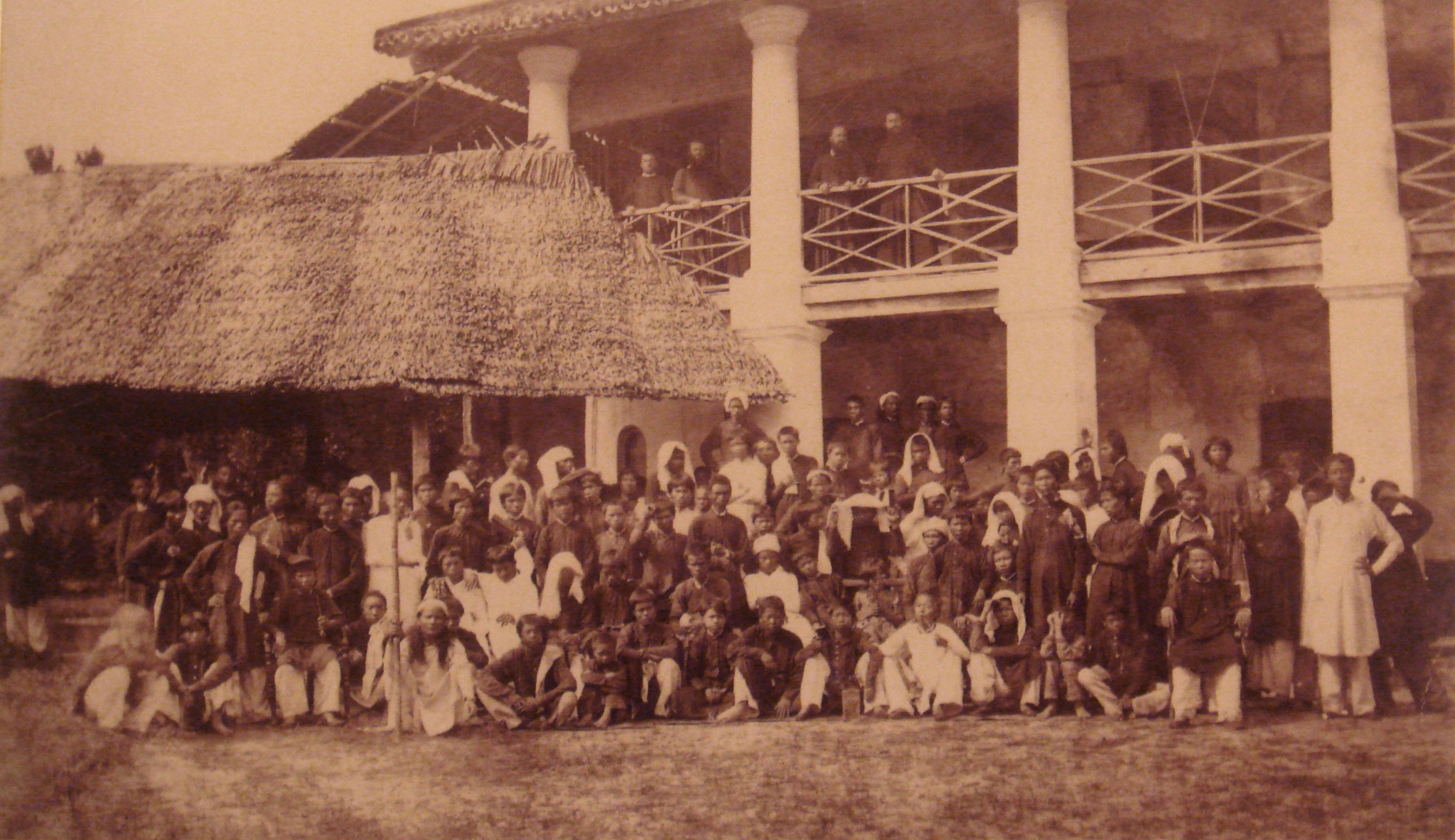
College General in Penang, 1866.

The island of Penang, a British colony since its occupation by Francis Light in 1786 was eventually chosen due to its political stability and geographical proximity to the other mission lands. In 1808, a new Superior, Fr. Lolivier arrived with five seminarians from Macau and the seminary was revived with its current name the following year in Pulau Tikus, Penang, with 20 seminarians from China. The college had prominent members take on the role as teaching staff, including Laurent-Marie-Joseph Imbert and Jacques-Honoré Chastan, who served from 1821 to 1822 and 1827 to 1830, respectively. Both were martyred in Korea and later beatified in 1925 by Pope Pius XI. Both were canonised in 1984 by Pope John Paul II. The college also was a sanctuary for the vicar general of Annam and scores of seminarians during the persecutions of 1834–35 and among the number included Philip Minh Van Doan who was martyred and later canonised in 1988.

In 1885, the buildings were expanded to cope with the additional seminarians that came to Penang due to persecution in other territories in the region. With peace returning, enrollment was reduced with a large majority of the seminarians coming from the newly established missions in Rangoon and Mandalay in Burma.

=== Pulau Tikus, Penang (1914–present) ===
At present, the College General is owned and managed by three dioceses: the Roman Catholic Archdiocese of Kuala Lumpur, Roman Catholic Diocese of Penang, and Roman Catholic Diocese of Malacca-Johor.

== People ==
=== Rectors of the College General ===
This is a list of rectors who have served the College General since it was revived in Penang in 1808.

Name	Affiliation	Year
Michael Lolivier, M.E.P.	Missions Étrangères de Paris	1808–1833
Francois Albrand, M.E.P.	Missions Étrangères de Paris	1833–1839
Claude Tisserand, M.E.P.	Missions Étrangères de Paris	1839–1848
Auguste Thivet, M.E.P.	Missions Étrangères de Paris	1848–1849
Victor Martin, M.E.P.	Missions Étrangères de Paris	1849–1868
Joseph Laigre, M.E.P.	Missions Étrangères de Paris	1868–1885
Edouard Wallays, M.E.P.	Missions Étrangères de Paris	1886–1917
Justin Pages, M.E.P.	Missions Étrangères de Paris	1917–1931
Marcel Rouhan, M.E.P.	Missions Étrangères de Paris	1931–1951
Rene Jean Davias, M.E.P.	Missions Étrangères de Paris	1951–1960
Francois M. Ledu, M.E.P.	Missions Étrangères de Paris	1960–1966
Jean-Marie Bosc, M.E.P.	Missions Étrangères de Paris	1966–1971
Achilles Choong	—	1971–1975
Anthony Soter Fernandez	Diocesan	1975–1977
Murphy Nicholas Xavier Pakiam	Diocesan	1978–1988
James Gnanapiragasam	Diocesan	1988–1994
Francis Anthony	Diocesan	1994–2005
Edwin Paul	Diocesan	2005–2010
Gerard Theraviam	Diocesan	2010–2017
Stanley Antoni	Diocesan	2017–present

=== Saints ===
Many of the college faculty and alumni were martyred over the years and some have eventually been canonised:

Name	Martyred	Place	Beatified	Canonised
Laurent-Marie-Joseph Imbert / St. Imbert	1839	Korea	1925	1984
Jacques-Honoré Chastan / St. Chastan	1839	Korea	1925	1984
Philip Minh Van Doan / St. Philip Minh	1853	Annam	1900	1988
Peter Quy Cong Doan / St. Peter Quy	1859	Annam	1909	1988
Paul Loc Le Van / St. Paul Loc	1859	Annam	1909	1988
John Hoan Trinh Doan / St. John Hoan	1861	Annam	1909	1988
Joseph Luu Van Nguyen / St. Joseph Luu	1861	Annam	1909	1988

=== Notable alumni ===
The college has produced many notable alumni both in the religious and secular vocations:

==== Saints and martyrs ====
- 2 canonised professors martyred in Korea (see above)
- 5 canonised seminarians martyred in Vietnam (see above)
- 50 beatified Vietnamese Martyrs

==== Archbishops ====
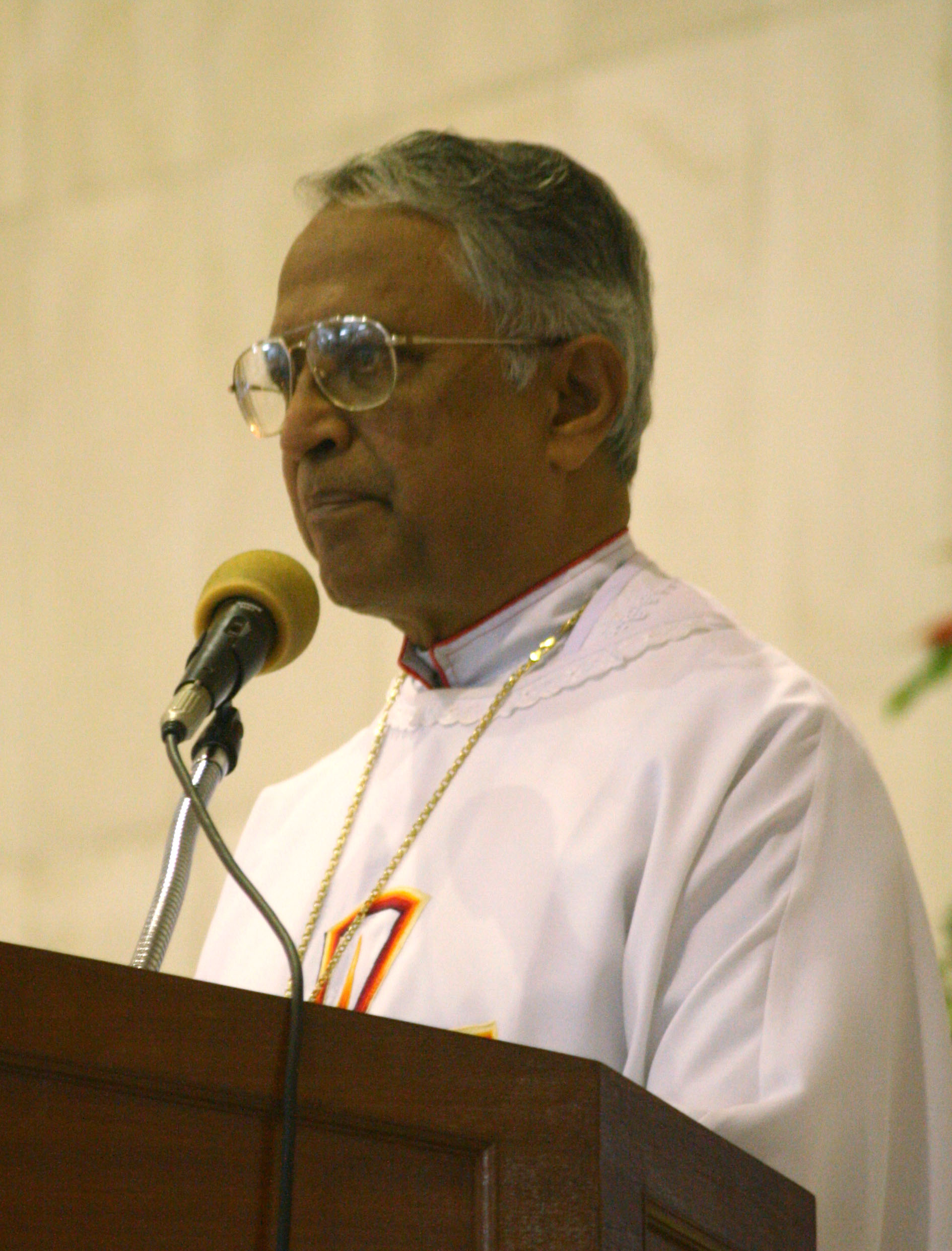
Archbishop Tan Sri Datuk Murphy Pakiam, Metropolitan Archbishop Emeritus of Kuala Lumpur

- John Joseph U Win

Auxiliary Bishop of Mandalay, Burma (1954–1959); Archbishop of Mandalay, Burma (1959–1965)

- Dominic Vendargon

Bishop of Kuala Lumpur, Malaysia (1955–1972); Archbishop of Kuala Lumpur, Malaysia (1972–1983)

- Gabriel Thohey Mahn-Gaby

Coadjutor Archbishop of Rangoon, Burma (1964–1971); Titular Archbishop of Staurapolis, Asia Minor (1964–1971); Archbishop of Rangoon, Burma (1971–2002)

- Aloysius Moses U Ba Khim

Archbishop of Mandalay, Burma (1965–1978)

- Gregory Yong Sooi Ngean

Bishop of Penang, Malaysia (1968–1977); Archbishop of Singapore, Singapore (1977–2000)

- Anthony Soter Fernandez

Bishop of Penang, Malaysia (1977–1983); Archbishop of Kuala Lumpur, Malaysia (1983–2003)

- Lawrence Khai Saen-Phon-On

Archbishop of Thare and Nonseng, Thailand (1980–2004)

- John Lee Hiong Fun-Yit Yaw

Bishop of Kota Kinabalu, Malaysia (1987–2008), Archbishop of Kota Kinabalu, Malaysia (2008–2012)

- Murphy Nicholas Xavier Pakiam

Auxiliary Bishop of Kuala Lumpur, Malaysia (1995–2003); Titular Bishop of Chunavia, Epirus Nova (1995–2003); Archbishop of Kuala Lumpur (2003–2013)

- Julian Leow Beng Kim

Archbishop of Kuala Lumpur (2014–present)

==== Bishops ====
- Jean Baptiste Tran-Huu-Duc

Vicar Apostolic of Vinh, Vietnam (1951–1960); Bishop of Vinh, Vietnam (1960–1971)

- George Maung Kyaw

Bishop of Bassein, Burma (1955–1968)

- Francis Chan

Bishop of Penang, Malaysia (1955–1967)

- Sebastian U Shwe Yauk

Bishop of Toungoo, Burma (1961–1988)

- Paul Nguyen-Dình Nhien

Coadjutor Bishop of Vinh, Vietnam (1963–1969); Titular Bishop of Gisipa, Carthage (1963–1969)

- Joseph Mahn Erie

Bishop of Bassein, Burma (1968–1982)

- Abraham Than

Auxiliary Bishop of Kengtung, Burma (1968–1972); Titular Bishop of Tortibulum, Italy (1968–1972); Bishop of Kengtung, Burma (1972–2001)

- Lawrence Thienchai Samanchit

Bishop of Chanthaburi, Thailand (1971–present)

- James Chan Soon Cheong

Bishop of Malacca-Johore, Malaysia (1973–2001)

- Joseph Devellerez Thaung Shwe

Bishop of Prome, Burma (1975–present)

- Simon Michael Fung Kui Heong

Vicar Apostolic of Kota Kinabalu, Malaysia (1975–1976); Titular Bishop of Catabum Castra, Mauretania Caesariensis (1975–1976); Bishop of Kota Kinabalu, Malaysia (1976–1985)

- Anthony Lee Kok Hin

Bishop of Miri, Malaysia (1977–2013)

- Anthony Selvanayagam

Auxiliary Bishop of Kuala Lumpur, Malaysia (1980–1983), Titular Bishop of Giru Mons, Mauretania Caesariensis (1980–1983), Bishop of Penang (1983–present)

- Dominic Su Haw Chiu

Bishop of Sibu, Malaysia (1986–2011)

- Cornelius Piong

Bishop of Keningau, Malaysia (1992–present)
