= Catholic Bishops' Conference of Malaysia, Singapore and Brunei =

Assembly of bishops of Malaysia, Singapore and Brunei of the Latin Church

- Abbreviation: CBCMSB
- Formation: 1964
- Type: Episcopal conference
- Legal status: Civil nonprofit
- Purpose: To support the ministry of bishops
- Region served: Malaysia, Singapore and Brunei
- Members: Active Catholic bishops of Malaysia, Singapore and Brunei
- President: Julian Leow Beng Kim
- Affiliations: Federation of Asian Bishops' Conferences
- Website: https://cbcmsb.org/

The Catholic Bishops' Conference of Malaysia, Singapore, and Brunei (CBCMSB) is the episcopal conference representing the Catholic Church in the countries of Malaysia, Singapore, and Brunei. The conference serves as a collaborative body of bishops, including diocesan bishops, coadjutors, auxiliary bishops, and diocesan administrators, who collectively oversee and guide the Church's activities in these three countries. The CBCMSB is pivotal in addressing pastoral, liturgical, and social issues relevant to the region's Catholic community.

== History and purpose ==
The CBCMSB was formally constituted to enable the bishops of the region to "exercise jointly the pastoral office by way of promoting the greater good which the Church offers mankind, especially through forms and programs of the apostolate which are fittingly adapted to the circumstances of age". This mandate reflects the commitment of the bishops to foster a spirit of communion and co-responsibility, allowing them to address matters of common concern and to pursue coordinated policies in their pastoral duties. The conference also seeks to establish and maintain relations with other bishops' conferences, thereby aligning its efforts with the broader Catholic Church.

== Structure and governance ==
The governance of the CBCMSB is centered around its executive body, which includes the President, Vice President, Secretary, Treasurer, and Executive Secretary. These office bearers are elected for a term of two years, which is renewable, with the exception of the Executive Secretary, who holds a permanent position.

The following is the organisational structure of the CBCMSB for the term 2023 to 2025.

- President: Archbishop Julian Leow Beng Kim, Archbishop of Kuala Lumpur
- Vice President: Cardinal William Goh Seng Chye, Archbishop of Singapore
- Episcopal Secretary: Bishop Richard Ng, Bishop of Miri
- Treasurer: Bishop Bernard Paul, Bishop of Melaka–Johor
- Executive Secretary: Richard Chia

Additionally, the CBCMSB oversees 15 Regional Episcopal Commissions, each headed by a Bishop President, who are responsible for various areas of church ministry and governance.

- Commission for Biblical: Bishop Richard Ng, Bishop of Miri
- Commission for Consecrated Life: Cardinal Sebastian Francis, Bishop of Penang
- Commission for Diocesan Priests and Seminaries: Bishop Richard Ng, Bishop of Miri
- Commission for Ecumenism and Interreligious: Archbishop Julian Leow Beng Kim, Archbishop of Kuala Lumpur
- Commission for Family, Laity and Life: Archbishop John Wong Soo Kau, Archbishop of Kota Kinabalu
- Commission for Youth-Campus Ministry: Archbishop Simon Peter Poh Hoon Seng, Archbishop of Kuching
- Commission for Liturgy: Cardinal William Goh Seng Chye, Archbishop of Singapore
- Commission for New Evangelisation (including the Pontifical Mission Societies): Bishop Julius Dusin Gitom, Bishop of Sandakan
- Commission for Pastoral Healthcare: Bishop Cornelius Piong, Bishop of Keningau
- Commission for Migrants, Itinerants and Victims of Trafficking: Bishop Bernard Paul, Bishop of Melaka–Johor
- Commission for Integral Human Development: Bishop Bernard Paul, Bishop of Melaka–Johor
- Commission for Creation Justice: Bishop Joseph Hii Teck Kwong, Bishop of Sibu
- Commission for Social Communications: Cardinal Sebastian Francis, Bishop of Penang
- Commission for Malaysian Catechetical: Bishop Joseph Hii Teck Kwong, Bishop of Sibu
- Commission for Malaysian Catholic Education Council: Cardinal Sebastian Francis, Bishop of Penang

== Current members ==
Malaysia

- Dato' Sri Sebastian Francis, Bishop of Penang, Cardinal
- Julian Leow Beng Kim, Archbishop of Kuala Lumpur
- Datuk John Wong Soo Kau, Archbishop of Kota Kinabalu
- Simon Peter Poh Hoon Seng, Archbishop of Kuching
- Bernard Paul, Bishop of Malacca-Johor
- Datuk Cornelius Piong, Bishop of Keningau
- Datuk Julius Dusin Gitom, Bishop of Sandakan
- Joseph Hii Teck Kwong, Bishop of Sibu
- Richard Ng, Bishop of Miri

Singapore

- William Goh Seng Chye, Archbishop of Singapore, Cardinal

Brunei

- Robert Leong, Apostolic Administrator of Brunei

== Living former members ==
- (Malaysia) Tan Sri Datuk Murphy Nicholas Xavier Pakiam, Archbishop Emeritus of Kuala Lumpur
- (Malaysia) Datuk John Lee Hiong Fun-Yit Yaw, Archbishop Emeritus of Kota Kinabalu
- (Malaysia) Dato John Ha Tiong Hock, Archbishop Emeritus of Kuching
- (Malaysia) Dato Sri Peter Chung Hoan Ting, Archbishop Emeritus of Kuching
- (Malaysia) Paul Tan Chee Ing, S.J., Bishop Emeritus of Malacca-Johor
- (Malaysia) Anthony Selvanayagam, Bishop Emeritus of Penang
- (Malaysia) Dominic Su Haw Chiu, Bishop Emeritus of Sibu
- (Malaysia) Anthony Lee Kok Hin, Bishop Emeritus of Miri

== List of past and present presidents ==
The list of presidents of the CBCMSB, who are elected by their brother bishops, the diocese or archdiocese they led during their tenure, and their dates of service as president:

1. Archbishop Michel Olçomendy MEP, Archbishop of Singapore (1964–1969)
2. Bishop Anthony Denis Galvin MHM, Bishop of Miri (1969–1976)
3. Archbishop Peter Chung Hoan Ting, Archbishop of Kuching (1976–1979)
4. Archbishop Gregory Yong Sooi Ngean, Archbishop of Singapore (1980–1987)
5. Archbishop Anthony Soter Fernandez, later Cardinal, Archbishop of Kuala Lumpur (1987–1990)
6. Archbishop Gregory Yong Sooi Ngean, Archbishop of Singapore (1990–1994)
7. Archbishop Peter Chung Hoan Ting, Archbishop of Kuching (1994–2000)
8. Archbishop Anthony Soter Fernandez, later Cardinal, Archbishop of Kuala Lumpur (2000–2003)
9. Archbishop Nicholas Chia Yeck Joo, Archbishop of Singapore (2003–2007)
10. Archbishop Murphy Nicholas Xavier Pakiam, Archbishop of Kuala Lumpur (2007–2011)
11. Bishop Paul Tan Chee Ing SJ, Bishop of Melaka–Johor (2011–2012)
12. Archbishop John Ha Tiong Hock, Archbishop of Kuching (2012–2016)
13. Bishop Sebastian Francis, later Cardinal, Bishop of Penang (2016–2023)
14. Archbishop Julian Leow Beng Kim, Archbishop of Kuala Lumpur (2023–present)

== See also ==
- Roman Catholicism in Malaysia
- Roman Catholicism in Singapore
- Roman Catholicism in Brunei
