= Dominic Vendargon =

Ceylon Tamil priest and Roman Catholic archbishop

The Most Reverend Tan Sri Dominic Vendargon PSM
- Archbishop of Kuala Lumpur
- Vendargon as Archbishop, c.1960s
- Church: Roman Catholic Church
- Archdiocese: Kuala Lumpur
- Installed: 18 December 1972
- Term ended: 2 July 1983
- Successor: Anthony Soter Fernandez

Orders
- Ordination: 8 December 1934
- Consecration: 21 August 1955 by Michel Olçomendy, Louis-August Chorin and Charles Joseph van Melckebeke

Personal details
- Born: 29 August 1909 Naranthanai, Ceylon
- Died: 3 August 2005 (aged 95) Kuala Lumpur, Malaysia
- Buried: St. John's Cathedral, Kuala Lumpur
- Education: St Francis Xavier Seminary; College General

Dominic Aloysius Vendargon (29 August 1909 – 3 August 2005) was a Ceylon Tamil priest and Roman Catholic Archbishop of Kuala Lumpur.

== Early life and family ==
Vendargon was born on 29 August 1909 in Naranthanai in northern Ceylon. Vendargon and his mother moved to Malaya, where his father worked as a surveyor, in 1910. Following the outbreak of World War I Vendargon, his siblings and mother returned to Ceylon. After the war the family rejoined Vendargon's father in Seremban in 1919. The family moved to Malacca in 1923.

Vendargon was educated at St Patrick's College, Jaffna, St Paul's, Seremban, and St Francis' Institution, Malacca.

Despite his father wanting Vendargon to be a doctor, Vendargon entered the St Francis Xavier Seminary in Singapore in 1925 before transferring to the College General in Penang in 1927.

== Career ==
Vendargon was ordained as a priest on 8 December 1934. As vicar for Indians in Negri Sembilan he was responsible for the pastoral care of Roman Catholics working in the rubber plantations. He was transferred to Sungai Petani in Kedah in 1941. After the Japanese invasion of Malaya, all of Vendargon's books and records were destroyed by Japanese troops. He spent the Japanese occupation years ministering to families in Kedah, Perlis, Kelantan and Trengganu.

After the war Vendargon started teaching at the College General in 1948 before becoming vicar for Indians in Johor Bahru and the Singapore Naval Base in 1949. He was transferred to Teluk Anson in 1950 before becoming vicar of St. Anthony's Church, Kuala Lumpur in 1951, a post he held until 1955.

Vendargon was appointed Bishop of Kuala Lumpur on 25 February 1955. He was ordained as a bishop on 21 August 1955. He became the first Archbishop of Kuala Lumpur on 18 December 1972. He retired on 2 July 1983.

Vendargon was a member of the Association for the Promotion of Higher Education Malaysia, the Guild of Catholic Assisted Schools Malaysia and Malaysian Inter-Religious Association. He was also the first president of the Malaysian Consultative Council of Buddhism, Christianity, Hinduism and Sikhism. He was made a Panglima Setia Mahkota in June 1968.

Vendargon died on 3 August 2005 at an old peoples home in Cheras, Kuala Lumpur run by the Little Sisters of the Poor. He was buried in the nave of St. John's Cathedral, Kuala Lumpur. The Tan Sri Dominic Vendargon Foundation was named after Vendargon.

== Honours ==
- Malaysia
  - Commander of the Order of Loyalty to the Crown of Malaysia (PSM) – Tan Sri (1968)
