= Catholic Church in Malaysia =

- Malay: Gereja Katolik di Malaysia
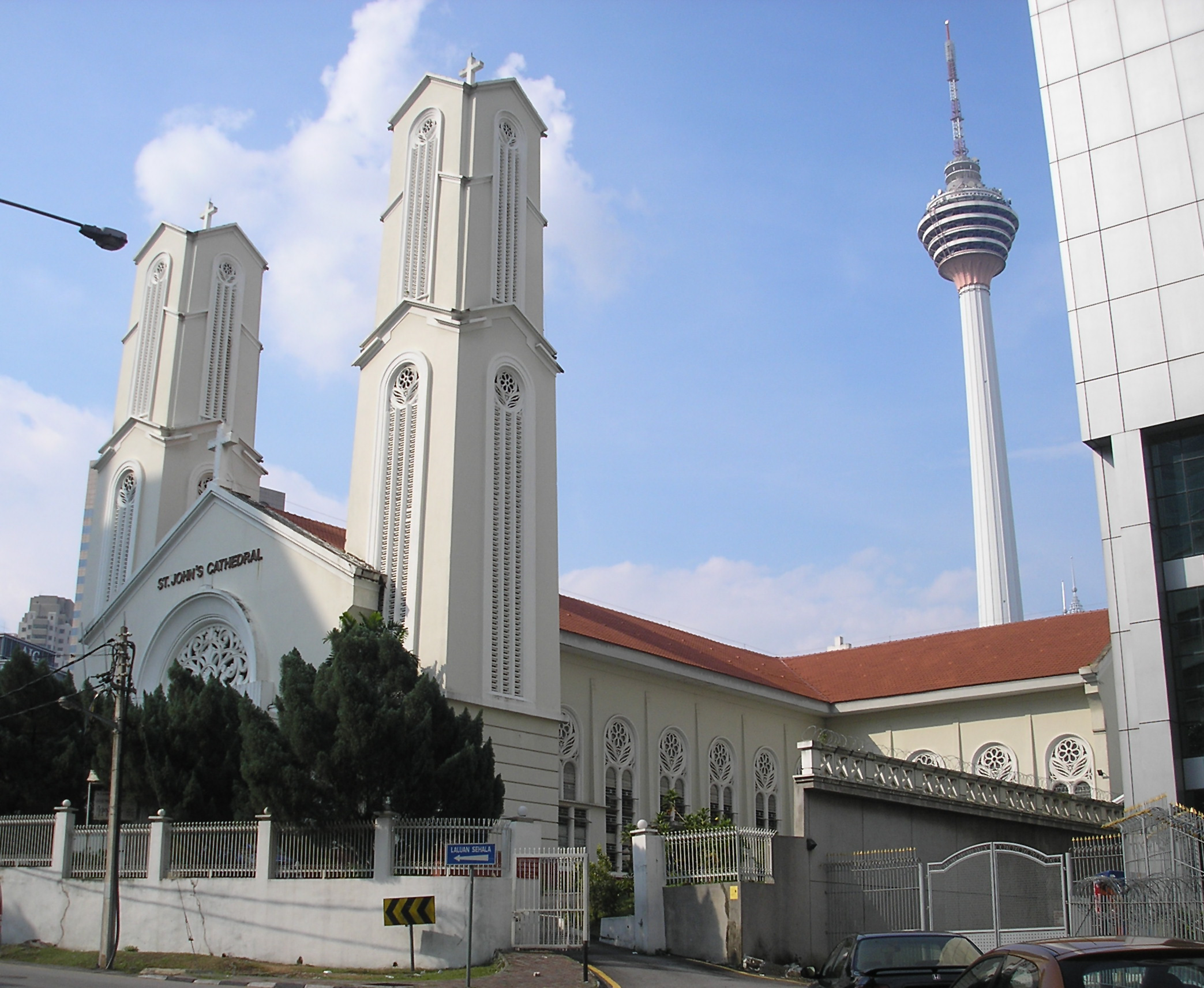
- Cathedral of Saint John in Kuala Lumpur
- Type: National polity
- Classification: Catholic
- Orientation: Latin
- Scripture: Bible
- Theology: Catholic theology
- Polity: Episcopal
- Governance: Catholic Bishops' Conference of Malaysia, Singapore and Brunei
- Pope: Leo XIV
- Apostolic Nuncio: Wojciech Załuski
- Region: Malaysia
- Language: Latin, Malaysian language, English, Chinese, Tamil, Telugu, Malayalam, Panjabi, Kadazan, Dusun, Bidayuh, Iban, Thai, Korean
- Headquarters: Petaling Jaya, Selangor, Malaysia
- Origin: 1511; Malacca, Malacca Sultanate
- Branched from: Catholic Church in Portugal
- Members: 1,292,000 (2021)

The Catholic Church in Malaysia is part of the worldwide Catholic Church, under the spiritual leadership of the pope in Rome. The apostolic nuncio to Malaysia is currently Archbishop Wojciech Załuski, who was appointed on 22 September 2020; The current resident ambassador of Malaysia to the Holy See is Hendy anak Assan.

The first Catholic priests landed in Malacca in 1511 as military chaplains to the Portuguese. The missionaries were Franciscan and Dominican friars. Malacca subsequently became a stopover for thousands of missionaries who spread the faith to South and Far East Asia. Until today, small Christian communities can be found in these places as a result of missionary zest. Malacca holds a special place in the history of the Church in this region.

== First wave of evangelisation ==
From the 7th to the 14th century, numerous small kingdoms which were strongly Hindu, existed at river mouths. The Sri Vijaya Empire extended its great influence to the region. In 1403, a prince from Sumatra, Parameswara, founded Malacca. He later converted to Islam and took the name of Sri Maharaja Mohammed Shah.

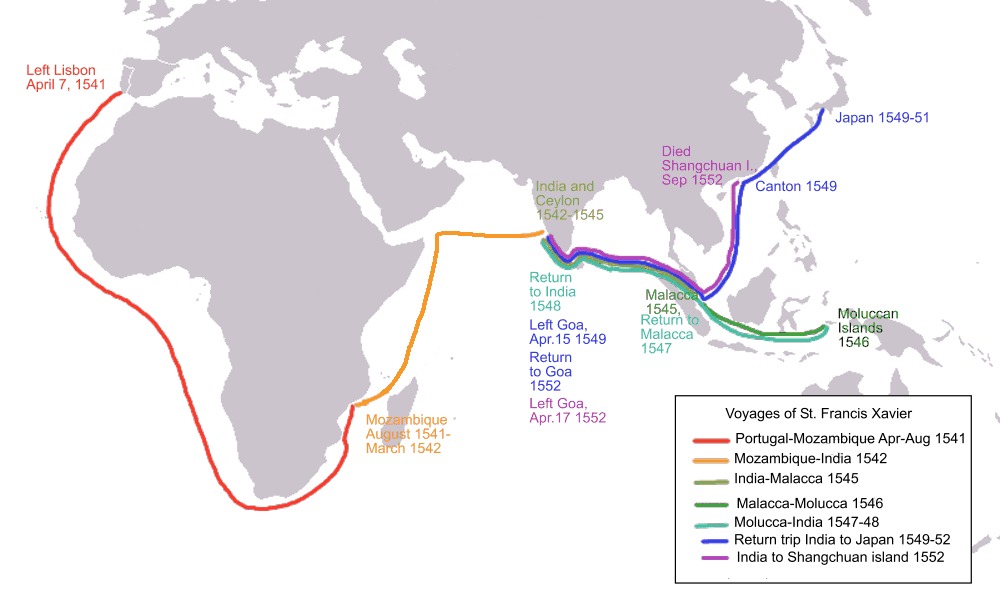
Voyages of St. Francis Xavier, a Catholic missionary who preached in Malacca

The year 1511 marked the arrival of the Portuguese, led by Admiral Afonso de Albuquerque, and the first Catholic chaplains. The Portuguese captured Malacca for its well-known spice trade. Between 1545 and 1552, St Francis Xavier preached in Malacca. By 1557, Malacca was raised to a suffragan see (deputy diocese). In 1641, the occupation of Malacca by the Dutch began and the authorities in power suppressed Catholicism. The bishops and priests fled to Timor.

== Second wave of evangelisation ==
In 1786, Sir Francis Light took over Penang from the sultan of Kedah. Finally, in 1809, the College General in Penang was opened again and seminarians from all over Asia came to be trained there. In 1819, Sir Stamford Raffles took residence in Singapore. In 1824, the Anglo-Dutch Treaty was signed and the Netherlands exchanged Malacca for Bencoolan, Indonesia. Later, in 1826, Penang, Province Wellesley, Malacca and Singapore became the Straits Settlement under British rule. In 1852, the Sisters of St Maur or the Infant Jesus sisters (IJ) and the Institute of the Brothers of the Christian Schools (La Salle Brothers) sailed over to found Christian schools in major towns in Peninsular Malaysia. The sisters also began orphanages. In 1864, Chinese tin miners settled at the confluence of the muddy Klang and Gombak river mouth, the beginning of Kuala Lumpur. In 1874, the Treaty of Pangkor marked the direct British rule over the Malay states, while the sultans still maintained religious sovereignty. By the end of the 19th century, Malaysia was booming with massive immigration of Chinese and Indians who were invited to work in the tin mines, rubber plantation and railways by the British.

Catholicism first came to North Borneo (now Sabah), when a Spanish mariner turned priest, Carlos Cuarteroni, established a Catholic mission in 1857 in Labuan, with stations established in Brunei and Looc Porin (now Kota Kinabalu). However, problems with his assistants left him alone from 1860 and the mission made little progress, and he returned to Spain. The Catholic Mill Hill Missionaries arrived in North Borneo in 1882 to re-establish the Spaniards' effort, and focused mainly on the Chinese and indigenous communities, such as the Kadazan-Dusun people.

Meanwhile, in Sarawak, the Mill Hill Missionaries was invited by the White Rajahs in the hope that it would be a stabilizing influence on the native Iban people.

== Second World War and the Emergency (1940–1975) ==
During the years 1942–1945 of the Second World War and the Japanese occupation, schools were closed, and the people suffered a lot. In the years 1948–1960, the communist insurrection was very hostile to the Catholic Church. On 1 February 1948, the Federation of Malaya Government was formed. In 1955, the two dioceses of Kuala Lumpur and Penang were created and the consecration of first local bishops Dominic Vendargon and Francis Chan took place. In 1957, on 31 August, Malaya gained independence, and its first prime minister, Tunku Abdul Rahman, was appointed. In 1962, Pope John XXIII called for the renewal of the Church and opened the Second Vatican Council. On 16 September 1963, a big country uniting Malaysia with Singapore, Sabah and Sarawak was created, but by 1965, Singapore broke up with Malaysia and became an independent republic. On 13 May 1969, racial violence and killings were recorded in the aftermath of the elections. A state of emergency was declared and a curfew imposed. In 1970, the New Economic Policy was introduced with quota systems. Over the decade, Christians were discriminated against and Catholic and other Christian missionaries were expelled from Sabah. However, in 1972, the new diocese of Malacca-Johor was created, making a total of six in Malaysia (three in the West, and three in Eastern Malaysia). In 1973, Malaysia became the first ASEAN country to recognise China. From 1970 to 1975, the resurgence of communist activities in the north and in urban centres created more political mayhem and led to persecutions against the Christians. In 1974, the first permanent deacon from Malaysia was ordained. Between 1975 and 1980, Vietnamese refugees (boat people) arrived in throngs and put a new stress on the country. In 1976, a month-long Aggiornamento (in Penang) for bishops and priests of West Malaysia was held. A vision for the Peninsular Malaysia Church was formulated.

== The consolidation of the Catholic faith (1977–2001) ==
Parallel to the economic and industrial development of the nation, the Catholic Church in Malaysia grew considerably during these years, emphasising on inter-religious dialogue, oecumenism and religious freedom.

In 1977, the first Catholic Charismatic Convention was organised in Ipoh. In 1979, the Asian Bishop's Institute for Social Action met in Kuala Lumpur for dialogue on religions. In 1981, a new gathering of all priests from West Malaysia to review the Aggiornamento of 1976 was organised. In 1983, the Malaysian Consultative Council on Buddhism, Christianity, Hinduism, Sikhism (MCCBCHS) for dialogue was formed to represent their interests with the authorities. In the same way and with a spirit of oecumenism, the Christian Federation of Malaysia, consisting of the Catholic, Protestant and Evangelical churches were formed in 1984. In 1986, the Peninsular Malaysia Pastoral Convention (PMPC I) included Ministry to Youth as part of the core needs, besides poor, inter-religious dialogue, unity, formation and community building. In 1989, Sarawak made huge efforts in a successful attempt at renewal with a Eucharistic Congress, a Bible Year and a Bible Congress.

In 1995, churches in Sarawak requested the state to allow other faith education in schools besides Islam. In 1996, PMPA II gathered reviews and reaffirmed Aggiornamento 1976 and PMPC 1986. There was a renewed call for systematic and strategic planning and implementation. In 1998, the Deputy Prime Minister was arrested and the Reformasi movement started. In 1999, the Great Jubilee Year of redemption was declared open by Pope John Paul II. The first joint Community Spirituality retreat among bishops, priests, religious and laity was organised. In 2001, the First Peninsula Malaysia Young Catholic Leaders Forum or LEAD 2001 was organised. PMPA III was held at Kuala Lumpur re-emphasised BECs.

== Holy See relations ==
See: Holy See – Malaysia relations.

Diplomatic relations between Malaysia and the Holy See were initiated by Tun Dr Mahathir Mohammad when he met Pope John Paul II before his (Tun Mahathir) resignation. The negotiations continued on until Najib Razak became the prime minister. Malaysia established formal diplomatic relations with the Holy See in 2011 during a meeting between Prime Minister Datuk Seri Najib Razak and Pope Benedict XVI in Rome. Najib was accompanied by the Archbishop of Kuala Lumpur, Murphy Nicholas Xavier Pakiam. Archbishop Pakiam went to Vatican not as part of Malaysian Government, but was asked by Vatican to join the delegation as Church representative.

The first resident ambassador of Malaysia to the Holy See, Tan Sri Bernard Giluk Dompok, was elected in October 2015 by Pope Francis. The year 2017 marked the opening of the official chancery of the Holy See in Kuala Lumpur, Malaysia. Following the change of government from Barisan Nasional to Pakatan Harapan after the 14th general election, Bernard Giluk Dompok was terminated of his service on 30 June 2018.

Westmoreland Edward Palon, who was named by Wisma Putra as Malaysia's second ambassador to the Vatican on 21 March, is a Bidayuh who hails from Kampung Duras, Kuching.

The Apostolic Nunciature in Malaysia was established on the 27 July 2011 through an official act of the Holy See Acta Apostolicae Sedis. The current nuncio is Archbishop Wojciech Zaluski.

== 21st century ==
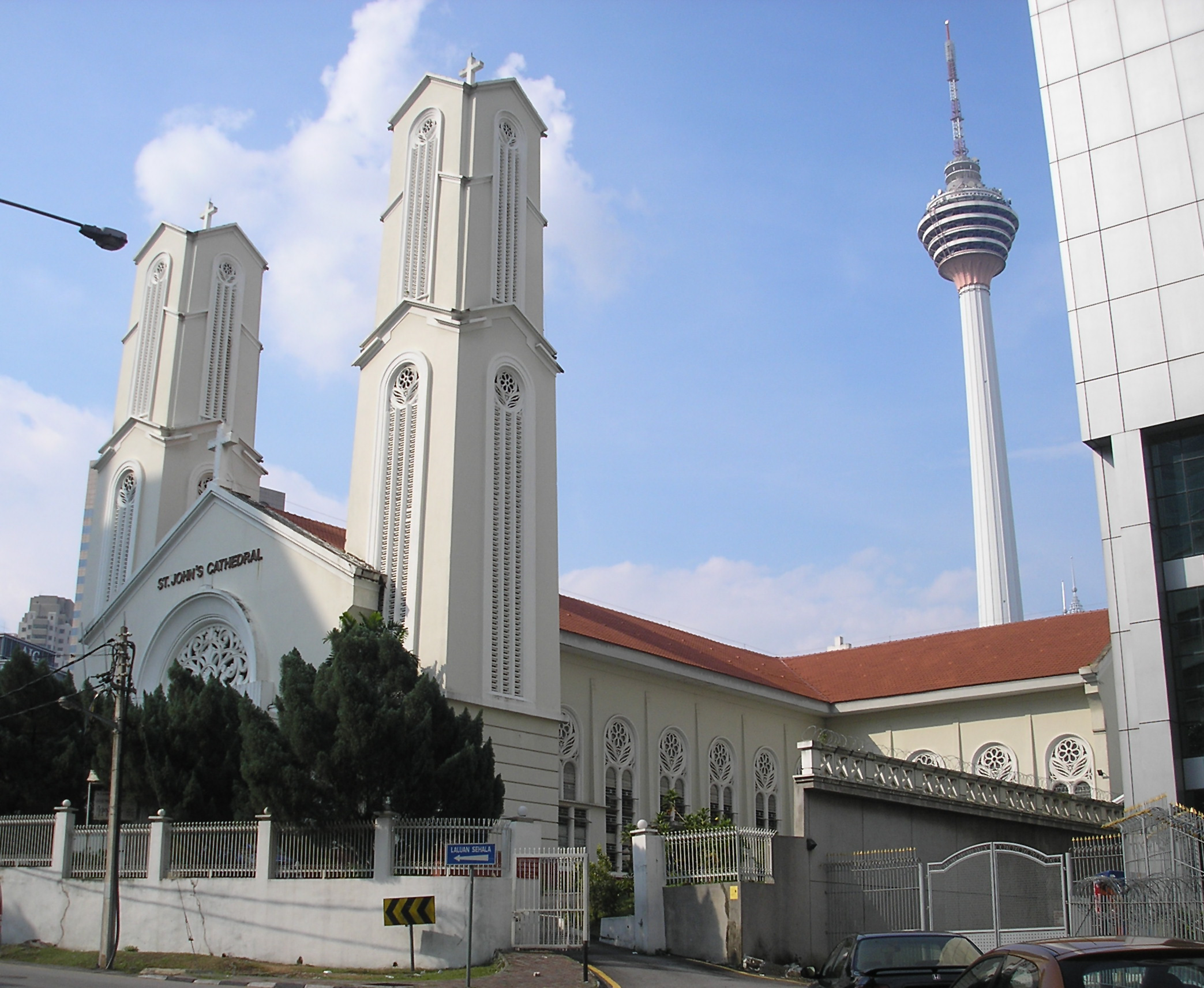
The Cathedral of St. John is the cathedral church of the Archdiocese of Kuala Lumpur.

As of 2020, half of Malaysian Christians were Catholic; this was 4.63% of the country's population.

The country is divided into nine dioceses including three archdioceses:

- Archdiocese of Kuala Lumpur
  - Diocese of Malacca Johore
  - Diocese of Penang
- Archdiocese of Kuching
  - Diocese of Miri
  - Diocese of Sibu
- Archdiocese of Kota Kinabalu
  - Diocese of Keningau
  - Diocese of Sandakan

=== Catholic publications ===
The Catholic Church in Malaysia has its own weekly newspaper, The Herald, distributed to all Catholic churches throughout Malaysia. Sabah and Sarawak also have their own local newspapers, such as Catholic Sabah (fortnightly), and Today's Catholic (monthly).

== Notable people ==
- Sebastian Francis – Malaysia's second Catholic cardinal, elevated on 30 September 2023.
- Anthony Soter Fernandez †- Malaysia's first Catholic cardinal, elevated on 19 November 2016.
- Tan Sri Datuk Seri Panglima Bernard Giluk Dompok – the first Ambassador of Malaysia to the Holy See (Vatican City).
- Charles Santiago - National Water Services Commission (SPAN) Chairman, politician and former Member of Parliament (MP) for Klang.
- Dato' Hans Isaac – Actor, producer, director and former model.
- Kasthuriraani Patto – politician and former Member of Parliament (MP) for Batu Kawan.
- Dato Pandelela Rinong Pamg – national diver and a two-time Olympic medalist.
- Yang Amat Berbahagia Tun Datuk Seri Panglima Richard Malanjum – the 9th Chief Justice of Malaysia.
- Teresa Kok – Member of Parliament for Seputeh and former Minister for Primary Industry.
- Dato Westmoreland Edward Palon – the second Ambassador of Malaysia to the Holy See (Vatican City).

== See also ==
- Christianity in Asia
- Christianity in Malaysia
- Religion in Malaysia
- Freedom of religion in Malaysia
