= Don Bosco Technical High School =

Don Bosco Technical High School may refer to:

- Don Bosco Technical High School (Boston)
- Don Bosco Technical High School (Paterson, NJ)
- Don Bosco Technical High School (Timor-Leste)
