= Host desecration =

Form of sacrilege in some Christian denominations

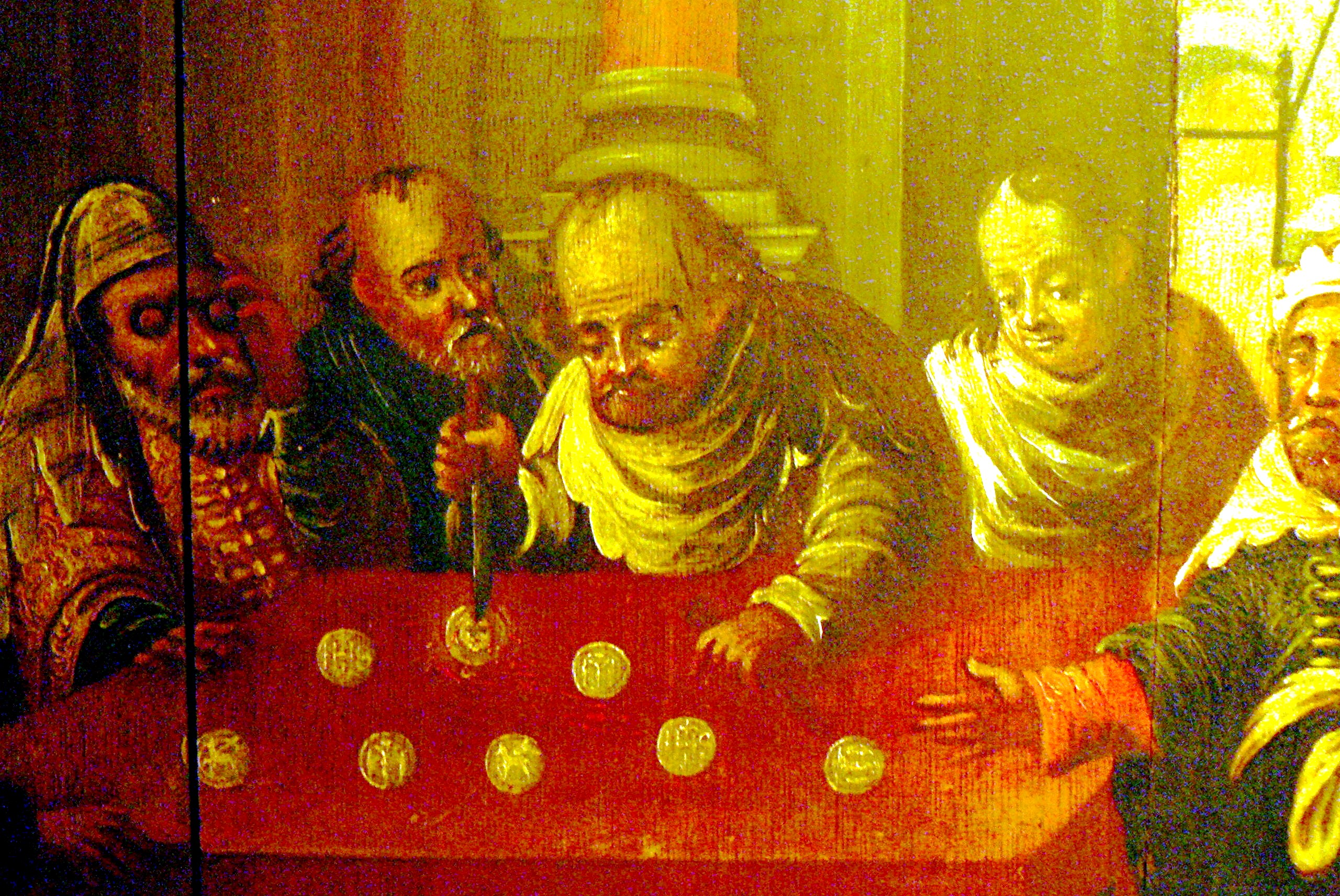
Painting (16th century) showing the alleged desecration of hosts by Jews in Passau in 1477 (detail), Oberhausmuseum (Passau)

Host desecration is a form of sacrilege in Christian denominations that follow the doctrine of the real presence of Christ in the Eucharist. It involves the mistreatment or malicious use of a consecrated host—the bread used in the Eucharistic service of the Divine Liturgy or Mass (also known by Protestants simply as Communion bread). It is forbidden by the Catholic, Oriental Orthodox, and Eastern Orthodox Churches, as well as in certain Protestant traditions (including Anglicanism, Lutheranism, and Methodism). In Catholicism, where the host is held to have been transubstantiated into the body of Jesus Christ, host desecration is one of the gravest sins. Intentional host desecration incurs the penalty of excommunication latae sententiae. Throughout history, a number of groups have been accused of desecrating the Eucharist, often with grave consequences due to the spiritual importance of the consecrated host.

Antisemitic accusations of Host desecration by Jews were a common reason given for massacres and expulsions throughout the Middle Ages in Europe. Similar accusations were made against Muslims, Protestants and in witchcraft trials; witch-hunter's guides such as the Malleus Maleficarum refer to hosts as being objects of desecration by witches. It is part of many descriptions of the Black Mass, both in ostensibly historical works and in fiction.

== Background ==
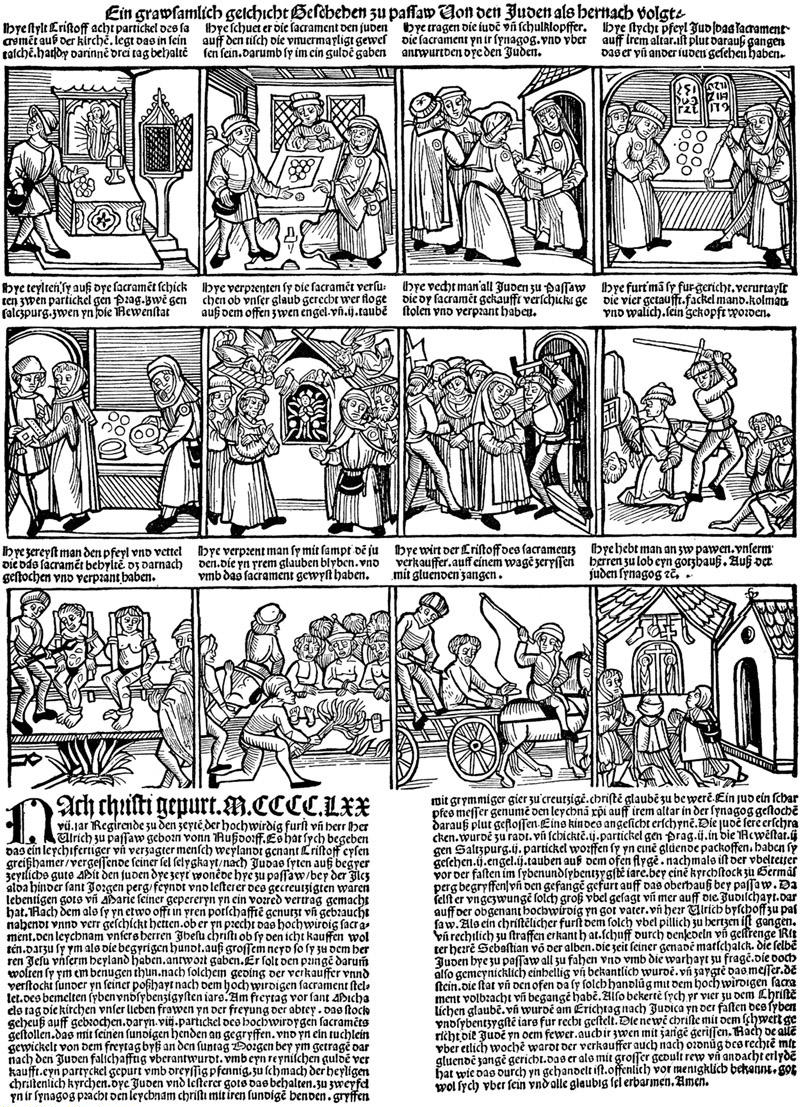
From a 15th-century German woodcut of the host desecration by the Jews of Passau, 1477. The hosts are stolen and sold to the Jewish community, who pierce them in a ritual. When guards come to question the Jews, they (the Jews) attempt to burn the Hosts, but are unsuccessful, as the Hosts transform into an infant carried by angels. The Jews, now proven guilty, are arrested, beheaded, and tortured with hot pincers, the entire community is driven out with their feet bound and held to the fire, and the Christian who sold the hosts to the Jews is punished. At the end the Christians kneel and pray.

In the Catholic Church, the transubstantiation of the Eucharist means the "body, blood, soul, and divinity" of Jesus Christ are present in the form of the consecrated host and adored. Theft, sale, or use of the host for a profane purpose is considered a grave sin and sacrilege, which incurs the penalty of excommunication, which is imposed automatically in the Latin Church (See Latin Church Code canon 1367, or Code of Canons of the Eastern Churches canon 1442.)

Some denominations, especially Lutherans, have similar beliefs regarding the Eucharist and the Real Presence, though they reject the Roman Catholic concept of transubstantiation, preferring instead the doctrine of the sacramental union, in which "the body and blood of Christ are so truly united to the bread and wine of the Holy Communion that the two may be identified. They are at the same time body and blood, bread and wine…in this sacrament the Lutheran Christian receives the very body and blood of Christ precisely for the strengthening of the union of faith." Both the Eastern Orthodox Churches and the Oriental Orthodox Churches, such as the Coptic Church, insist "on the reality of the change from bread and wine into the body and the blood of Christ at the consecration of the elements", although they have "never attempted to explain the manner of the change", thus rejecting philosophical terms to describe it.

The Methodist Church similarly holds that Jesus is truly present in the Eucharist "through the elements of bread and wine", but maintains that how he is present is a Holy Mystery. Until the 19th-century Oxford Movement reintroduced the classic doctrine of the Real Presence, Anglicanism had favored receptionism — the doctrine that while the bread and wine in the Eucharist continue to exist unchanged after consecration, the faithful communicant receives together with them the body and blood of Jesus. Whatever the doctrine selected, among Anglicans the consecrated bread and hosts are reserved and treated with great reverence.

Since the publication of Memoriale Domini in 1969, the Catholic Church has allowed certain countries to allow communicants to receive the Host in the hand, rather than directly onto the tongue, reviving an "ancient custom". Communion in the hand is now widespread in many parts of the world. The practice means that access to consecrated Hosts is easier than in the past, since the person receiving it in the hand may pretend to place it in their mouth for consumption. About this, Pope Benedict XVI cited: "I am not opposed in principle to Communion in the hand; I have both administered and received Communion in this way myself… The idea behind my current practice of having people kneel to receive Communion on the tongue was to send a signal and to underscore the Real Presence with an exclamation point" Receiving on the tongue is still the official norm of the Catholic Church, while receiving in the hand [via the Memoriale Domini indult] is, in English-speaking countries, the practical norm. Kneeling to receive communion is still the norm among Anglicans and Lutherans.

Host desecration is a crime in the 1983 Code of Canon Law.

== Medieval accusations against Jews ==
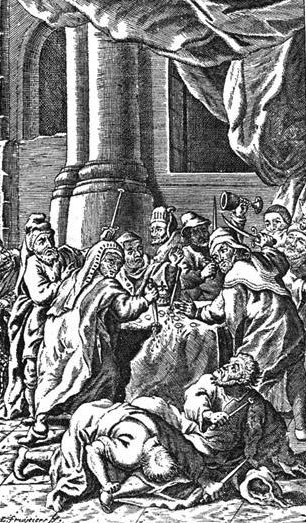
Jews depicted torturing the host, on a Belgian tapestry

Accusations of host desecration (German: Hostienschändung) leveled against Jews were a common pretext for massacres and expulsions throughout the Middle Ages in Europe. The libel of "Jewish deicide"—that the Jewish people were responsible for the killing of Jesus, whom Christians regard as God become man—was a generally accepted Christian belief. It was spuriously claimed that Jews stole hosts (objects to which they attached no significance, religious or otherwise), and further spuriously claimed that they abused these hosts to re-enact the crucifixion of Jesus by stabbing or burning them.

It has been asserted by modern scholars, such as the Catholic priest Gavin Langmuir, that these accusations against Jews represented profound doubt about the truth of Christianity. Although the doctrine of transubstantiation did not imply that, by consuming the host, Christians were eating flesh and drinking blood in the normal sense, the language used to describe the dogma would have been interpreted as completely alien to Judaism and Jewish law. For Jews, such a belief system would contradict their strict dietary laws, which forbid the consumption of blood, even when consuming kosher animals.

Jews in the Middle Ages were frequently victims of similar accusations, considered more serious than desecration of other revered items, such as relics or images of Jesus and the saints. The accusations were often supported only by the testimony of the accuser, who may potentially bear a prejudice against the accused Jew or the Jewish people. Despite this, some alleged perpetrators were tried and found guilty, on little evidence or through torture.

The penalties for Jews accused of defiling sacred hosts were severe. Many Jews, after accusations and torture, "confessed" to abusing hosts, and the accused Jews were condemned and burned, sometimes with all the other Jews in the community, as happened in Beelitz in 1243, in Prague in 1389, and in many German cities, according to Ocker's writings in the Harvard Theological Review. According to William Nichol, over 100 instances of Jews pleading guilty to the desecration of sacred hosts have been recorded.

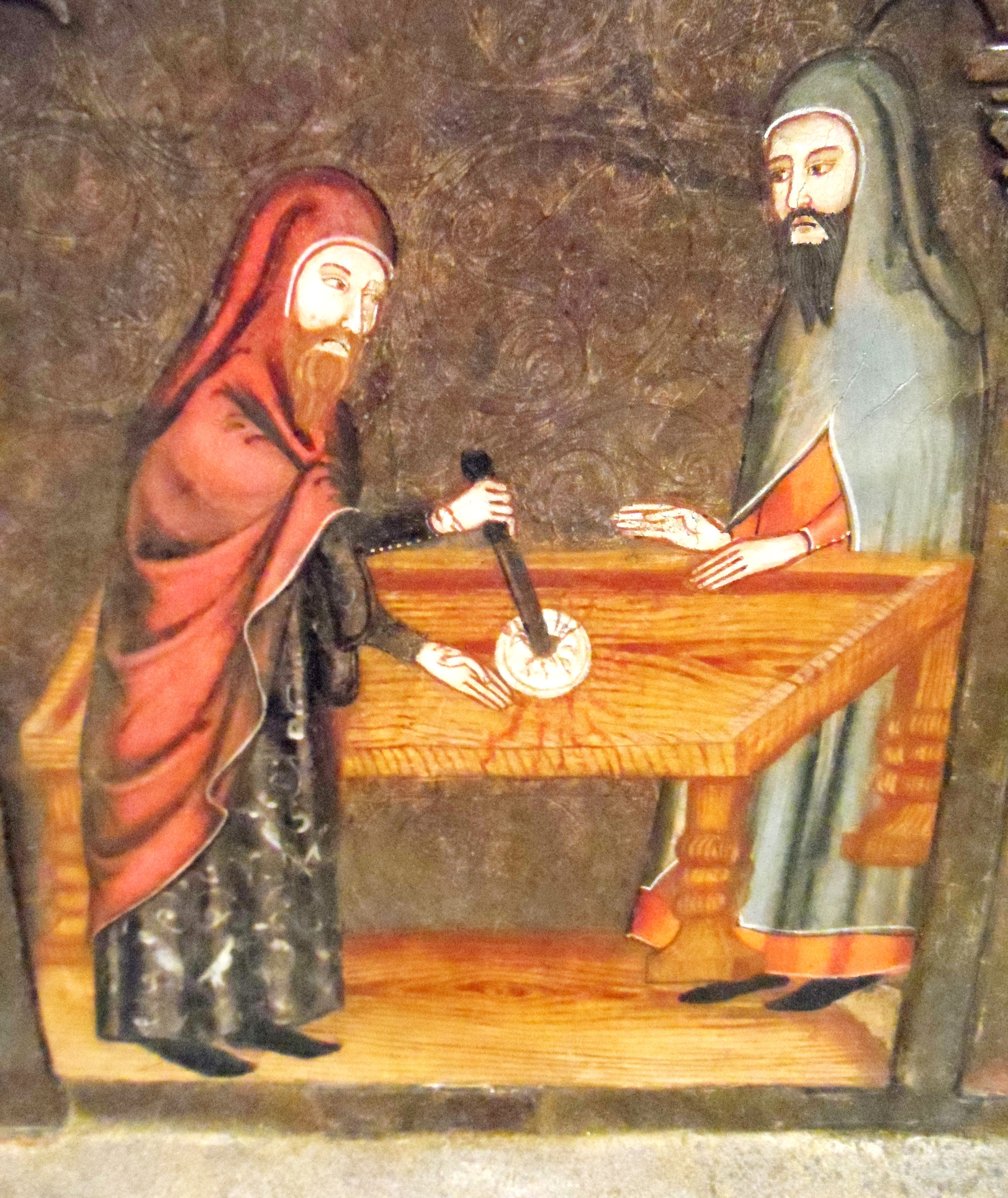
Medieval painting of host desecration by Jews, from the Museu Nacional d'Art de Catalunya

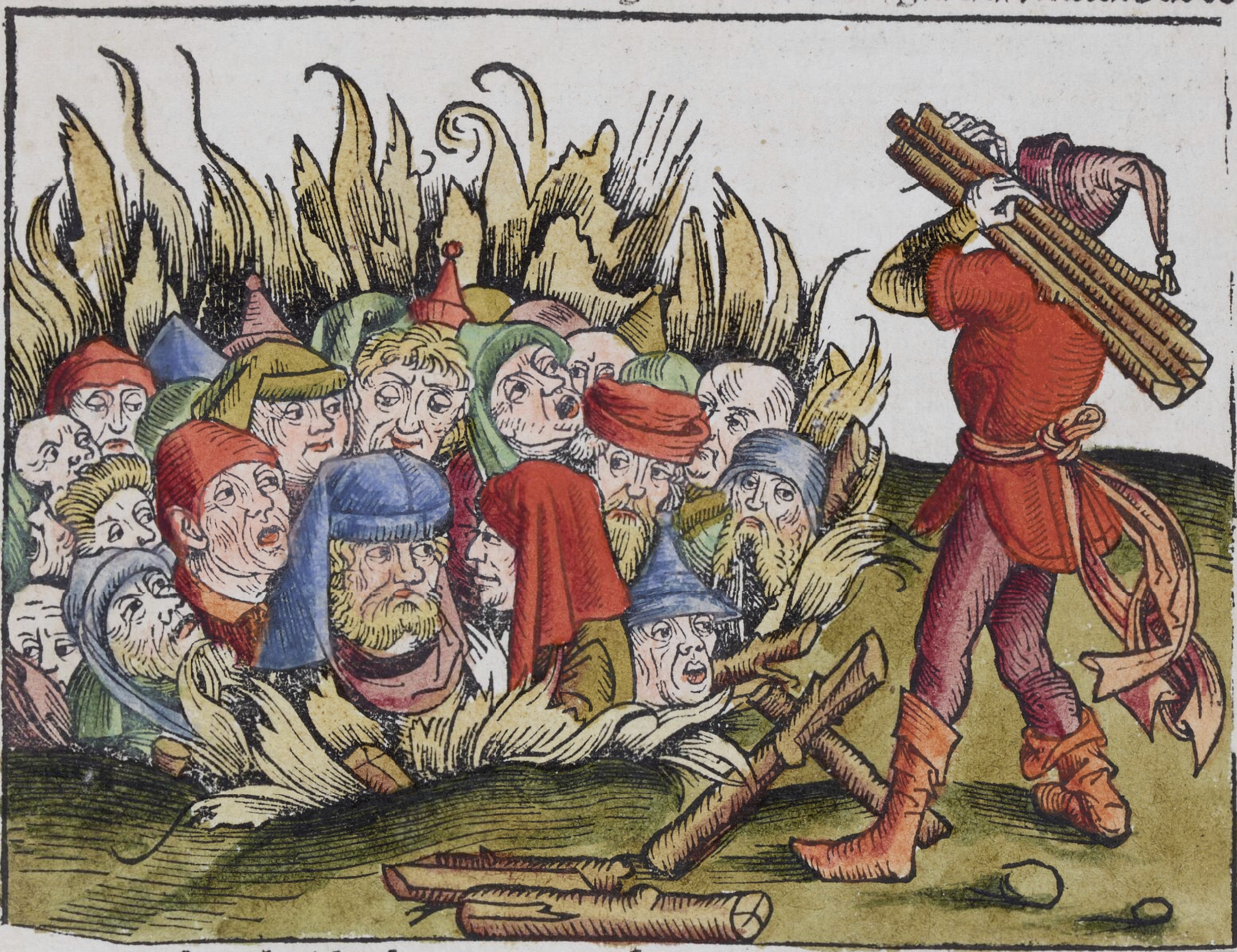
A colored woodcut in Liber Chronicarum (1493) depicts Jews being burned alive in Deggendorf.

The first recorded accusation was made in 1243 at Beelitz, south of Potsdam. Tradition records that as a consequence the Jews of Beelitz were burned on a hill before the Mill Gate, which was subsequently, and until 1945, called the Judenberg, although there is no contemporary evidence for the burnings in documents of the 13th century. Another famous case that took place in 1290, in Paris, was commemorated in the Church of the Rue des Billettes and in a local confraternity. The case of 1337, at Deggendorf, celebrated locally as part of the "Deggendorfer Gnad" until 1992, led to a series of massacres across the region. In 1370 in Brussels the charge of host desecration, linked to an actual recovered relic of desecrated hosts currently found in the Cathedral of St. Michael and St. Gudula and long celebrated in a special feast, and to artistic depictions also found in the cathedral, led to the burning of six Jews (other times given twenty) and, reportedly, the expulsion of the town's Jewish population (see Brussels massacre). In 1510, at Knoblauch in Havelland 38 Jews were executed and more expelled from Brandenburg.

An alleged host desecration in 1410, at Segovia, was said to have brought about an earthquake; as a result, leading Jews in the city were executed and the local synagogue was seized and re-dedicated as the convent and Church of Corpus Christi.

Similar accusations, resulting in extensive persecution of Jews, were brought forward in 1294, at Laa, Austria; 1298, at Röttingen, near Würzburg, and at Korneuburg, near Vienna; 1299, at Ratisbon; 1306, at St. Pölten; 1330, at Güstrow; 1338, at Pulkau; 1388, at Prague; 1401, at Glogau; 1420, at Enns; 1453, at Breslau; 1478, at Passau; 1492, at Sternberg, in Mecklenburg; 1514, at Mittelberg, in Alsace; 1556, at Sochaczew, in Poland. The last Jew burned for stealing a host died in 1631, according to Jacques Basnage, quoting from Menasseh Ben Israel. In some cases host desecration legends emerged without actual accusations, as was the case of the host desecration legend of Poznan (Posen).

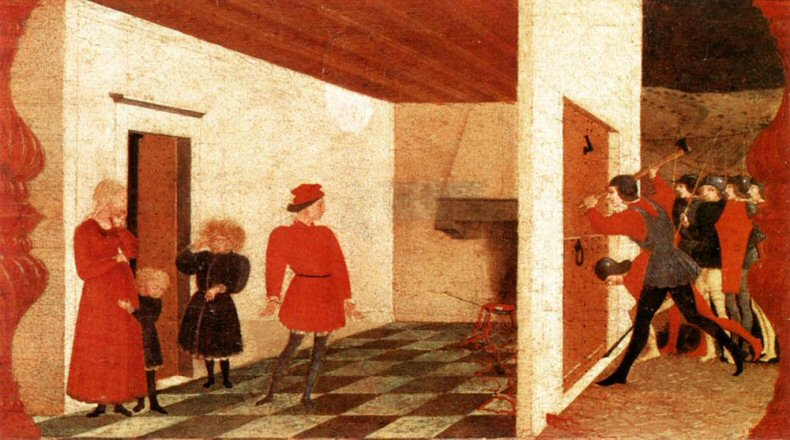
The second panel of Paolo Uccello's Miracle of the Profaned Host (c. 1467–1469) from the Urbino Confraternity of Corpus Domini predella. Based on the Paris 1290 legend, a Jewish moneylender is cooking the host, which emanates blood. The wife and children look on in terror as the blood pours into the street in rivers while soldiers break through the door.

The accusation of host desecration gradually ceased after the Reformation as more Christian denominations no longer believe in hosts being the body and blood of Christ. However, sporadic instances of host desecration libel occurred even in the 18th and 19th century. In 1761 in Nancy, several Jews from Alsace were executed on a charge of sacred host desecration. The last recorded accusation was brought up in Berlad, Romania, in 1836.

While not levelling the charge against contemporary Jews, the Fascist publications Der Stürmer and La Difesa della Razza both referenced the host desecration libel for purposes of antisemitic propaganda.

== Medieval accusations against Muslims ==
Juan Manuel included in his 1335 anthology El Conde Lucanor a tale about a treacherous priest who gave the Host to some Muslims, who then proceeded to drag it through the mud while mocking it. In 1465, Christians who opposed King Enrique IV of Castile defamed him by claiming that under his reign, "some Jews and Moors sought on several occasions to obtain a consecrated host" as well as other sacred objects "in order to perform various evil rites to harm our Lord, his holy church, and our faith." Sixteenth-century inquisitors and polemicists likewise accused former Muslims, whom they saw as false converts, of host desecration. For example, the Inquisition of Cuenca charged one former Muslim with purchasing stolen hosts and stringing them up in a latrine (as some former Judaists supposedly did). In a similar accusation, former Muslims allegedly stole a church's hosts and contemptuously threw them onto the ground.

== Accusations against Protestants ==
Since 1549, Counter-Reformers occasionally accused Protestants of desecrating the Host. For example, a Catholic account claims that in 1561 a group of French Protestants were so irritated by a church's bell-ringing that they responded by assaulting the church, harming and killing several parishioners, and intentionally desecrating the Host.

== 2008 controversy in the US ==
In his July 8 blog entry, University of Minnesota Morris biology professor Paul Zachary Myers criticized the reaction to a University of Central Florida student's perceived act of host desecration (the student had attempted to bring the host to a friend who was curious about communion). Myers described the level of harassment against the student and expressed his intent to desecrate the host, which the Catholic Church considers a grave matter.

Myers expressed outrage that Fox News appeared to be inciting viewers to cause further problems for the student and ridiculed reports that armed guards would attend the next Mass. Myers suggested that if any of his readers could acquire some consecrated Eucharistic hosts for him, he would treat the wafers "with profound disrespect and heinous cracker abuse, all photographed and presented here on the web."

A number of Catholics immediately reacted strongly. William A. Donohue of the Catholic League accused Myers of anti-Catholic bigotry, described his proposal as a threat to desecrate what Catholics hold to be the Body of Christ and sent a letter asking the University of Minnesota and the Minnesota State Legislature to take action against Myers.

Myers pierced a host with a rusty nail, which he also used to pierce a few ripped-out pages of the Quran and The God Delusion, put them all in the trash along with old coffee grounds and a banana peel. He provided a photograph on his blog of these items in the garbage and wrote that nothing must be held sacred, encouraging people to question everything. In addition, he described the history of allegations of host desecration, emphasizing the frequent use of such allegations in medieval Europe to justify anti-Semitism.

Subsequently, Myers explained to the Star Tribune that while his post was "satire and protest", he had received death threats regarding the incident but was not taking them too seriously. The University of Minnesota, Morris (UMM) Chancellor defended Myers, and stated: "I believe that behaviors that discriminate against or harass individuals or groups on the basis of their religious beliefs are reprehensible" and that the school "affirms the freedom of a faculty member to speak or write as a public citizen without institutional discipline or restraint."

== Al-Islam magazine ==
In 2009, two Muslim reporters from Al-Islam, a small Malaysian magazine, participated in a Catholic Mass, while undercover writing an article on cases of apostasy from Islam (riddah) and received Holy Communion. The reporters afterwards spat out the host and photographed it to prove they had not apostatised themselves. The resulting photo was then published in their May 2009 edition. The magazine, which is owned by Utusan Karya, part of the Utusan Malaysia Group, sent its reporters, including Muhd Ridwan Abdul Jalil, to two churches in the Klang Valley, as part of a special investigative report. The act of desecration occurred at St Anthony's Church in Jalan Robertson, Kuala Lumpur.

After its publication, two lay Catholics from Penang, Sudhagaran Stanley and Joachim Francis Xavier, jointly lodged a police report against the reporters. The police took no action despite a potential charge under Section 298A(1) of the Penal Code for causing disharmony, disunity or feelings of enmity, hatred or ill will, or prejudicing the maintenance of harmony or unity, on grounds of religion.

The desecration caused widespread outrage and condemnation from non-Muslims as well as Muslims across the country. Parties including the Archbishop of Kuala Lumpur, Murphy Pakiam; the Catholic Lawyers Society; as well as numerous editorials in the media, criticised the government and the Attorney-General for its failure to act.

Some nine months later, in early March 2010, Al-Islam published an apology to the Catholic Church and other Christians for the article. It was posted on the website of its publisher. Archbishop Pakiam, who is also president of the Catholic Bishops' Conference of Malaysia, Singapore and Brunei, accepted the apology and said that no further legal action would be taken.

== During a Black Mass ==
A Black Mass is a ritual designed to satirize or invert a Catholic mass, and performed by many Satanist groups. Consecrated hosts are a common ingredient in black masses, becoming the subject of desecration. The hosts must first be stolen from the tabernacle of a Catholic church, and/or secreted away by people who are posing as parishioners receiving communion.

In 2014, the Dakhma of Angra Mainyu held a public Black Mass at the Oklahoma Civic Center and planned to include the desecration of a consecrated host, which was to be "stomped on". Instead, the host was returned through an attorney after the archdiocese filed a lawsuit for its recovery.

== See also ==
- Cake of Light
- Blood libel against Jews
- Eucharist
- Real presence of Christ in the Eucharist
- Transubstantiation
- Black mass
