= Sant'Alberto Magno =

Titular church in Rome, Italy

- Church of Albertus Magnus (in English); Sancti Alberto Magna (in Latin)
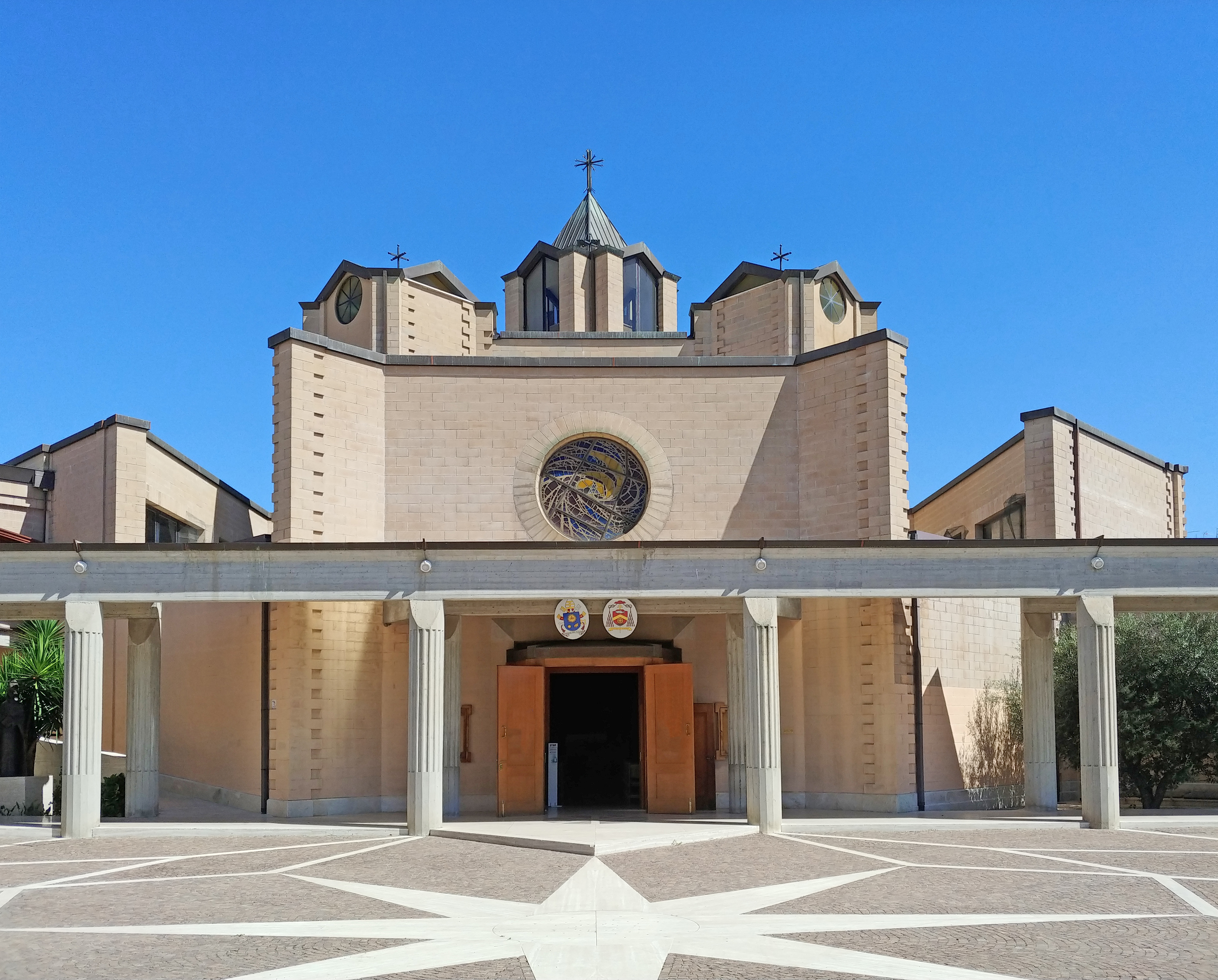
- Facade
- Click on the map for a fullscreen view
- 41°57′52″N 12°32′04″E
- Location: Via delle Vigne Nuove 653, Rome
- Country: Italy
- Denomination: Roman Catholic
- Tradition: Latin Church
- Website: Official Website

History
- Status: Titular church
- Dedication: Albertus Magnus

Architecture
- Architect: Sandro Benedetti
- Architectural type: Church
- Style: Modern
- Completed: 1981

Administration
- District: Lazio
- Province: Rome

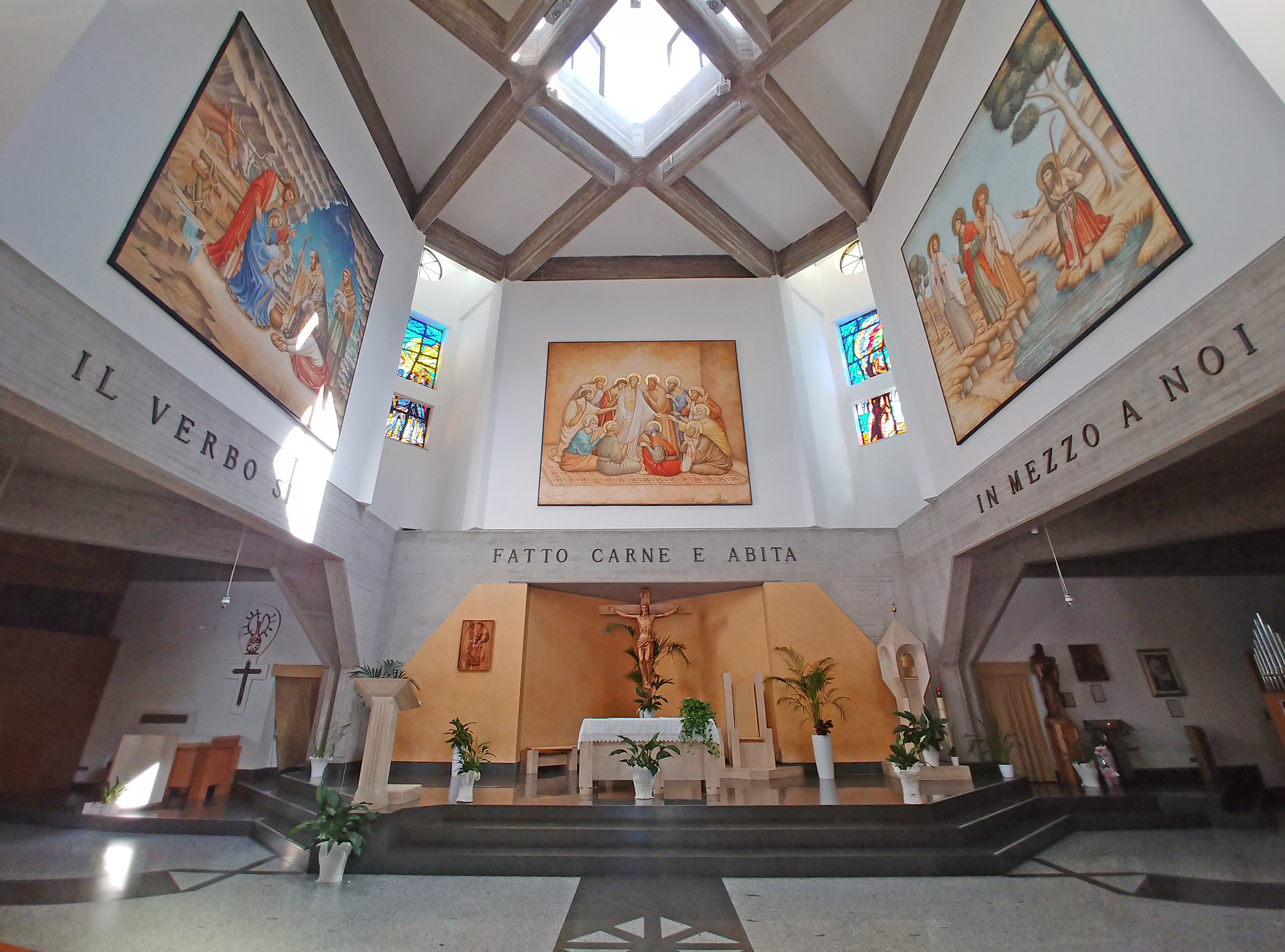
Interior

Sant'Alberto Magno is a church in Rome, in Via delle Vigne Nuove in Rome Municipio III, dedicated to Saint Albertus Magnus (c. 1200–1280). The church is the seat of the title of "Sant'Alberto Magno", established 19 November 2016 by Pope Francis.

== Cardinal Priest ==
Pope Francis established it as titular church on 19 November 2016.

- Anthony Soter Fernandez (19 November 2016 – 28 October 2020)
- Virgílio do Carmo da Silva (27 August 2022 – present)
