= Julian Leow Beng Kim =

Malaysian archbishop

The Most Reverend Julian Leow Beng Kim
- Archbishop of Kuala Lumpur; President of the Catholic Bishops' Conference of Malaysia, Singapore and Brunei
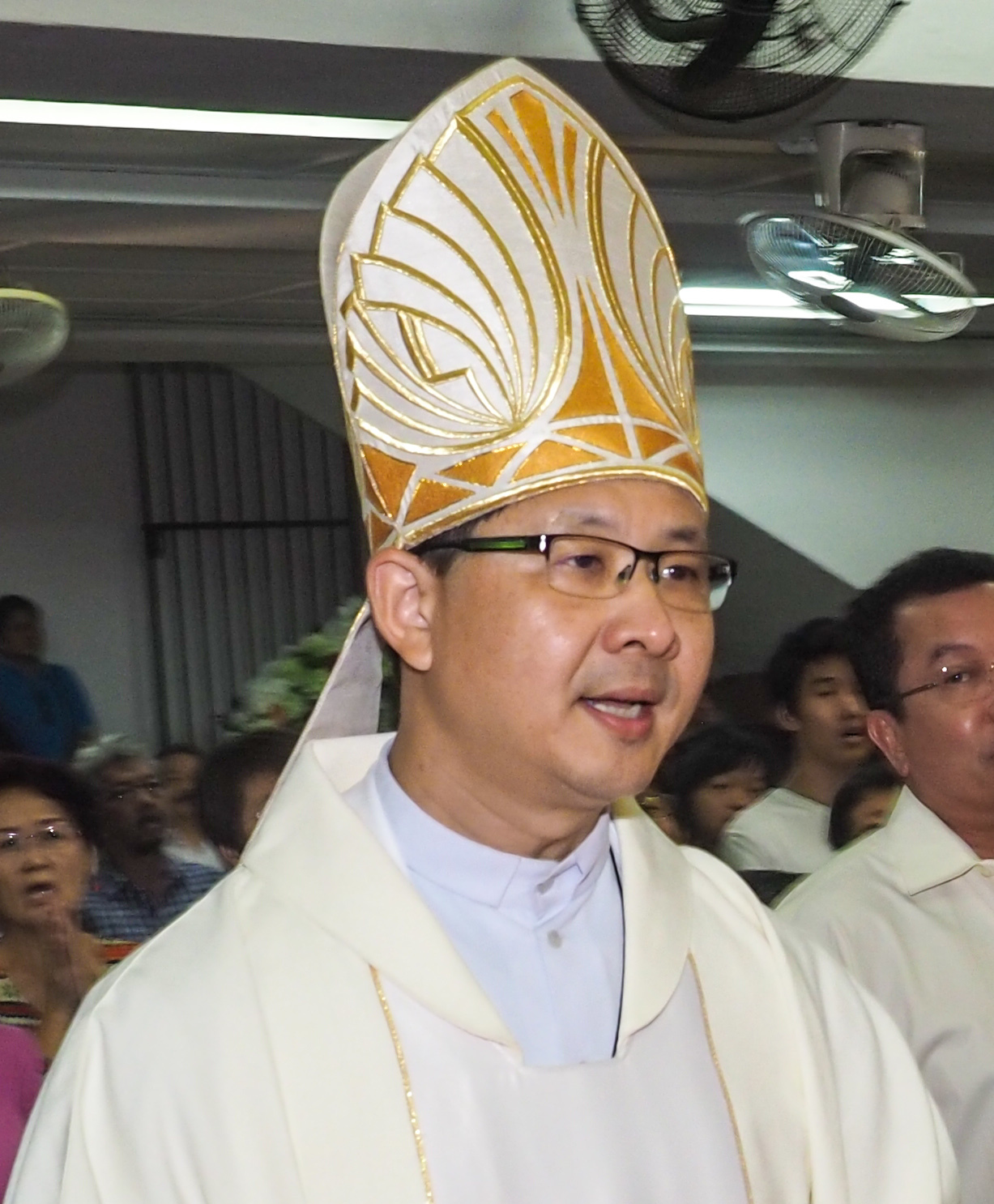
- Leow in 2017
- Church: Catholic Church
- Archdiocese: Kuala Lumpur
- Appointed: 3 July 2014
- Installed: 6 October 2014
- Predecessor: Murphy Pakiam

Orders
- Ordination: 20 April 2002 by Anthony Soter Fernandez
- Consecration: 6 October 2014 by John Ha Tiong Hock

Personal details
- Born: 3 January 1964 (age 62) Seremban, Negeri Sembilan, Malaysia
- Education: University of New South Wales; College General; Pontifical Gregorian University
- Motto: Integrity and Tenderness
- Coat of arms

Styles of Julian Leow Beng Kim
- Reference style: His Most Reverend
- Spoken style: Your Most Reverend
- Religious style: Archbishop

Julian Leow Beng Kim
- Traditional Chinese: 廖炳堅
- Hanyu Pinyin: Liào Bǐngjiān
- Jyutping: Liu6 Bing2 Gin1
- Hokkien POJ: Liāu Péng-kian
- Tâi-lô: Liāu Píng-kian

Julian Leow Beng Kim (born 3 January 1964) is a Malaysian prelate of the Catholic Church who has been serving as archbishop of the Archdiocese of Kuala Lumpur since 2014. He also serves as president of the Catholic Bishops' Conference of Malaysia, Singapore and Brunei.

== Early life ==
Julian Leow Beng Kim was born on 3 January 1964 in Seremban, Negeri Sembilan, into an ethnic Malaysian Chinese family of Cantonese descent. He pursued his undergraduate studies in Australia and graduated with a Bachelor of Building from the University of New South Wales, Sydney, in 1989.

Responding to a call to the priesthood, he entered College General in Penang in 1994, where he undertook his ecclesiastical studies until 2001. On 20 April 2002, he was ordained a priest for the Archdiocese of Kuala Lumpur by Archbishop Anthony Soter Fernandez (now Cardinal).

Leow furthered his theological education in Rome, obtaining a Licentiate in Church History from the Pontifical Gregorian University. Upon returning to Malaysia, he served at College General as Dean of Studies and Formator from 2009 until his appointment as archbishop.

== Appointment as archbishop ==
On 3 July 2014, Pope Francis appointed Leow as the 4th archbishop of Kuala Lumpur. He succeeds Archbishop Emeritus Murphy Pakiam, whose resignation was accepted by the Pope on 13 December 2013 upon the reaching the age limit of 75 according to the Canon Law.

Leow was consecrated and installed archbishop on 6 October 2014, in the presence of the Apostolic Nuncio to Malaysia, Archbishop Joseph Marino at the Church of the Holy Family in Kajang, Selangor. Some 12,000 came from around the country to witness the consecration. His principal consecrator was the Archbishop of Kuching, Most Rev. Dato' John Ha Tiong Hock. His co-consecrators were Archbishop Emeritus Murphy Pakiam and Cardinal Anthony Soter Fernandez.

The motto for Leow's episcopacy is "Integrity and Tenderness".

Controversy erupted on the day of Leow's ordination to the episcopacy regarding the inclusion of a 'tree of all religions' in his episcopal coat of arms. An article published by conservative Roman Catholic news portal Rorate Caeli reported that a local group of Catholic faithful had been deeply scandalized by the symbol, which could be suggestive of the heresy of indifferentism.

== See also ==
- Archdiocese of Kuala Lumpur
- College General

Catholic Church titles
Preceded by Murphy Pakiam	Archbishop of Kuala Lumpur; 2014–present	Incumbent
