= Santa Maria Causa Nostrae Laetitiae =

- Church of Saint Mary, Cause of Our Joy
- Parrocchia Santa Maria Causa Nostrae Laetitiae
- Location within Rome
- 41°51′37″N 12°38′34″E
- Location: Piazza Siderea 1, Torre Gaia, Rome
- Country: Italy
- Language(s): Italian and Romanian
- Denomination: Catholic
- Tradition: Roman Rite
- Website: santamariacnl.it

History
- Status: titular church, parish church
- Dedication: Mary, mother of Jesus
- Consecrated: 1941

Architecture
- Functional status: active
- Architect: Tullio Rossi
- Architectural type: Rococo
- Years built: 1939–41

Administration
- Diocese: Rome

Santa Maria Causa Nostrae Laetitiae is a 20th-century parochial church and titular church on the eastern edge of Rome. It is dedicated to the Virgin Mary, with the phrase causa nostræ lætitæ ("cause of our joy") being taken from the Litany of Loreto.

== History ==
The church was built in 1939–41 in a Rococo style, to serve the workers at the Villaggio Breda weapons plant.

The historian Jean Coste was a priest at the church.

On 30 September 2023, Pope Francis made it a titular church to be held by a cardinal-priest.

Cardinal-protectors

- Sebastian Francis (2023–present)
