= St. John's Cathedral (Kuala Lumpur) =

Cathedral of St. John The Evangelist
- Malay: Katedral St John Penginjil; Chinese: 圣若望主教座堂
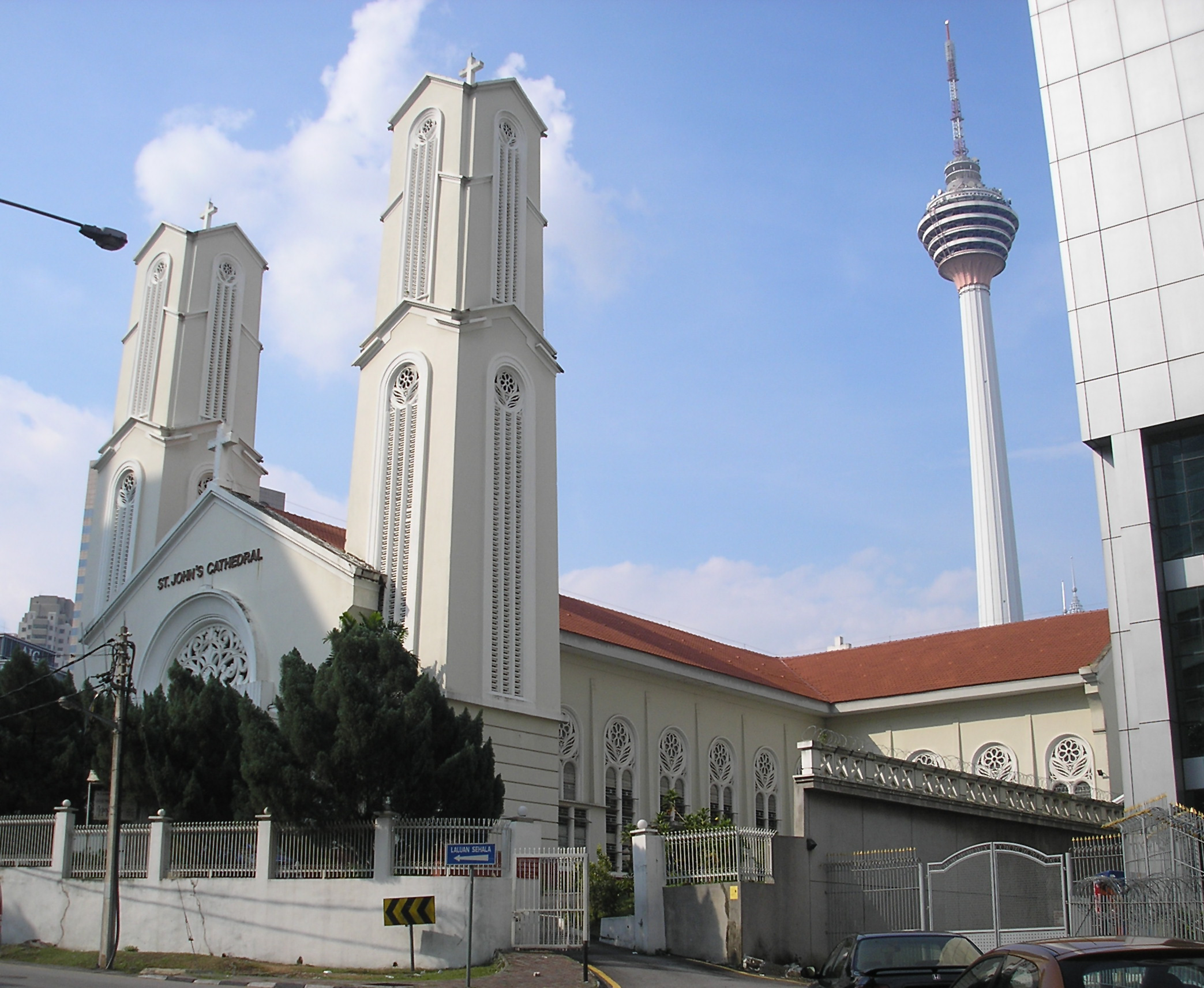
- The cathedral as seen facing northeast, the Kuala Lumpur Tower is seen in the background
- Cathedral of St. John The Evangelist
- Location: 5 Jalan Bukit Nanas; Kuala Lumpur
- Country: Malaysia
- Denomination: Roman Catholic

History
- Status: Cathedral

Architecture
- Functional status: Active
- Style: Grecian-Spanish
- Completed: 1883 (original building); 1955 (renovation)

Administration
- Province: Kuala Lumpur
- Diocese: Kuala Lumpur

Clergy
- Archbishop: Most Rev. Julian Leow Beng Kim
- Priest: Fr. Gerard Theraviam

Cathedral of St John The Evangelist is the mother church of the Roman Catholic Archdiocese of Kuala Lumpur and the seat of its Archbishop, Julian Leow Beng Kim. The first church on a nearby site was established in 1883, and consisted of a long wooden hall with a few windows built on a forested area of Bukit Nanas, and was dedicated to St John the Evangelist. It was later rebuilt with bricks walls and tile roofed, and today is used as "The Community Services Centre". It has however been converted into the Archdiocese of Kuala Lumpur Museum which will commence operations in 2025 and is currently undergoing restoration of its original stained glass windows and high altar.

The current building was built in 1954 and completed in 1955 and consecrated in 1962, when it was also elevated to the status of cathedral. The building is known for its whitewashed exterior and twin spires at the west front. It also includes stained glass windows from Paris, depicting scenes from the Gospel featuring the apostle John.

The parish a 'cosmopolitan' parish. Situated in the heart of the Kuala Lumpur, the cathedral also draws many foreign visitors and diplomats, apart from the regular parishioners, to its Sunday services.

St John's Cathedral is located next to St. John's Institution, which is known for its Grecian-Spanish architecture. The school derives its name from St John Baptist De La Salle and was established by the Lasallian Brothers.

Due to its location ascending Bukit Nanas, it is also in close proximity to Convent Bukit Nanas, Bukit Nanas Forest Reserve and Kuala Lumpur Tower.

== 2023 ceiling collapse ==
On 10 February 2023, around 2:30pm, a part of the ceiling collapsed on one side of the cathedral.

Upon inspection, the affected area was a victim of termite infestation. Because of the collapse, there were some damages to the altar area and a few pews.

Parish Priest Rev. Father Gerard Theraviam announced that masses would be suspended at the cathedral and would transfer to Convent Bukit Nanas chapel until further notice.

The cathedral building was closed to the public until works are completed in 2023 and reopened for Christmas the same year.

== Transportation ==
It is accessible from the Masjid Jamek LRT station and the Bukit Nanas Monorail station.

== See also ==
- Christianity in Malaysia
