= Archdiocese of Kuala Lumpur =

Latin Catholic archdiocese in Malaysia

Archdiocese of Kuala Lumpur Archidioecesis Kuala Lumpurensis Keuskupan Agung Kuala Lumpur கோலாலம்பூர் மறைமாவட்டம் 吉隆坡总教区

Catholic
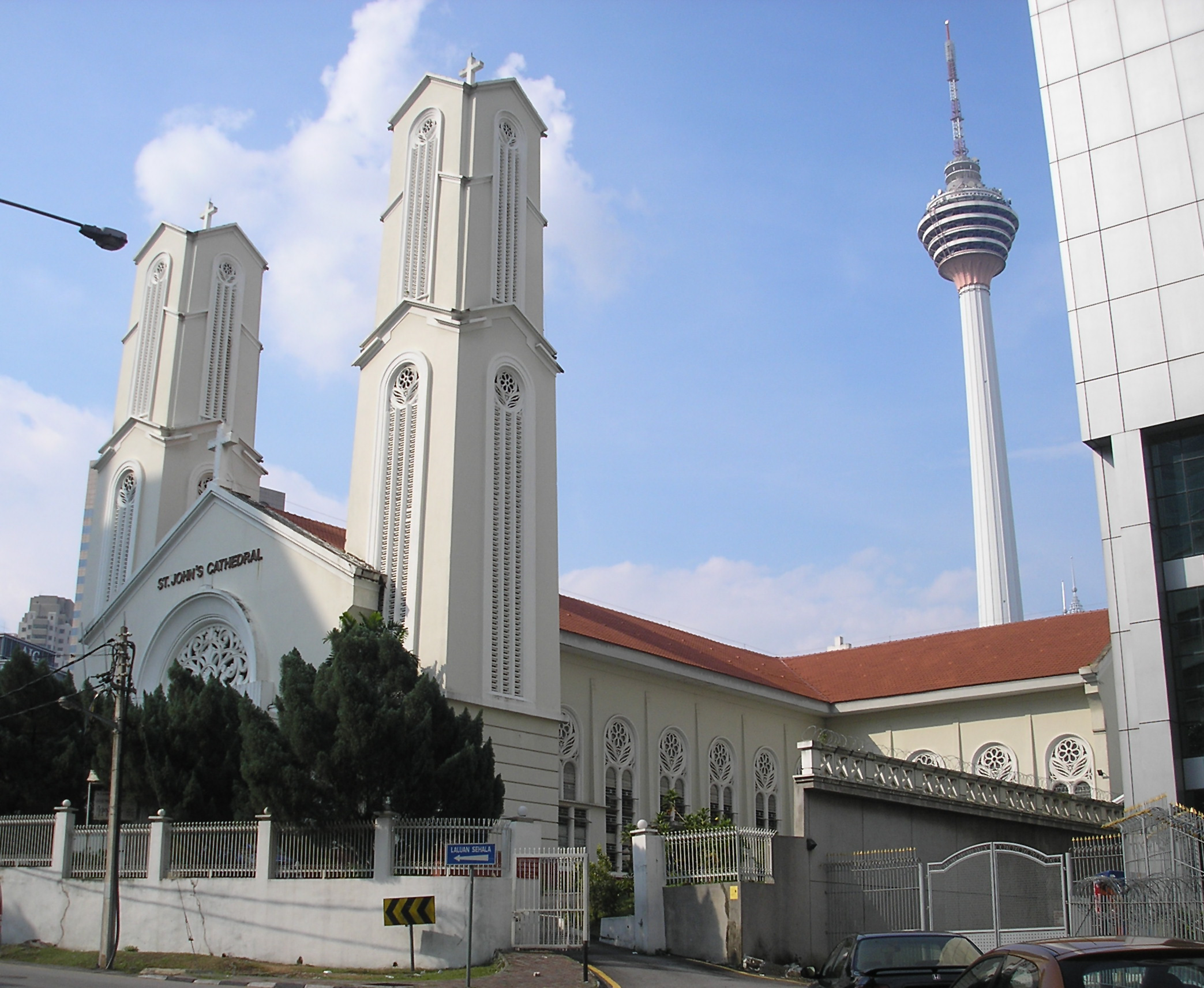
- St. John's Cathedral

- Coat of arms

Location
- Country: Malaysia
- Territory: Kuala Lumpur, Selangor, Negeri Sembilan, Pahang and Terengganu
- Episcopal conference: Catholic Bishops' Conference of Malaysia, Singapore and Brunei
- Ecclesiastical province: Kuala Lumpur
- Coordinates: 3°09′04″N 101°42′03″E

Statistics
- Area: 63,763 km^{2} (24,619 sq mi)
- Population: Total; Catholics: (as of 2019); 12,390,830; 264,840 (2.1%)
- Parishes: 35

Information
- Denomination: Catholic Church
- Rite: Roman Rite
- Established: February 25, 1955; 71 years ago
- Cathedral: St. John's Cathedral
- Patron saint: John the Evangelist
- Secular priests: 61

Current leadership
- Pope: Leo XIV
- Metropolitan Archbishop: Julian Leow Beng Kim
- Suffragans: Diocese of Penang; Diocese of Malacca-Johor
- Vicar General: Msgr Patrick Boudville (Vicar General 1); Msgr Stanislaus Soosaimariam (Vicar General 2); Rev.Fr.Dr. Clarence Devadass (Chancellor)
- Episcopal Vicars: Msgr James Gnanapiragasam; Msgr Daniel Lim
- Bishops emeritus: Murphy Pakiam

Website
- www.archkl.org

The Metropolitan Archdiocese of Kuala Lumpur (Latin: Archidioecesis Kuala Lumpurensis; Malay: Keuskupan Agung Kuala Lumpur; Tamil: கோலாலம்பூர் மறைமாவட்டம்; Mandarin: 吉隆坡总教区), shortened as Archkl, is an ecclesiastical territory or diocese of the Catholic Church in Malaysia. It was erected as the Diocese of Kuala Lumpur by Pope Pius XII on 25 February 1955, and was elevated to the rank of a Metropolitan Archdiocese on 18 December 1972, with the suffragan sees of Malacca-Johor and Penang. It also administers the capital city of Malaysia, Federal Territory of Kuala Lumpur as well as the federal administrative centre of Putrajaya and the urbanised states of Selangor and Negeri Sembilan in the central region as well as Pahang and Terengganu on the East Coast. The archdiocese's Mother Church and thus, seat of its Archbishop, is St. John's Cathedral. It is one of the three Roman Catholic archdioceses in Malaysia, with the ecclesiastical archdioceses of Kota Kinabalu and Kuching, both at the Borneo Islands.

== History ==
In 1786, the first church was established in Penang. This led to the formation of Vicariate of Siam and Kedah, which expanded towards the entire Malayan Peninsula and Singapore. The Vicariate of Malaya was formed in 1841. The Church of Visitation was founded in 1848 in Seremban, Negeri Sembilan. This is the first known church to be erected in central Malaya. A historical moment was made in 1888, when the Diocese of Malacca was formed. The first church in Kuala Lumpur was dedicated to St John the evangelist in 1883, and would be later known as St. John's Cathedral, the Mother Church of Kuala Lumpur.

In 1955, the Diocese of Malacca became a Metropolitan Archdiocese, with the newly formed Diocese of Penang and Diocese of Kuala Lumpur as its suffragan sees. Bishop Dominic Vendargon was appointed as the first Bishop of Kuala Lumpur, and was ordained in the same year. In 1972, the Diocese of Kuala Lumpur was elevated into an Archdiocese, with the suffragan dioceses of Penang and Malacca-Johor.

In 1983, Archbishop Dominic Vendargon retired. Bishop Anthony Soter Fernandez of Penang was appointed as the 2nd Archbishop of Kuala Lumpur. When he retired in 2003, he was succeeded by Archbishop Murphy Pakiam who was then the Auxiliary Bishop. On 3 July 2014, the Vatican appointed Most Rev Julian Leow as the 4th Archbishop of Kuala Lumpur, after the resignation of Archbishop Emeritus Murphy Pakiam was accepted by Pope Francis in December 2013. This ending the 59 years of the ethnic Indian domination of the diocese's hierarchy with the election of Leow, an ethnic Chinese. During the consistory on 19 November 2016, Pope Francis installed Archbishop Emeritus Anthony Soter Fernandez as a cardinal, making him the first bishop from Malaysia to be appointed.

== Statistical summary ==
Below are statistics of the archdiocese.

- Area of territory - 63,763 km^{2}
- Approximate total population - 10,421,600
- Estimate Catholic population - 134,000
- Churches - 36
- Chapels & Mass Centres - 49
- Clergy - Bishops: 2, Diocesan Priests: 41, Religious Priests: 18, Deacon: 1
- Religious Sisters - 102
- Religious Brothers - 17
- Educational Institutions - Nursing College: 1, Secondary Schools: 15, Primary Schools: 32, Kindergartens: 21
- Charitable and Social Institutions - Hospital: 1, Home of Aged: 2, Counselling Centres: 3

== Bishops ==
The following are the lists of ordinaries (bishops of the diocese) and auxiliary bishops, and their terms of service.

=== Bishop of Kuala Lumpur ===
No.	Portrait	Name	From	Until	Insignia
1		Dominic Aloysius Vendargon (1909-2005)	1955	1972	

=== Archbishops of Kuala Lumpur ===
No.	Portrait	Name	From	Until	Insignia
1		Dominic Aloysius Vendargon (1909-2005)	1972	1983 (Resigned)	
2		Anthony Soter Fernandez (1932-2020)	1983	2003 (Resigned)	
3		Murphy Nicholas Xavier Pakiam (born 1938)	2003	2013 (Resigned)	
4		Julian Leow Beng Kim (born 1964)	2014	Present	

=== Former Auxiliary Bishops of Kuala Lumpur and Other Priests of This Diocese Who Became Bishop ===
- Antony Selvanayagam (1980–1983), appointed Bishop of Penang
- Murphy Nicholas Xavier Pakiam (1995–2003), appointed Archbishop of this diocese

== Religious societies ==
- (Italy) De La Salle Brothers (FSC)
- (France) Montfort Brothers of St. Gabriel (SG)
- (China) Congregation of the Disciples of the Lord (CDD)
- (Italy) Marist Brothers (FMS)
- (Italy) Order of Friars Minor Capuchin (OFM Cap)
- (Italy) Jesuits (SJ)
- (France) Paris Foreign Missions Society (MEP)
- (Italy) Order of Discalced Carmelites and Carmelite Sisters (OCD)
- (Italy) Canossians (FDCC)
- (Italy) Daughters of St. Paul (FSP)
- (Italy) Franciscan Missionaries of Mary (FMM)
- (Italy) Franciscan Sisters of the Immaculate Conception (FSIC)
- (Malaysia) Sisters of St. Francis of Sarawak (SSFS)
- (Italy) Good Shepherd Sisters (RGS)
- (France) Little Sisters of the Poor (LSP)
- (France) Sisters of the Infant Jesus (IJS)

== Awards and recognition ==
- 2016 The Fisher's Net Awards - Best Diocesan Use of New Media

== See also ==
- Catholic Church in Malaysia
- List of Catholic dioceses in Malaysia, Singapore and Brunei
- List of Catholic dioceses (structured view)-Episcopal Conference of Malaysia, Singapore and Brunei
