= Don Bosco Technical High School (Timor-Leste) =

Don Bosco Technical Vocational Secondary School
- Fatumaca, Baucau Municipality; Timor-Leste

Information
- Type: Vocational secondary school
- Religious affiliation: Catholic (Salesians of Don Bosco)
- Established: 1973
- Principal: Amilcar Cabral da Silva
- Teaching staff: 16
- Grades: 10–12
- Enrolment: 300 (2021)
- Campus type: Rural

Don Bosco Technical Vocational Secondary School (Portuguese: Escola Secundária Técnica Vocacional Dom Bosco) is a three-year vocational secondary school in Fatumaca, Timor-Leste.

It was established as the Fatumaca Technical School in 1973 and offered two courses: carpentry and mechanics. The school is a privately managed by the Salesians of Don Bosco.

In March 1981 Father Carlos Filipe Ximenes Belo became the director of the school, where he further developed the program of modern technological education during his two-year tenure.

In 1985, the Fatumaca Technical School became known as STM (Sekolah Teknologi Menengah) where it enjoyed the same level as Senior Secondary School. According to the needs to the country, the school introduced two new courses: electrics and electronics. Initially the school accepted only male students from all the districts and follows the curriculum of the Ministry of Education.

All the courses run for 3 years and is divided into 3 semesters per year. The school has 4 practical workshops, fully equipped enabling students do undertake practical work. Currently, there are 16 trainers.

Around 65 percent of the graduates work in government organisations, 25 percent in universities and 10 percent are employed in private companies. Father Andreas Colleja was the director of Don Bosco Technical High School in 1994. The school now has 300 students enrolled in machinery, construction and electrical engineering classes.

All students live in a boarding house and help support the school by growing corn, rice and vegetables and raising pigs, chickens and buffalo. Cultivating 100 hectares with 10 tractors, students feed themselves, school workers, staff and 150 children at a nearby orphanage.

The school is known and respected in the area of Timor-Leste, but has staffing issues due to the remote nature and currently Salesian priests and brothers handle all the instruction.

Getting laboratory tools and materials in Timor-Leste is another difficulty. Despite its difficulties, the school has big plans, including building model water pumping stations, a drinking water pump using bio-gas from animal wastes, and another using electricity generated from solar power.

The school also plans a health clinic, radio station and computer courses in the near future.

Brother Marcal Amaral Lopes was the headmaster of Don Bosco Technical High School in 2000.

In 2014 Brother Adriano de Jesus was principal.

Archbishop of Dili Cardinal Virgílio do Carmo da Silva has also served as a director of the school.

In 2017, 11 percent of the students were girls.

In 2023 the school had a functioning FM radio and television stations. These are used to provide students with broadcasting and related operations experience.
