= Antony Selvanayagam =

Roman Catholic bishop

His Excellency Antony Selvanayagam
- Bishop Emeritus of Penang
- See: Diocese of Penang
- Installed: 8 November 1983
- Term ended: 7 July 2012
- Predecessor: Anthony Soter Fernandez
- Successor: Sebastian Francis
- Other post: Auxiliary Bishop of Kuala Lumpur

Orders
- Ordination: 20 December 1969
- Consecration: 1 September 1980

Personal details
- Born: 24 October 1935 (age 90) Bentong, Pahang, British Malaya
- Denomination: Roman Catholic
- Residence: George Town, Penang

Antony Selvanayagam is the Bishop Emeritus of the Diocese of Penang, Malaysia. He was elected by Pope John Paul II as the 4th bishop of Penang after the transfer of his predecessor, Bishop Anthony Soter Fernandez to the Archdiocese of Kuala Lumpur as the 2nd archbishop of Kuala Lumpur. From 1980 to 1983, he was an auxiliary bishop in the Archdiocese of Kuala Lumpur, holding the titular see of Giru Mons. He retired in 2012 due to old age, and was succeeded by Msgr. Sebastian Francis as the new Bishop of Penang. He has served as head of the church's Commission for Ecumenism and Interreligious Affairs.

== See also ==
- Archdiocese of Kuala Lumpur
- Diocese of Penang

Catholic Church titles
Preceded by Anthony Soter Fernandez	4th Catholic Bishop of Penang; 1983–2012	Succeeded by Sebastian Francis
