= Herald Malaysia =

Malaysian weekly Catholic newspaper

Herald, The Catholic Weekly
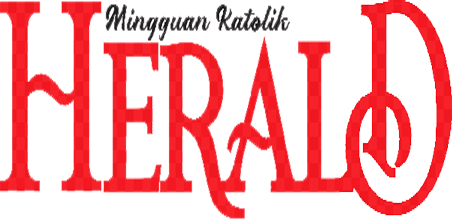
- Official logo
- Type: Weekly newspaper
- Format: Compact
- Owner(s): The Titual Archbishop of Kuala Lumpur, on behalf of the Catholic Bishops of Peninsular Malaysia
- Editor: Father Lawrence Andrew, SJ
- Founded: 8 September 1994
- Headquarters: Archdiocesan Pastoral Centre, 5 Robertson Road, 50150 Kuala Lumpur
- Circulation: 15,600
- Price: MYR1.00
- Website: www.heraldmalaysia.com

Herald Malaysia is a multilingual Malaysian Catholic weekly newspaper. It publishes in English with additional language sections inside in Chinese, Tamil and Malaysian languages.

== Circulation ==
It has a circulation of 15,600 copies in Malaysia. It is printed in English, Malay, Tamil and Chinese, and meant for distribution to Malaysian Catholics.

== Newspaper sections ==
Montage of the Herald, which is published in English with sections in Chinese, Tamil and Malaysian language.

- Cover News
- Forum & Reflection
- Home News
- International News
- Editorial
- Opinion
- Focus
- Focus: Faith Alive
- Focus: Children
- Focus: Youth
- Chinese
- Bahasa Malaysia
- Weekly reading
- Supplements
- Today's Shalom

== Government threats and censorship ==
The Herald newspaper nearly lost its publishing licence for using the word "Allah" as a translation for "God," with authorities saying it should only be used by Muslims. The weekly was warned not to print "Allah" in the future, but instead it mounted an ongoing legal challenge to revoke the ban on the word, which is also used in the Malay-language Bible.

== See also ==
- Religious freedom in Malaysia
- Roman Catholicism in Malaysia
