= Anthony Soter Fernandez =

Malaysian Catholic archbishop (1932–2020)

His Eminence Anthony Soter Fernandez
- Cardinal and Archbishop Emeritus of Kuala Lumpur
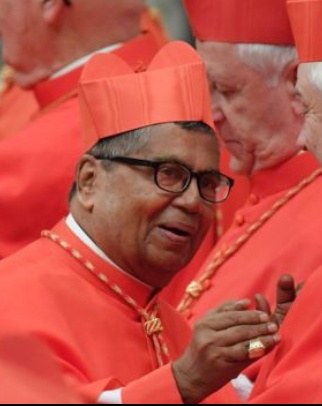
- Fernandez in 2016
- Church: Roman Catholic Church
- Diocese: Archdiocese of Kuala Lumpur
- Installed: 10 November 1983
- Term ended: 24 May 2003
- Predecessor: Dominic Vendargon
- Successor: Murphy Nicholas Xavier Pakiam
- Other post: Cardinal-Priest of Sant'Alberto Magno
- Previous post: Bishop of Penang (1977–1983)

Orders
- Ordination: 10 December 1966
- Consecration: 17 February 1978 by Gregory Yong, Chan Soon Cheong, and Lee Kok Hin
- Created cardinal: 19 November 2016 by Pope Francis
- Rank: Cardinal-Priest

Personal details
- Born: 22 April 1932 Sungai Petani, Kedah, Unfederated Malay States
- Died: 28 October 2020 (aged 88) Kuala Lumpur, Malaysia
- Buried: St. John's Cathedral, Kuala Lumpur, Malaysia
- Denomination: Catholic Church
- Motto: Keadilan dan Keamanan (Justice and Peace)
- Coat of arms: Anthony Soter Fernandez's coat of arms

Ordination history of Anthony Soter Fernandez
History
Priestly ordination
- Date: 29 July 1973
Episcopal consecration
- Principal consecrator: Gregory Yong
- Co-consecrators: James Chan Soon Cheong; Anthony Lee Kok Hin
- Date: 17 February 1978
Cardinalate
- Elevated by: Pope Francis
- Date: 19 November 2016
Episcopal succession
Bishops consecrated by Anthony Soter Fernandez as principal consecrator
- Murphy Nicholas Xavier Pakiam: 4 Oct 1995

Styles of Anthony Soter Fernandez
- Reference style: His Eminence
- Spoken style: Your Eminence
- Religious style: Cardinal
- Informal style: Cardinal

Anthony Soter Fernandez (22 April 1932 – 28 October 2020) was a Malaysian prelate of the Catholic Church who was the first Malaysian cardinal. He was Archbishop of Kuala Lumpur from 1983 to 2003.

== Biography ==
Anthony Soter Fernandez was born on 22 April 1932 in Sungai Petani, Kedah, Malaysia. He was ordained as a priest of the Diocese of Penang on 10 December 1966.

He was named Bishop of Penang on 29 September 1977. He received his episcopal consecration on 17 February 1978 from Gregory Yong, Archbishop of Singapore.

Pope John Paul II appointed him the second Archbishop of Kuala Lumpur on 30 July 1983 and he was installed there on 10 November 1983.

He served as president of the Catholic Bishops' Conference of Malaysia, Singapore and Brunei from 1987–1990 and 2000–2003.

Pope John Paul accepted his resignation as archbishop on 24 May 2003.

Fernandez was created a cardinal by Pope Francis in the consistory on 19 November 2016, and was the first Malaysian to be made a cardinal.

Fernandez died on 28 October 2020 at the Little Sisters of the Poor St. Francis Xavier Home in Cheras. He had been suffering from tongue cancer for several years. He was buried in the nave of St. John's Cathedral, Kuala Lumpur.

Catholic Church titles
| Preceded by Gregory Yong Sooi Ngean | 3rd Catholic Bishop of Penang; 1977–1983 | Succeeded by Antony Selvanayagam |
| Preceded by Dominic Vendargon | 2nd Catholic Archbishop of Kuala Lumpur; 1983–2003 | Succeeded by Murphy Nicholas Xavier Pakiam |
| Preceded by titular church established | Cardinal Priest of Sant'Alberto Magno; 2016–2020 | Succeeded by Virgílio do Carmo da Silva |
