= Diocese of Penang =

Latin Catholic diocese in Malaysia

Diocese of Penang Dioecesis Pinangensis Keuskupan Pulau Pinang பினாங்கு மறைமாவட்டம் 天主教檳城教區

Catholic
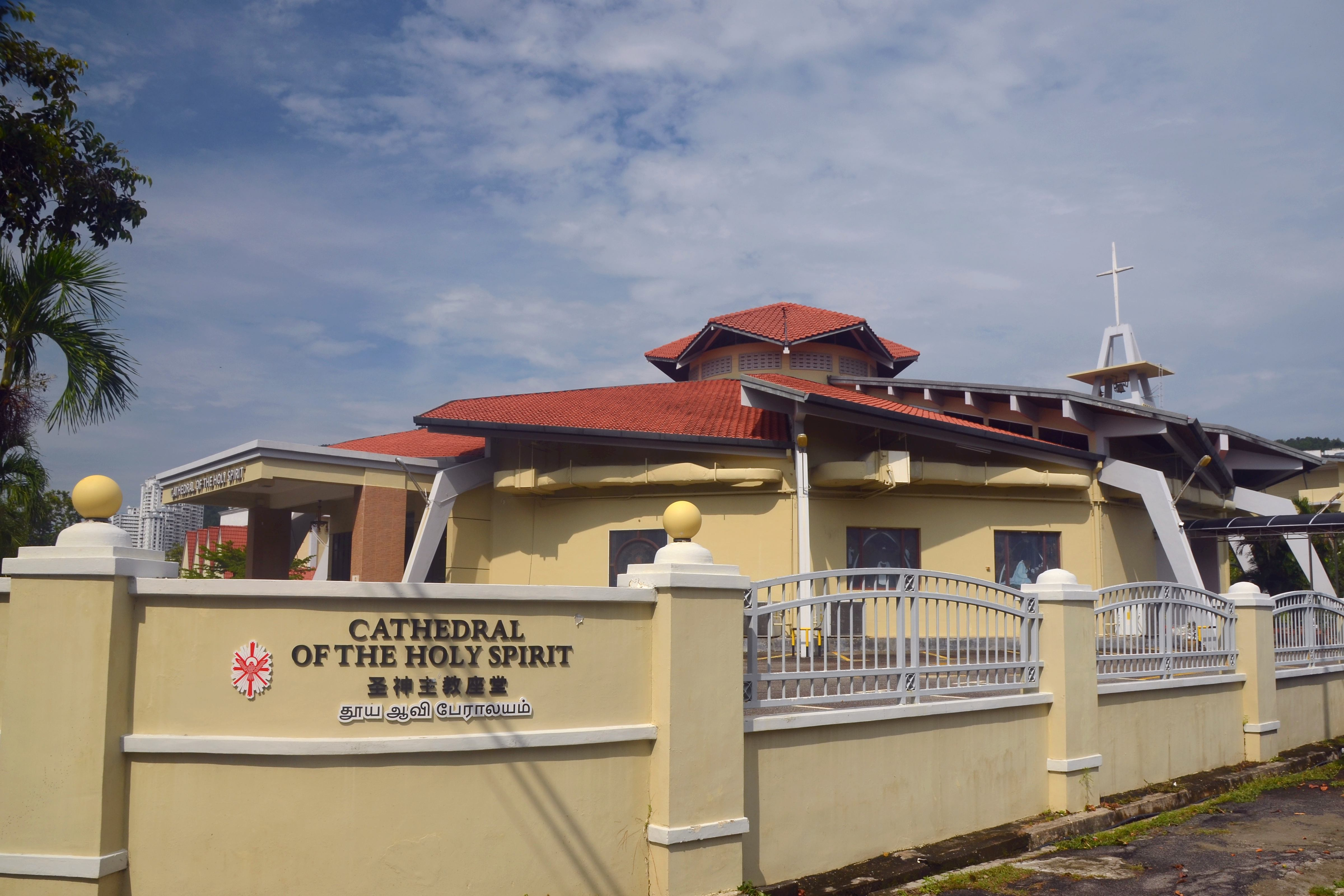
- Cathedral of the Holy Spirit in May 2022

- Coat of arms

Location
- Country: Malaysia
- Territory: Penang; Kedah; Perak; Perlis; Kelantan
- Episcopal conference: Catholic Bishops' Conference of Malaysia, Singapore and Brunei
- Ecclesiastical province: Kuala Lumpur
- Metropolitan: Kuala Lumpur
- Coordinates: 5.3939°N 100.3020°E

Statistics
- Area: 46,855 km^{2} (18,091 sq mi)
- Population: Total; Catholics: (as of 2010); 5,740,000; 65,000 (1.1%)

Information
- Denomination: Catholic Church
- Sui iuris church: Latin Church
- Rite: Roman Rite
- Established: 25 February 1955
- Cathedral: Holy Spirit Cathedral, Island Park, Green Lane, Gelugor, Penang

Current leadership
- Pope: Leo XIV
- Bishop: Sebastian Francis
- Metropolitan Archbishop: Julian Leow Beng Kim
- Vicar General: Henry Rajoo; Stephen Liew; Jude Miranda
- Bishops emeritus: Antony Selvanayagam

Website
- www.pgdiocese.org

The Diocese of Penang (Latin: Dioecesis Pinangensis; Malay: Keuskupan Pulau Pinang; Tamil: பினாங்கு மறைமாவட்டம்; Mandarin: 天主教檳城教區) is situated in the northern as well as the east coast region of Peninsular Malaysia covering 4 northern states, namely Perlis, Kedah, Penang and Perak as well as the east coast state of Kelantan. It was created on 25 February 1955 together with the Archdiocese of Kuala Lumpur. It is under the ecclesiastical province of Kuala Lumpur.

== History ==
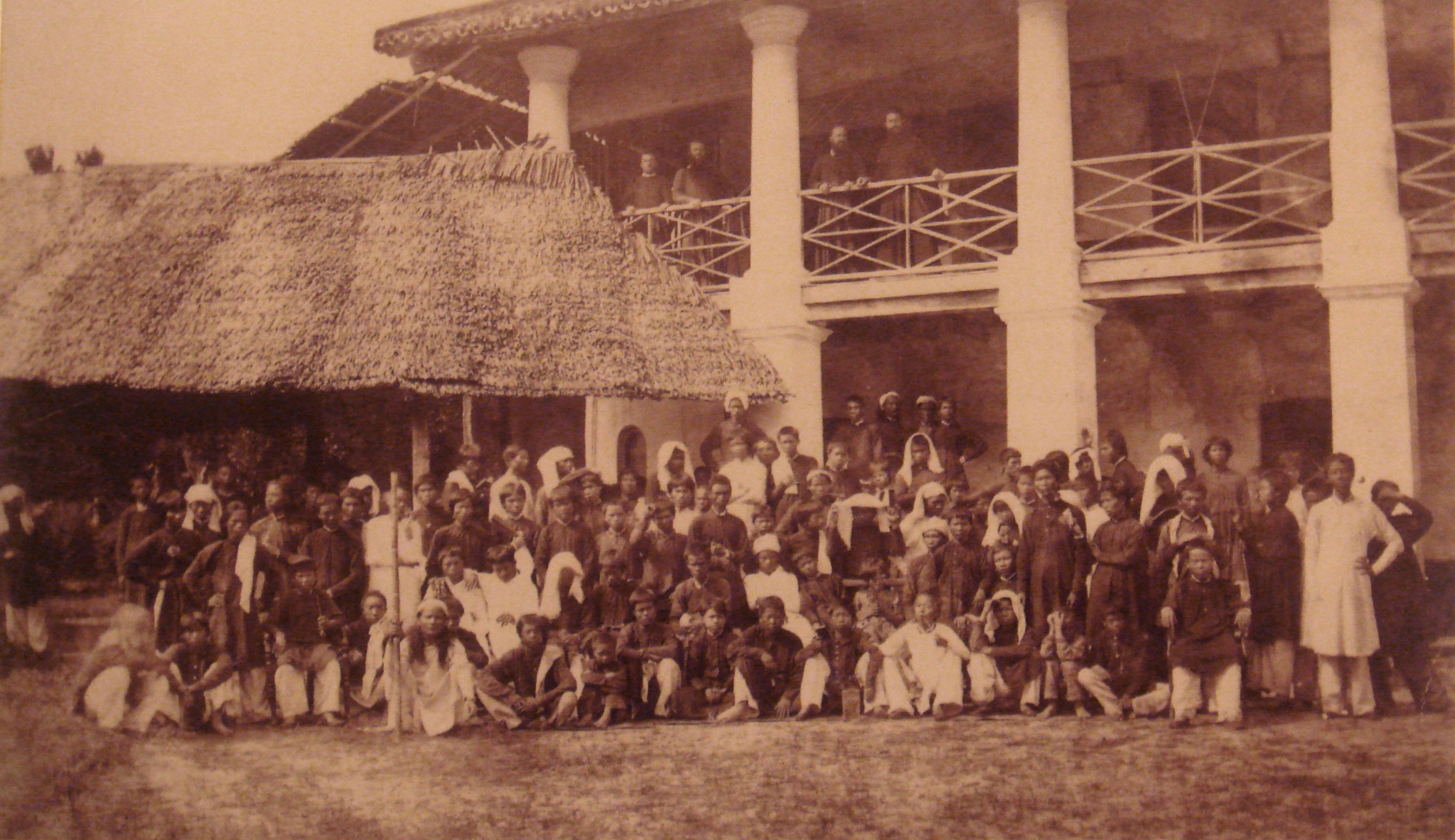
College General in 1866

The first Catholic priests settled in Malacca in the 1511. College General was established in Ayuthia, Thailand in 1665. It was moved to Cambodia before finally settling in Penang in 1808. A seminary occupied a site in Pulau Tikus before moving to their present site in Tanjung Bungah in 1984. In 1786, Captain Francis Light and his men landed in Penang and decided to build a church there. They constructed a church and it was completed in August 1787. The church was blessed on the Feast of the Assumption (15 August). That was the first church in Penang, named the Church of the Assumption. A few years, later, another priest settled in Penang and used the College General place as their church. This was the second church in Penang named Church of the Immaculate Conception. More churches were constructed.

In 1810, Msgr Garnault as parish priest of the Assumption Church assumed leadership of the Vicariate of Siam and Kedah. Penang became a part of the vicariate which expanded until Singapore. When the Vicariate of Malaya was formed in 1841, Penang became one of its districts, and subsequently went under the jurisdiction of newly formed Diocese of Malacca in 1888.

In the 1940s, World War II affected Penang. Some churches were closed all the time except for Sunday Masses. After World War II, there was a need of setting up a diocese. On 25 February 1955, the Diocese of Malacca was split into an archdiocese with 2 suffragans. The Diocese of Penang was formed together with the Archdiocese of Kuala Lumpur. In 1972, the Archdiocese of Malacca became the new Diocese of Malacca-Johor, when Singapore ceased to be the Metropolitan See. The Diocese of Kuala Lumpur was subsequently elevated, and it became the Metropolitan Archdiocese of Penang and Malacca-Johor until today.

Bishop Francis Chan and Archbishop Dominic Vendargon were the first Malaysian bishops to be ordained. Bishop Francis Chan was the first bishop of Penang. In 1967, due to the demise of Bishop Francis Chan, Bishop Gregory Yong was appointed as the second bishop of Penang. In 1976, Penang hosted the Aggiornamento for all bishops and priests in West Malaysia. In 1977, he was appointed as Archbishop of Singapore. Bishop Anthony Soter Fernandez was ordained and became the third bishop of the diocese. However, in 1983, he was appointed as archbishop of the archdiocese in Kuala Lumpur.

Bishop Antony Selvanayagam then became the fourth bishop of Penang in 1983, he was previously ordained in 1980 and was formerly the auxiliary bishop of Kuala Lumpur. He retired in 2012. On 7 July 2012, the Vatican appointed Rt. Rev Sebastian Francis as the fifth bishop of Penang. He was ordained on 20 August 2012, at St. Anne's Church in Bukit Mertajam, Penang, and installed in September 2012 at the Holy Spirit Cathedral in Gelugor.

In the 1970s, the administration of College General, Peninsular Malaysia's sole Catholic seminary, was handed over to the local clergy. In the 1990s, there were 34 parishes in the diocese. The number of priests have been shrinking, so Bishop Antony made a decision that the four churches located in George Town, Penang were to be emerged as one parish to be called City Parish. Likewise in Perak, the two churches located in Taiping also emerged as one parish as the Taiping Catholic Church. The number of parishes was therefore reduced slightly to 28.

In 2001, the main administration centre of the diocese Pusat Keuskupan Katolik was opened by Bishop Antony. The following year in 2002, the third St Anne's Church, Bukit Mertajam together with the parish centre, domus and administration office, were opened on the Feast of St Anne (26 July) by the then Apostolic Delegate. Also in that year, Bishop Antony decided to remove the cathedral status of the Church of the Assumption to the now Cathedral of the Holy Spirit, after the church was no longer a parish. The Church of the Assumption had failed to meet the diocese's demands and most of the diocese's events are held outside of that church.

The Rite of Dedication for the Cathedral of the Holy Spirit was held on 20 January 2003. In 2005, the Diocese of Penang celebrated its 50th anniversary. In September 2010, the Church of Divine Mercy was opened. It is the first church opened on Penang Island after 41 years.

== Status of the diocese ==
Today, the Diocese of Penang has 29 parishes as of 2011 (1 each in Perlis and Kelantan, 3 in Kedah, 10 in Penang and 14 in Perak) and 77 chapels. The current Bishop is Rt. Rev Sebastian Francis, D.D who has served the diocese since 7 July 2012 and its vicar general is Msgr Henry Rajoo, Msgr Stephen Liew and Msgr Aloysius Tan. The seat of the bishop is located in Holy Spirit Cathedral since 20 January 2003 and the main office is Catholic Diocesan Centre (Pusat Keuskupan Katolik) located in George Town, Penang.

The oldest church is Church of the Assumption in George Town, Penang. It was built in 1786 and the latest church is Church of Divine Mercy (Christian Community Centre) located in Sungai Ara, Penang which was opened in September 2010. Peninsular Malaysia's sole Catholic seminary, College General is located in Tanjung Bungah, Penang. Among the notable feast days held in the diocese are the St. Anne's Feast held in St. Anne's Church, Bukit Mertajam, Penang. It attracts almost a million pilgrims without fail every year. The diocese also has transfer of priests every 5 years, with the latest being in October 2010.

== Statistical summary ==
Below are statistics of the diocese as of 2011 (updated as of 2022-23):

- Approximate total population – 6,800,000
- Estimate Catholic population – 65,355
- Parishes – 33
- Chapels & out-stations – 72
- Baptism – (Infants under 7): 571, Adults: 379
- Religious Sisters – 80
- Religious Brothers – 11
- Seminarians (3 Philosophy, 3 Theology)

== List of parishes in the Diocese of Penang ==
These are the list of parishes in the diocese. They are divided into 3 deaneries, namely Penang Island Deanery, Northern Region Deanery and Perak State Deanery. All parishes and their churches are listed. Chapels are not listed.

- Penang Island Deanery (6 parishes)
  - Cathedral of the Holy Spirit, Green Lane, Gelugor
  - Church of Divine Mercy (Christian Community Centre), Sungai Ara
  - City Parish, George Town
    - Church of Our Lady of Sorrows, Jalan Macalister (parish centre)
    - Church of the Assumption, Farquhar Street
    - Church of St. Francis Xavier, Penang Road
    - Church of St. John Britto, Sungai Pinang
  - Church of the Immaculate Conception, Pulau Tikus
  - Church of the Risen Christ, Air Itam
  - Church of the Holy Name of Jesus, Balik Pulau
- Northern Region Deanery (12 parishes)
  - Church of Our Lady of Fatima, Kangar, Perlis
    - Chapel of the Holy Cross, Arau, Perlis
  - Church of St Michael, Alor Star, Kedah
  - Church of Ave Stella Maris, Kuah, Langkawi, Kedah
  - Church of the Immaculate Conception, Changlun, Kubang Pasu, Kedah
  - Church of Christ The King, Sungai Petani, Kedah
  - Church of the Sacred Heart of Jesus, Kulim, Kedah
  - Church of St. Anne, Bukit Mertajam, Province Wellesley
  - Church of the Holy Name of Mary, Permatang Tinggi, Simpang Ampat, Province Wellesley
  - Church of the Nativity of the Blessed Virgin Mary, Butterworth, Province Wellesley
  - Church of Saints Chastan and Imbert, Perai, Province Wellesley
  - Church of St. Anthony, Nibong Tebal, Province Wellesley
  - Church of Our Lady of Fatima of the Holy Rosary, Kota Bharu, Kelantan
- Perak State Deanery (15 parishes)
  - Church of Our Lady of Good Health, Parit Buntar
  - Church of St. Joseph, Bagan Serai
  - Taiping Catholic Church, Taiping
    - Church of St. Louis (parish centre)
    - Church of the Immaculate Heart of Mary
  - Church of St. Patrick, Kuala Kangsar
  - Church of St. John The Baptist, Sungai Siput
  - Church of St. Michael, Greentown-Pasir Pinji, Ipoh
  - Church of Our Lady of Lourdes, Silibin, Ipoh
  - Church of Our Mother of Perpetual Help, Ipoh Garden, Ipoh
  - Church of the Sacred Heart, Kampar
  - Church of St. Joseph, Batu Gajah
  - Church of St. Francis De Sales, Sitiawan
  - Chapel of St. Anthony, Slim River
  - Church of St. Mary, Tapah
    - Chapel of St. Joseph, Bidor
  - Church of the Most Holy Redeemer, Tanjung Malim
  - Church of St. Anthony, Teluk Intan

== Gallery ==
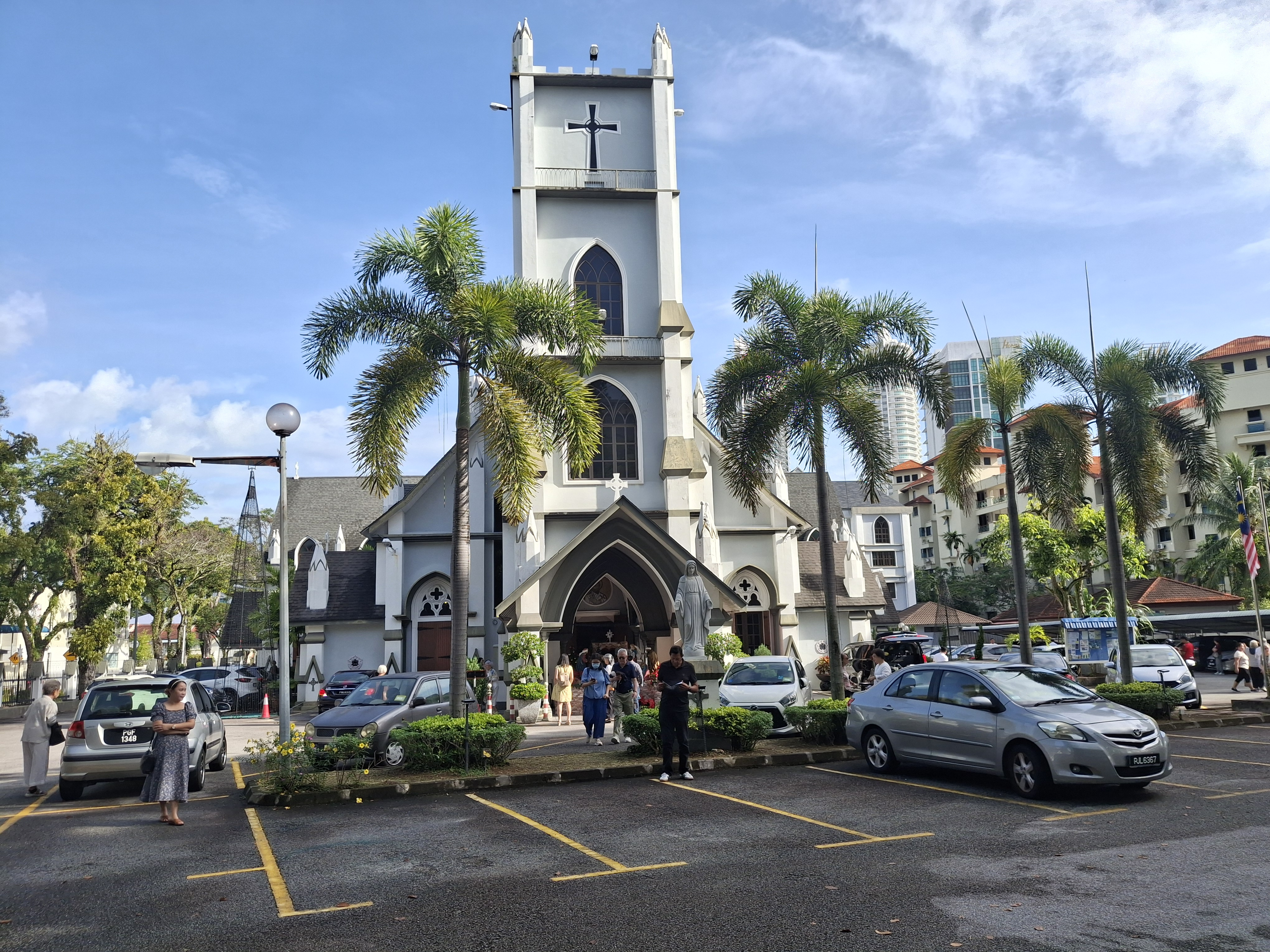
Church of Immaculate Conception, Pulau Tikus, George Town

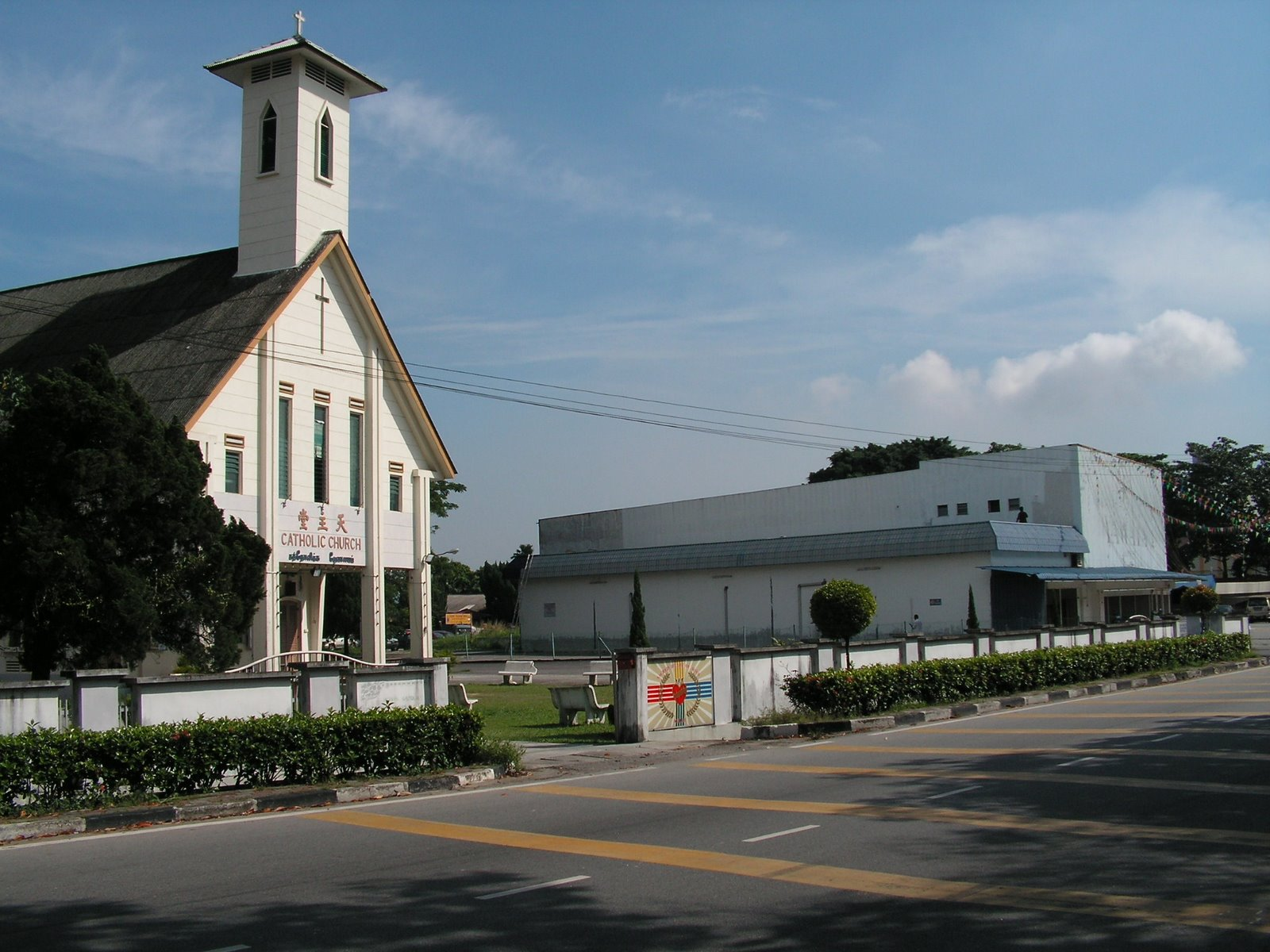
Church of the Sacred Heart of Jesus, Kulim, Kedah

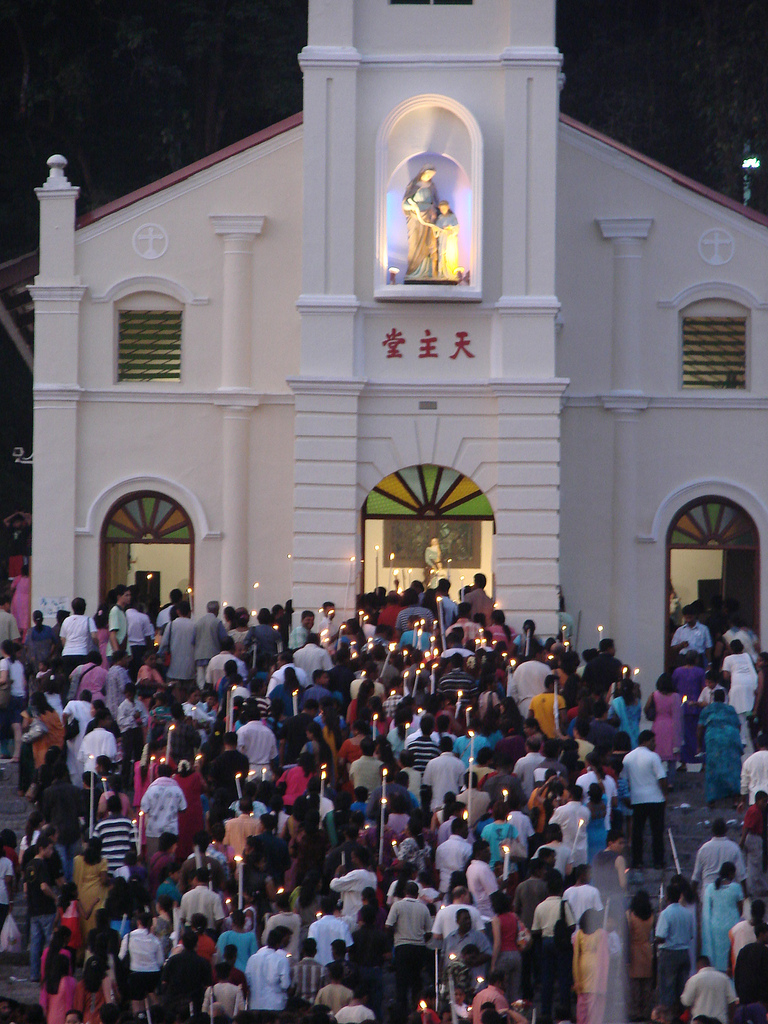
St. Anne's Church in Bukit Mertajam, Penang during its feast day

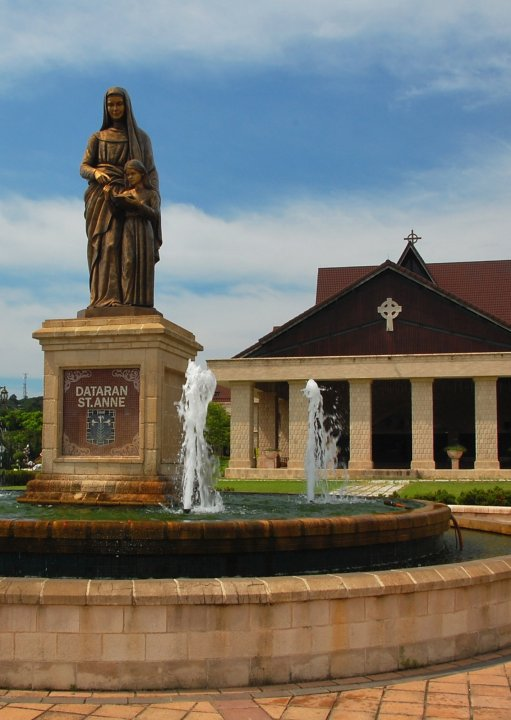
St. Anne's Church and St. Anne's Square

== List of Bishops of Penang ==
No.	Portrait	Name	From	Until	Insignia
1		Francis Chan (1913-1967)	1955	1967 (Died)	
2		Gregory Yong Sooi Ngean (1925-2008)	1967	1977 (Resigned)	
3		Anthony Soter Fernandez (1932-2020)	1977	1983 (Resigned)	
4		Antony Selvanayagam (born 1935)	1983	7 July 2011 (Resigned)	
5		Sebastian Francis (born 1951)	7 July 2011	Present	

== List of cathedrals of Penang ==
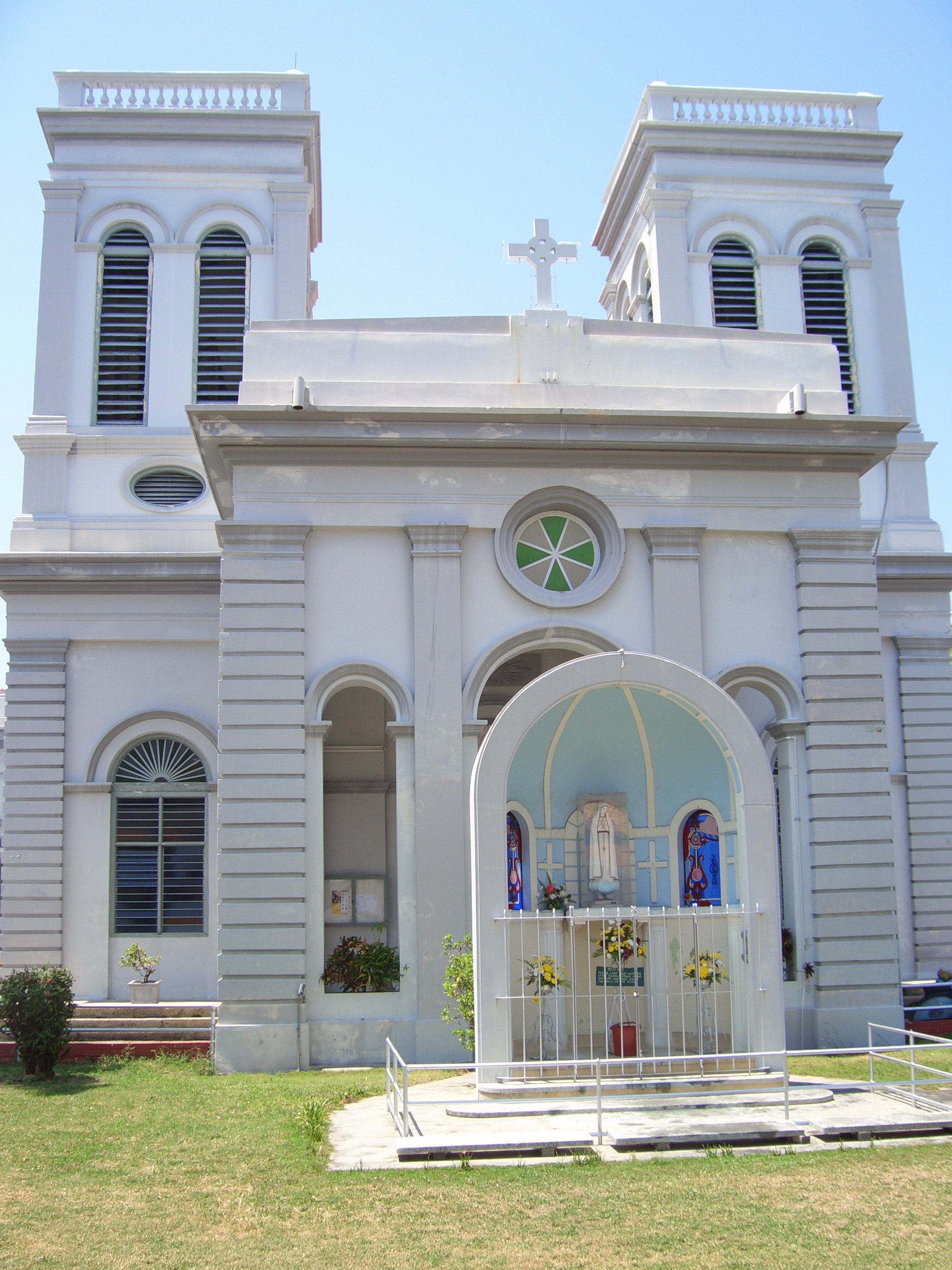
Church of the Assumption, Lebuh Farquhar, George Town, Penang was the cathedral from 1955–2003

- Cathedral of the Assumption (now church), Lebuh Farquhar, George Town, Penang (25 February 1955 – 20 January 2003)
- Cathedral of the Holy Spirit, Green Lane, Gelugor, Penang (20 January 2003 – present)

== See also ==
- Catholic Church in Malaysia
- List of Catholic dioceses in Malaysia
- List of Catholic dioceses (structured_view)-Episcopal Conference of Malaysia
