= Holy Spirit Cathedral, Penang =

Cathedral Of The Holy Spirit
- Malay: Katedral Roh Kudus
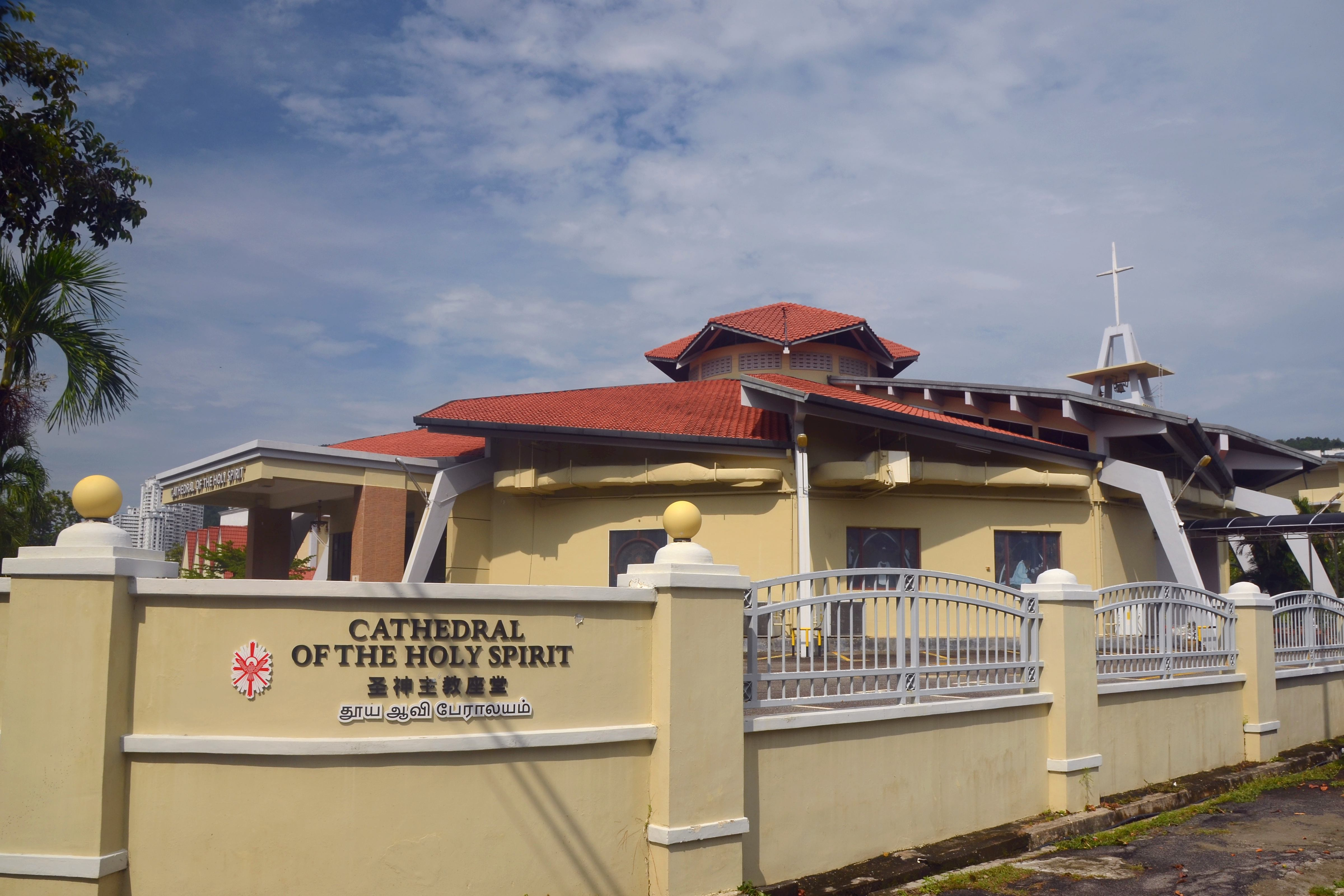

- Location within George Town
- 5.3939°N 100.3018°E
- Location: Tingkat Besi 1, Island Park, George Town, Penang
- Country: Malaysia
- Denomination: Roman Catholic
- Website: https://www.holyspiritcathedral.com/

History
- Founded: 1958
- Dedicated: 2003 (as Cathedral)

Architecture
- Years built: 1969

Administration
- Division: Penang Island
- Province: Kuala Lumpur
- Diocese: Penang

Clergy
- Bishop: Cardinal Sebastian Francis
- Priest(s): Fr. Raymond Raj (rector); Fr. Francis Anthony (priest-in-residence); Fr. Fabian Dicom (priest-in-residence); Fr. James Tan (priest-in-residence); Dcn Andrew Loh

The Cathedral of the Holy Spirit is a Roman Catholic cathedral within George Town in the Malaysian state of Penang. Sited at the residential estate of Island Park near Green Lane, the cathedral is a World Heritage Church (minor) and the seat of the Roman Catholic Bishop of Penang, currently Cardinal Sebastian Francis.

== History ==
The parish was founded in 1958, with about 1,000 parishioners and they celebrated Masses at the canteen of Convent Green Lane school. After 10 years of hard work in raising funds, they were ready to build a church. Mr. Seng Tuck Hooi, a forward-thinking architect who designed the first high rise building in Penang (the 11-storey Ambassador Hotel) was appointed as the lead architect for the church project.

Construction of the church finished in 1969 and the church was blessed by Msgr. Gregory Yong, then Bishop of Penang. In the 1990s, the parish community hall was named Dewan Holy Spirit and three levels of Sunday School classrooms were open.

In 2001, the church was closed for renovations to prepare for the dedication ceremony 2 years later. In 2003, the cathedral status was transferred from the former Cathedral of the Assumption to the Cathedral of the Holy Spirit. The Rite Of Dedication was held on 20 January 2003 and the new cathedral was blessed by Msgr. Antony Selvanayagam, Bishop of Penang.

In October 2007, the groundbreaking ceremony of the Church of Divine Mercy was held. The cathedral played a major role in the fundraising programs. The church, also called the Christian Community Centre, will have a main church accommodating 900 people, 15 classrooms of Sunday School classes and functions as well as a priests residence or known as a rectory.

It is located in Sungai Ara and caters to 2,500 parishioners living in Bayan Lepas (in which it also serves the Catholic staff members working at the Penang International Airport as well as nearby industrial factories). Previously, parishioners in that area had to travel to the cathedral 12 km away from the new church. The church was completed in July 2010 and the opening ceremony was held on 29 September 2010. It will be the first time in 41 years that a new Catholic church is built on Penang Island. On 29 September 2013, the Cathedral of the Holy Spirit was split to form a new parish, Church of Divine Mercy.

Currently, the Cathedral of the Holy Spirit is administered by Rev Fr. Joachim Robert (parish priest) in which he is assisted by Rev Fr. Francis Anthony (priest-in-residence) and serves the Catholic parishioners population of Batu Lanchang, Gelugor, Batu Uban, Sungai Dua as well as Jelutong, which also include students and faculty members of the Universiti Sains Malaysia higher learning institute as well as their dependents and relatives (but it is also served as its secondary sponsoring and nearest area parish, for its main sponsoring church attached to the said university's main campus is actually City Parish, George Town under the auspices of the Church of Our Lady of Sorrows in Macalister Road, George Town).

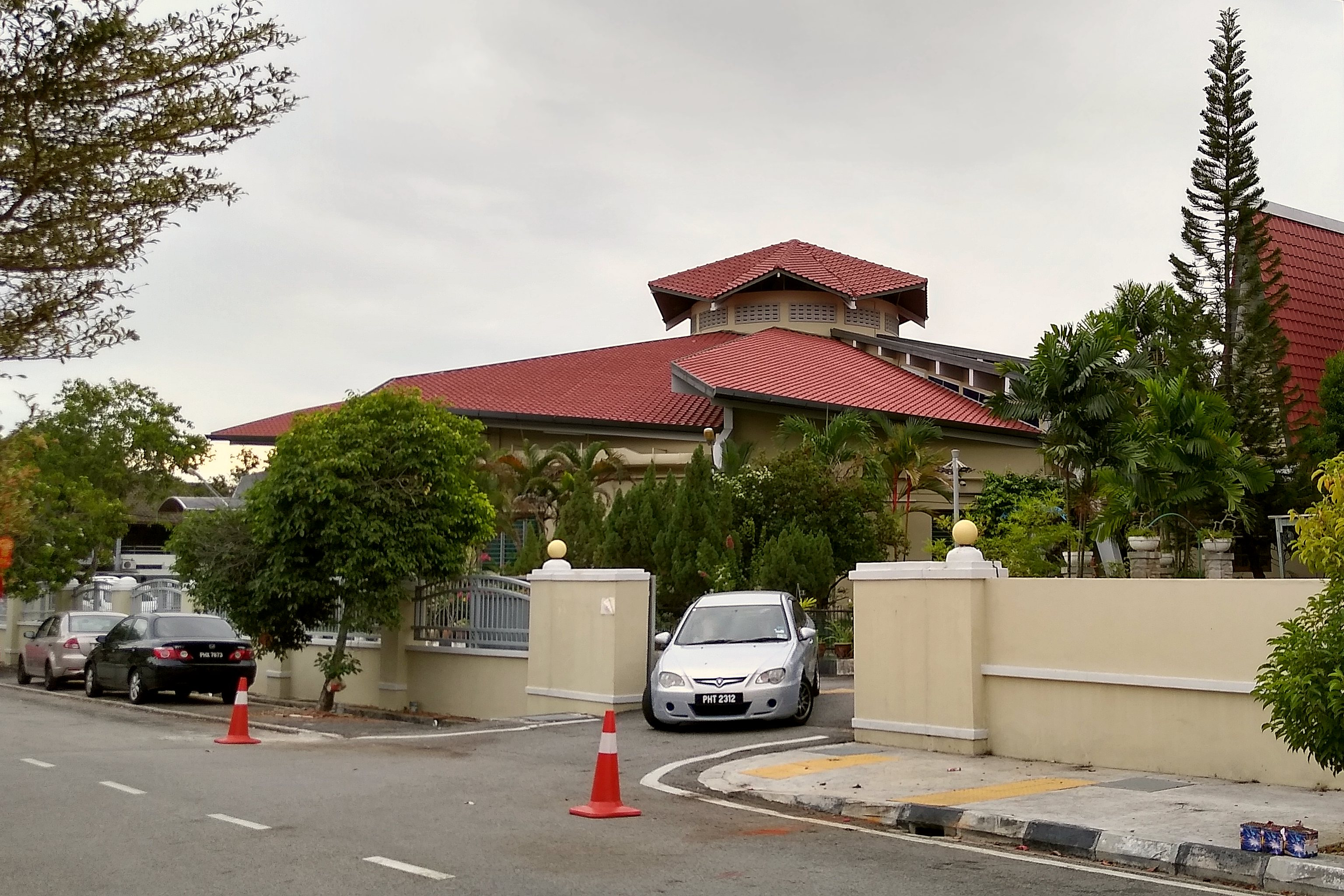
Cathedral of the Holy Spirit vehicle entrance in January 2020

== Mass Times ==
Daily Masses
6:40am Lauds followed by Mass English (Mondays, Tuesdays & Saturdays)
6:10pm Vespers followed by Mass English (Wednesdays, Thursdays & Fridays)
6:30pm Mass followed by Holy Hour English (last Friday of the month)

Saturday (Sunset) Mass
5:30pm Novena to Our Mother of Perpetual Help
6:00pm English

Sunday Masses
8:00am Mandarin
10:30am English
5:30pm Tamil (first Sunday of the month)
