= Church of the Assumption (Penang) =

- Malay: Gereja Assumption; Chinese: 圣母升天教堂; Tamil: விண்ணேற்பு தேவாலயம்
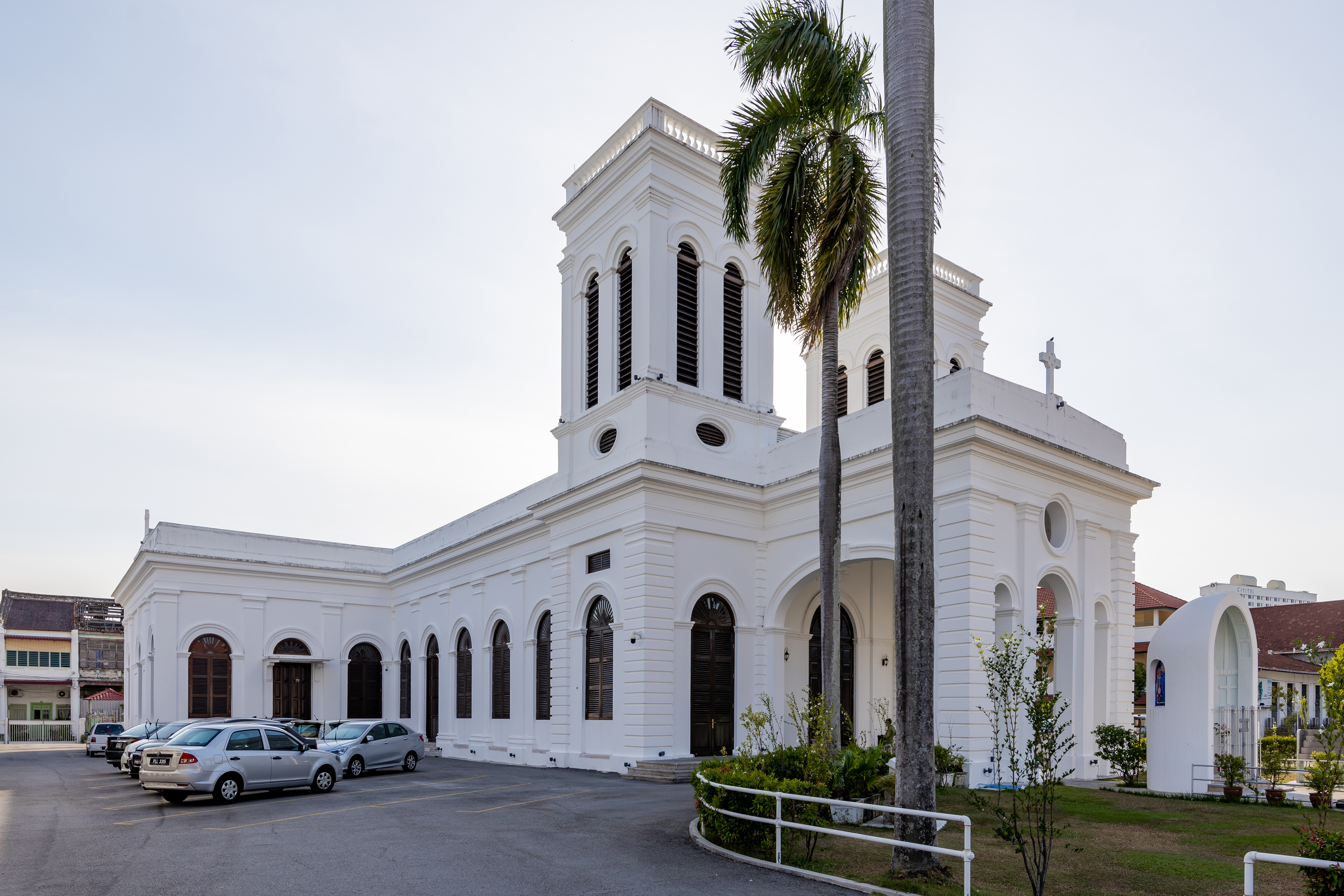

- Location within George Town
- 5°25′14.7426″N 100°20′16.1412″E
- Location: Farquhar Street; George Town, Penang
- Country: Malaysia
- Denomination: Roman Catholic
- Website: assumptionchurchpenang.org

History
- Former name: Cathedral of the Assumption
- Status: Parish church
- Founded: August 1786
- Founder(s): Captain Francis Light and friends
- Dedicated: 1955 (cathedral status)

Architecture
- Functional status: Active
- Style: Colonial
- Completed: 1787

Administration
- Province: Kuala Lumpur
- Diocese: Penang
- Parish: City Parish

Clergy
- Priest: Fr Edmund Woon

UNESCO World Heritage Site
- Type: Cultural
- Criteria: ii, iii, iv
- Designated: 2008 (32nd session)
- Reference no.: 1223
- Region: Asia-Pacific

The Church of the Assumption is a Roman Catholic church within George Town in the Malaysian state of Penang. Established following the founding of George Town in 1786, it is the third oldest Catholic church in Malaysia. The church was also the seat of the bishop of Penang from 1955 to 2003.

== History ==
In 1786, Captain Francis Light landed on Penang Island and named it Prince of Wales Island. He set up the Fort Cornwallis. In conjunction with their landing in Penang which coincides with the feast of the Assumption of The Blessed Mary on 15 August that year, he and his companions built a church and named it Church of the Assumption. It was the first Roman Catholic church in the northern region of Malaysia, as well as the first church built after the British landed in Penang. They went on to control Malaya later on.

As the population of Penang Island continues to increase, there was a need for a bigger church. In 1860, the present crucifix shaped church, was constructed. It was completed in 1861 and opened. It consists of two bell towers and a huge altar. The pipe organ, by Morton & Moody of Oakham, England, was installed in 1916 and the choir gallery was extended.

In December 1941, when the Japanese conquered Penang, the church was closed except for a few masses. It was said that during one day, when the bells of the church were tolled, a Japanese soldier went into the church to cut off the ropes, saying that the bells were noisy. Life went back to normal when the Japanese surrendered in August 1945.

In 1954, in conjunction with the Marian Year, the statue of Our Lady of Fatima was carried on a long procession through the streets of George Town. It was replaced with a shrine built in front of the church. The need for a diocese was raised up after the Japanese occupation. After much discussion, finally on 25 February 1955, the Penang Diocese was established together with the Archdiocese of Kuala Lumpur. At the same time, Bishop Francis Chan and Bishop Dominic Vendargon were appointed as bishops of Penang and Kuala Lumpur, respectively. This church, together with St. John's Cathedral in Kuala Lumpur, was given the cathedral status.

At that period of time, Cathedral of the Assumption served as the main church of the northern region of Malaysia. A lot of diocesan activities were held there. It was in the mid-1970s, when the cathedral and three other churches in George Town suffered a major setback. The Catholic population there started to dwindle until only about 1,500 Catholics were left in the city. Since the number of the priests were shrinking, in 1988 Bishop Antony Selvanayagam decided to merge the four parishes into one parish, named City Parish.

In the 1990s, main functions of the diocese were moved to other churches. That was also the time when the Bishop of Penang had a meeting with the priests to discuss about moving the cathedral to some other places. In 2001, Bishop Antony Selvanayagam announced that in January 2003, the status of the cathedral will be moved to the Cathedral of The Holy Spirit in Green Lane, Penang. This parish emerged as the new cathedral because it has a high number of parishioners and was also a very active parish in the diocese.

On 20 January 2003, the cathedral status and bishop's seat were officially moved to the new Cathedral of The Holy Spirit, thus lowering the status of the cathedral to Church of The Assumption. In 2008, when George Town and Malacca Town became UNESCO World Heritage Sites, the church was named as world heritage church. The church building was over 160 years old and has historical significance.

In 2011, the church marked a year-long celebration of its 225th anniversary and also fund-raising for the restoration of the pipe organ and church building. Also at the same time, the Assumption Formation Centre was opened to cater for visitors and also spiritual formations and church activities. In 2013, the church successfully restored its organ after receiving generous donations. A concert was held in June 2014, and various choirs were invited to sing and celebrate the restoration of "The Old Lady" organ.

In August 2016, the church was closed for 16 months to undergo a RM 2.5 million restoration project which included landscaping, repainting of the building, reconstruction of the sanctuary and installation of air conditioning units. The church was brought back to her former glory of 1928. The Church of the Assumption was rededicated on New Year's Day in January 2018. The Penang Roman Catholic Diocese Museum was also opened within the same grounds which features the history of the Catholic Church in Penang Island.

== Current status ==
The Church of the Assumption has been under the City Parish since 1988. Today the Parish Priest is Fr Edmund Woon. It is a World Heritage Church and the oldest church in Penang. It also has a 1914 Morton & Moody pipe organ and is one of seven pipe organs still in use in Malaysia today. The organ is usually played for Sunday morning masses and also during festivities like Easter and Christmas. The church also has a choir, accompanying the organ, singing in both Latin and English. Every year, on 15 August, the feast day of this church, the Assumption of the Blessed Virgin Mary is celebrated.

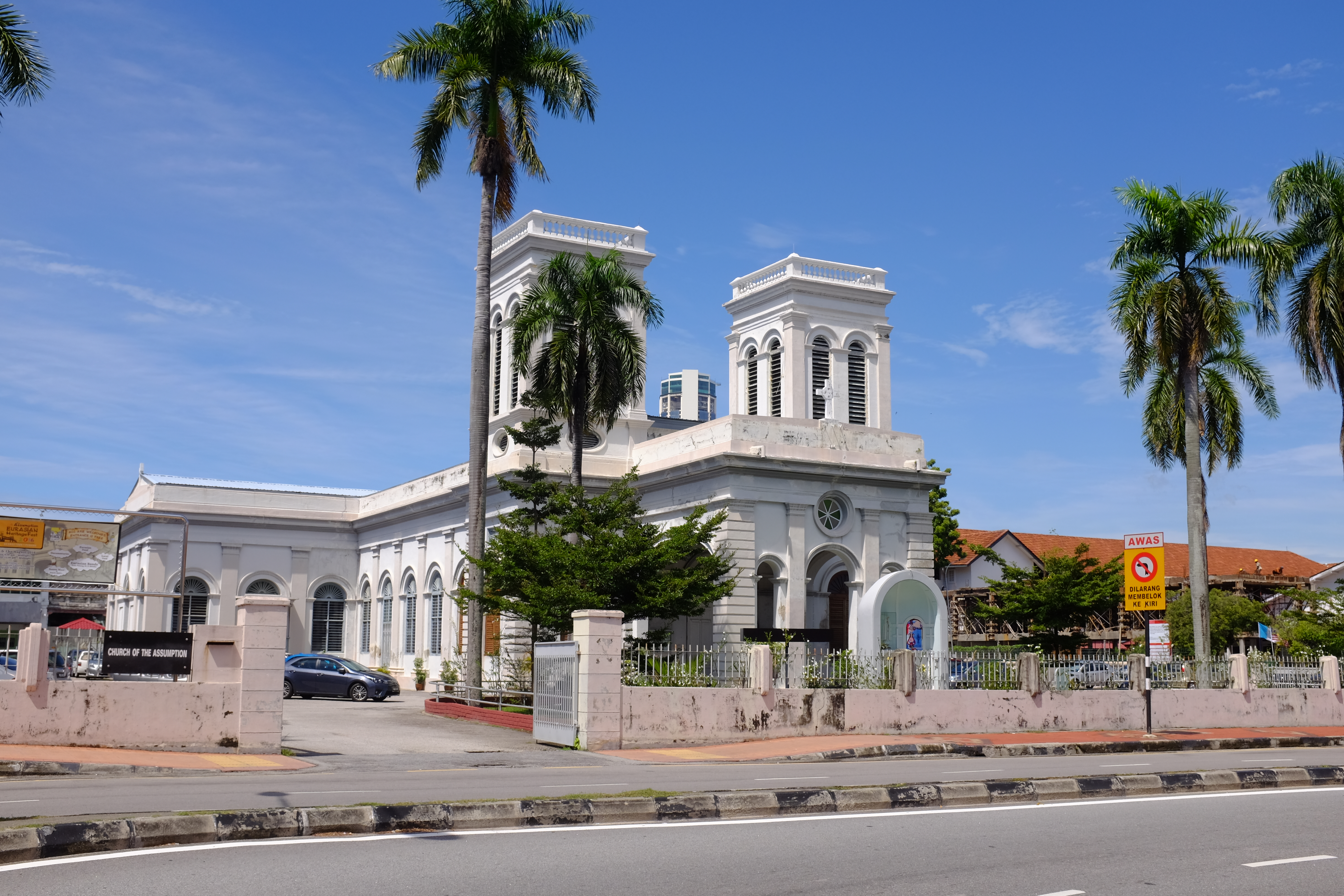
Church of the Assumption, Penang in 2016

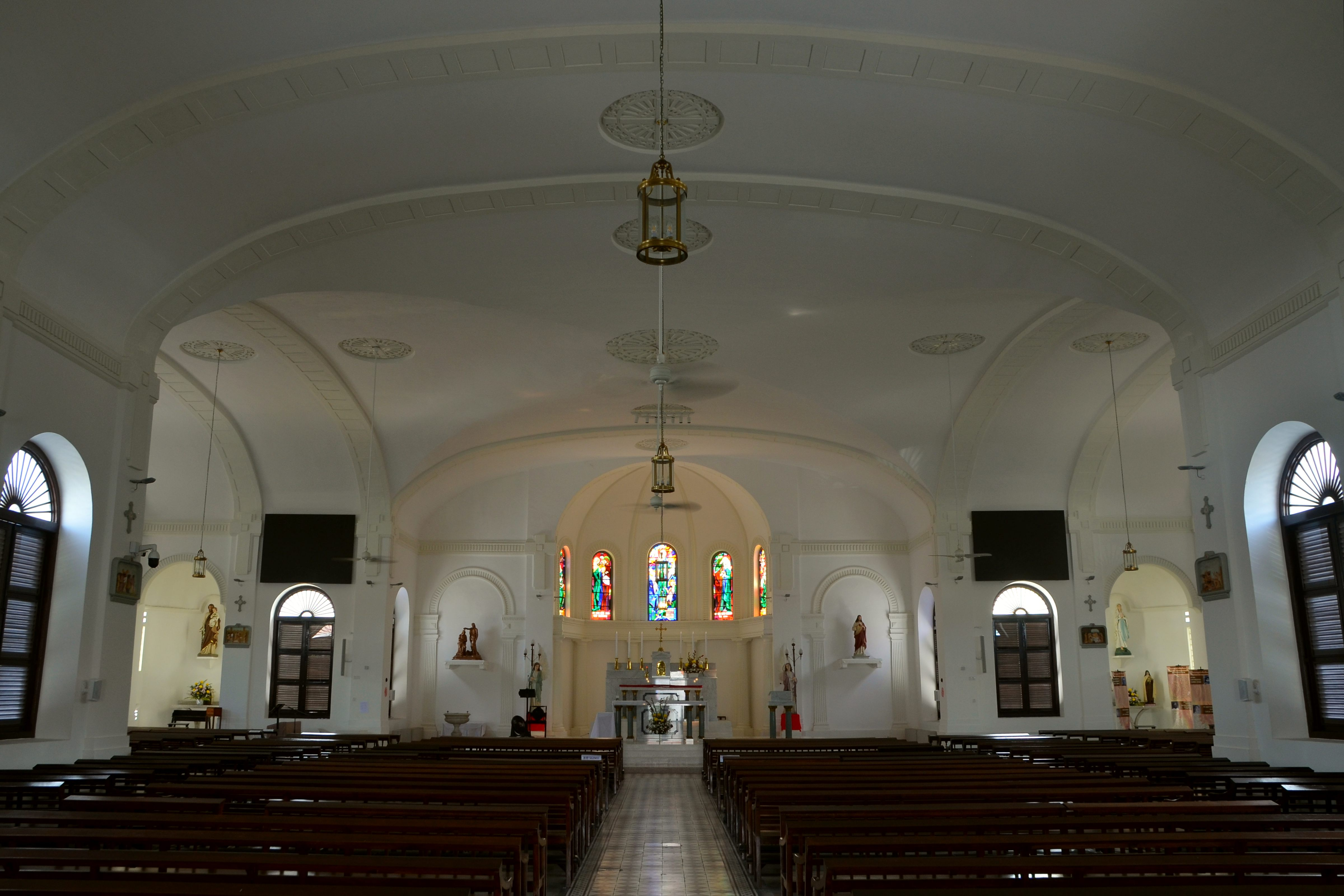
Interior facing the altar

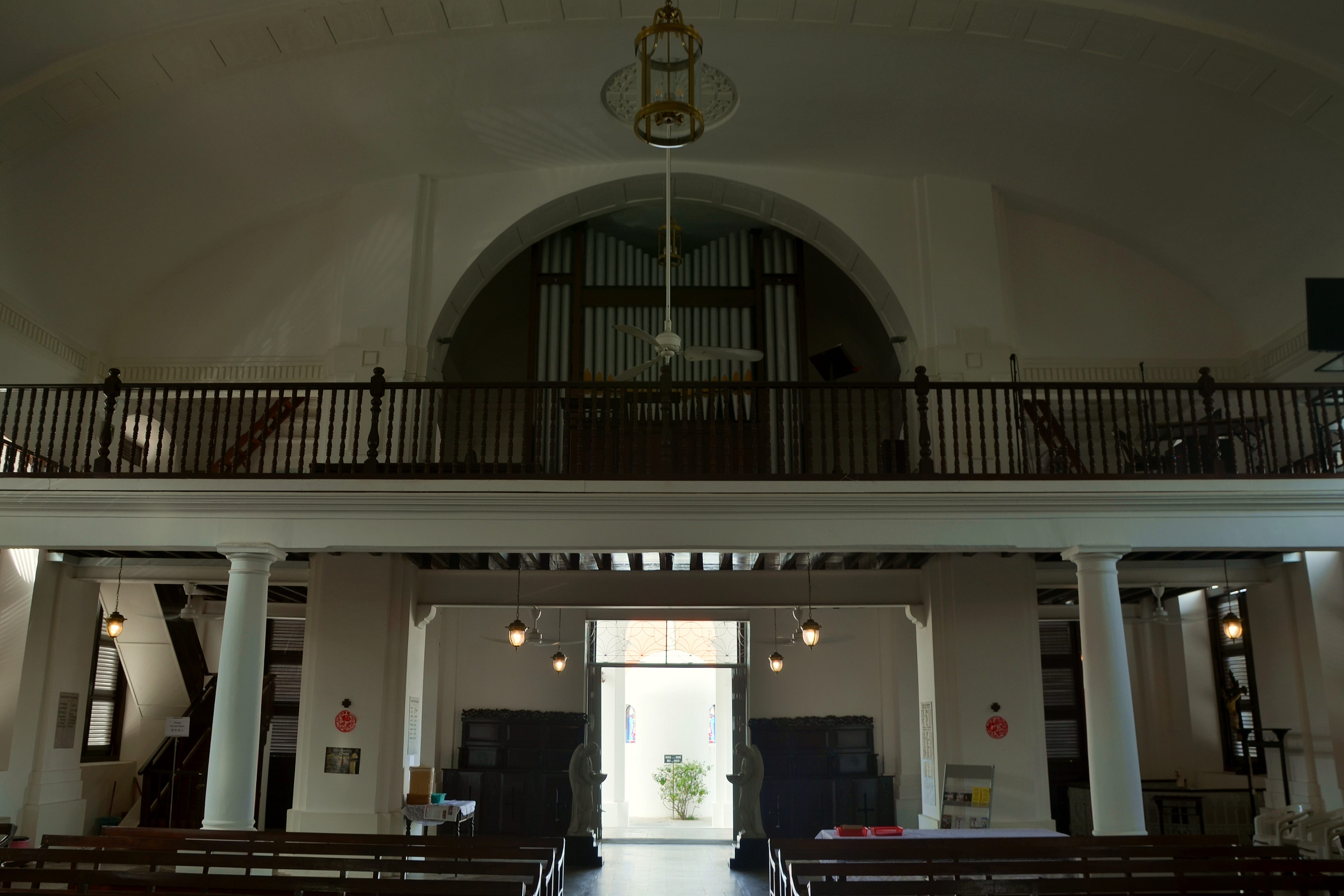
Interior facing the organ

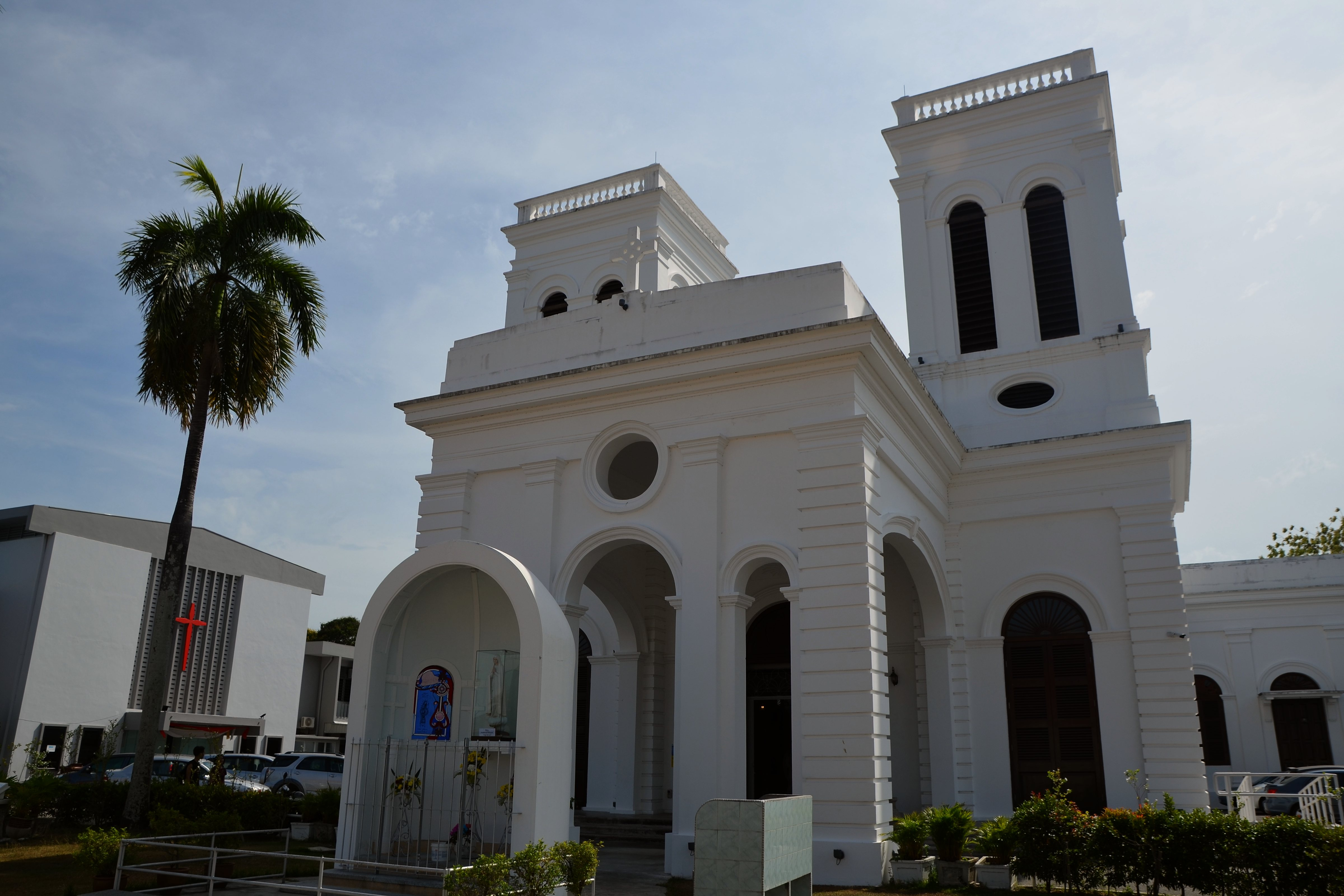
The half-capsule-shaped Shrine of Our Lady of Fatima in front and the 2018 extension on the left

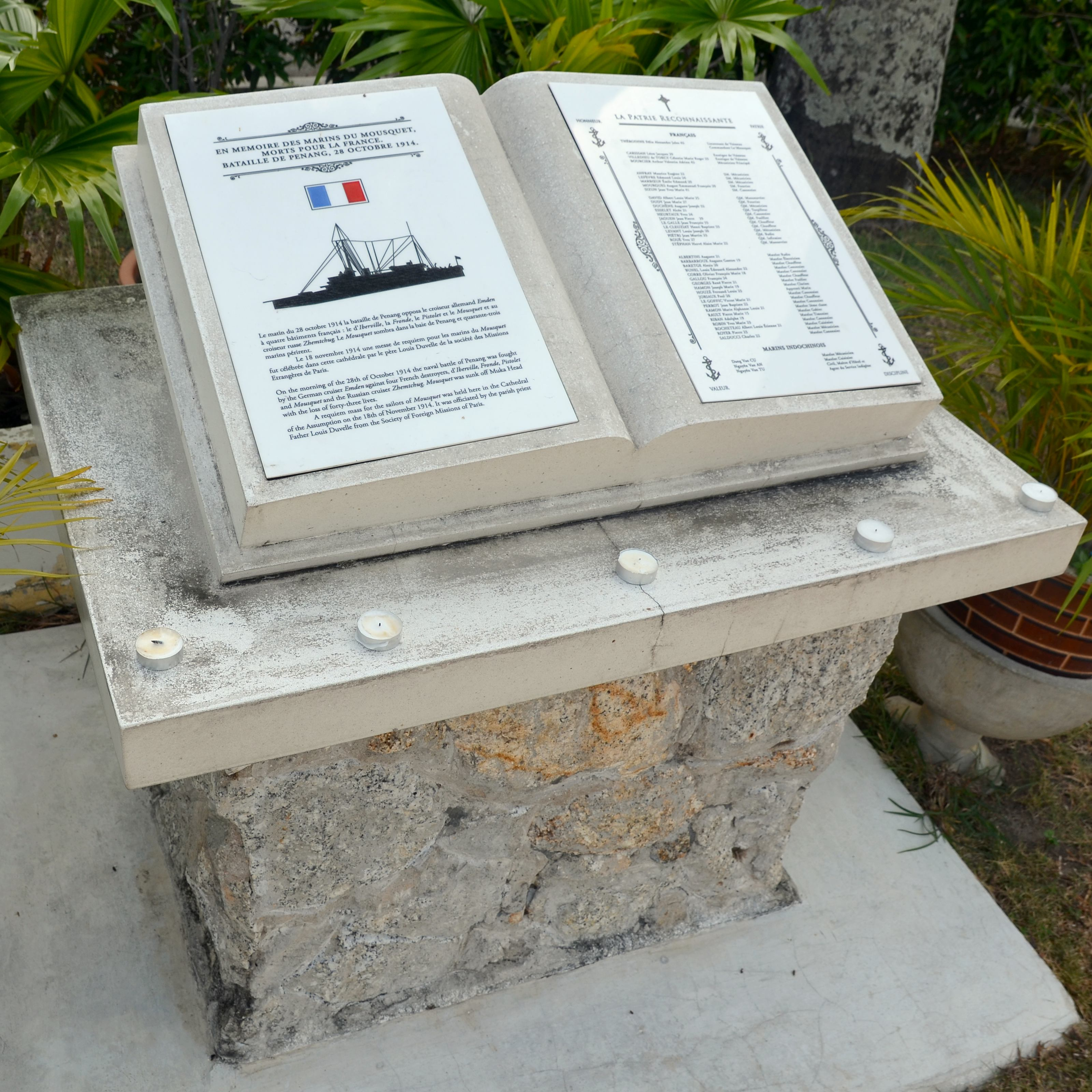
Memorial to French destroyer Mousquet sunk in the Battle of Penang in front of the church

== Mass times ==
Sunday Mass
10:00am English

== See also ==
- City Parish
- Roman Catholic Diocese of Penang
- Holy Spirit Cathedral, Penang
