= Church of Divine Mercy, Penang =

Coordinates: 5°18′54.8″N 100°15′51.6″E

Church of Divine Mercy
- Location: Jalan Kenari, Sungai Ara, George Town, Penang
- Country: Malaysia
- Denomination: Roman Catholic
- Website: http://www.cdm.my/

History
- Founded: July 2005
- Dedicated: 2010

Architecture
- Years built: 2007

Administration
- Division: Penang Island
- Diocese: Penang

Clergy
- Priest: Fr. Martin Arlando

The Church of Divine Mercy is a Roman Catholic church within George Town in the Malaysian state of Penang. Located at Sungai Ara, the church was established in 2005.

== History ==
The Catholic population in the southern part of Penang Island was increasing rapidly. In 1989, H. R. Watts, a parishioner of the Holy Spirit Cathedral, donated a piece of land to the diocese. He wished to build a Christian Community Centre and promote ecumenism. Seven years later, in 1996, there was a meeting between Bishop Antony Selvanayagam, the Bishop of Penang, and Major and Mrs. Barton (daughter of Mr. Watts) as representatives of the land owner. At this meeting, Mrs. Barton reiterated her father's wish that the land which was donated unconditionally was to be owned and managed by the Roman Catholic Church as a Christian facility.

The then parish priest also proposed building plans but things did not go well. In 2002, Msgr Stephen Liew, a former parish priest, formed a building committee under the advice of the bishop. The site plan was submitted in 2004 and the building plan in May 2005. In November 2004, the cathedral held a poll and listed a few names to decide an appropriate name for the church. The name Divine Mercy was chosen by most parishioners, and thus the church was named. The Church of Divine Mercy was officially launched and established in July 2005 by former parish priests, Fr. Francis Anthony and Fr. Henry Rajoo.

In total, the church and Christian Community Centre cost RM 8,000,000. Many fundraising drives were held, including a lucky draw, a food carnival, a grand dinner, and various coffee mornings. On 28 November 2007, the groundbreaking ceremony was held, with Bishop Antony Selvanayagam and former parish priests Fr. Francis Anthony and Fr. Henry Rajoo in attendance. On 15 March 2010, the topping-up ceremony was held with a mass.

In July 2010, the church was finally completed. It was the first in 41 years to be constructed with the previous churches being constructed in 1969 (Holy Spirit Cathedral and Risen Christ Church). Masses started on 22 August 2010 at the completed church building. On 29 September 2010, Bishop Antony Selvanayagam officiated the opening of the church. Also present were the former parish priests Fr. Francis Anthony, Fr. Henry Rajoo, and 8 other priests from Penang Island. About 1,500 Catholics gathered for the opening ceremony, which was much anticipated by the people. On 29 September 2013, on its 3rd anniversary, the Church of Divine Mercy was officially elevated to parish status with Fr. Martin Arlando being the first parish priest.

In 2015, the church erected a baptismal pool together with a reliquarium. The reliquarium now houses the sacred relics of Catholic saints, Faustina Kowalska and John Paul II. The Church of Divine Mercy is the first church in Malaysia to have obtained the relic of John Paul II.

== Current status ==
Currently, the Church of Divine Mercy caters to about 2,500 Catholics residing in the Bayan Lepas area (also serving the Catholic staff based in the Penang International Airport and nearby industrial factories, as well as their dependents and relatives, both local Penangites and migrants from across the country and, to a lesser extent, expatriates). The church's capacity currently seats 900 parishioners. The Christian Community Centre has a hall, meeting rooms, and classrooms to cater for talks and sessions. It also provides residence for the priests.

The parish priest is Rev Fr. Martin Arlando.

== See also ==
- Roman Catholic Diocese of Penang
- Holy Spirit Cathedral, Penang
