= St. Anthony's Church, Teluk Intan =

Church in Hilir Perak, Perak, Malaysia

Church of St. Anthony of Padua
- Malay: Gereja St. Anthony of Padua
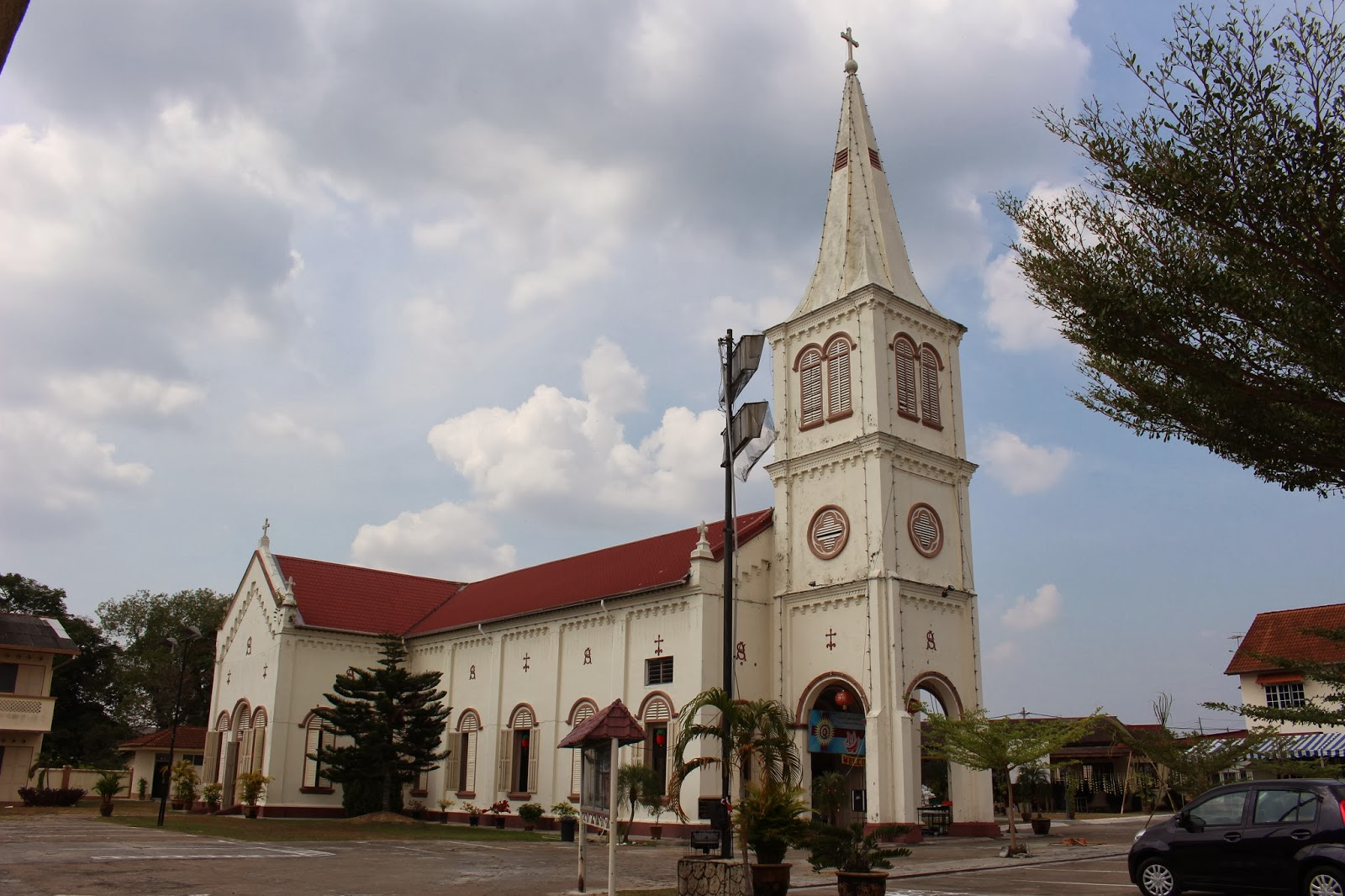
- St. Anthony's Church, Teluk Intan
- Church of St. Anthony of Padua
- 04°01′37.5658″N 101°01′23.5828″E
- Location: Jalan Mah Pooi Soo, Teluk Intan
- Country: Malaysia
- Language(s): Tamil, English, Mandarin and Malay
- Denomination: Roman Catholic
- Tradition: Latin rite
- Website: Website

History
- Founded: 1894
- Founder(s): René-Michel-Marie Fée, MEP
- Consecrated: 1923

Architecture
- Functional status: Active
- Architectural type: Neo-Gothic

Specifications
- Materials: brick

Administration
- Division: Perak State Deanery
- Archdiocese: Archdiocese of Kuala Lumpur
- Diocese: Diocese of Penang

The Church of St. Anthony of Padua is a Roman Catholic parish church under the jurisdiction of the Roman Catholic Diocese of Penang located in the town of Teluk Intan, Perak, Malaysia.

== History ==
The origin of the church dates back to 1894 when the French missionary priest Rev. Father René-Michel-Marie Fée, MEP, acquired a piece of land and built an attap roofed wooden chapel as part of the larger Parish of South Perak which included Tapah. The chapel was dedicated to St. Anthony of Padua.

The Rev. Father Fée was elevated to become the Bishop of Malacca in 1896 and was succeeded by the Rev. Father Louis Perrichon who ministered to the scattered Roman Catholic communities along the Tapah – Kuala Kubu Baru road. In 1910, a presbytery was built in the compound of the chapel during the watch of the sixth parish priest, the Rev. Father Donat Perrissoud who also extended his pastoral ministry to the townships of Lumut and Sitiawan.

In 1914, the original wood and attap chapel was destroyed by fire. Funds amounting to 70,000 Straits dollars was successfully raised and work begun on the building of a new church with the foundation stone laid on 7 May 1922. The new church building was consecrated on 6 May 1923 by Bishop Jean-Marie Mérel, Vicar-Apostolic Emeritus of Canton.

Today, weekly masses are held in Tamil and English while masses in Mandarin and Malaysian are held once a month.

=== Pastors ===
The following have served as pastors of the parish since its formation in 1894:

From	Until	Pastor	Notes
1894	1896	René-Michel-Marie Fée, MEP	Later Bishop of Malacca (1896)
1896	1900	Pierre-Louis Perrichon, MEP	Later Coadjutor Bishop of Malacca (1920)
1900	1901	Louis Duvelle, MEP	Established the Church of St. Anthony, Bukit Bintang, Kuala Lumpur in 1913
1901	1905	Emile Marie Henri Sausseau, MEP	Established the parish of the Church of Our Lady of Lourdes, Ipoh in 1905
1906	1909	Jean Passail, MEP	
1909	1914	Donat Perrissoud, MEP	
1914	1920	Emile Marie Henri Sausseau, MEP	
1929	1931	Jean Paul Baloche, MEP	
1931	1933	Michel Bonamy, MEP	Established St. Anthony's School in 1931
1934	1936	Ignatius John Aloysius	An alumnus of St. John's Institution and the first local Malayan parish priest. Later first Vicar general of the Roman Catholic Diocese of Penang (1955).
1936	1947	John Edmond	Oversaw the transfer of St. Anthony's School to the De La Salle Brothers.
1947	1949	Arokianathan	
1949	1950	Finian De Silva	
1950	1951	Dominic Vendargon	First Bishop (1955) and Archbishop of Kuala Lumpur (1972)
1951	1953	Arokianathan	
1953	1959	R. Brossard, MEP	
1959	1970	Mathias Ki	Established St. Anthony's Branch Primary School in Langkap in 1968 to provide education opportunities for the Orang Asli community
1970	1978	Maurice Surmon, MEP	
1978	1980	Felix Michael	
1980	1990	Anthony Chong	
1990	1996	Pierre Gauthier, MEP	
1996	2005	Arulnathan Joseph	
2005	2008	Vincent Paul	
2008	2012	Francis Andrew	
2012	2018	Francis Xavier Selvarajoo	
2018	present	David Lourdes	

== St. Anthony's School ==
The tenth parish priest, the Rev. Father Michel Bonamy, established a school known as St. Anthony's School in a wooden hut adjacent to the church. His successor, the Rev. Father John Edmond, acquired a piece of land opposite the church for the school and the first block of six classrooms was built on this land and officially opened by the British Resident of Perak, Marcus Rex, on 27 January 1941.

== See also ==
- Roman Catholicism in Malaysia
- Diocese of Penang
- Christianity in Malaysia
