= Minor Basilica of St. Anne =

- Malay: Basilika Minor St. Anne; Chinese: 圣安纳圣殿; Tamil: புனித அன்னாள் தேவாலயம்
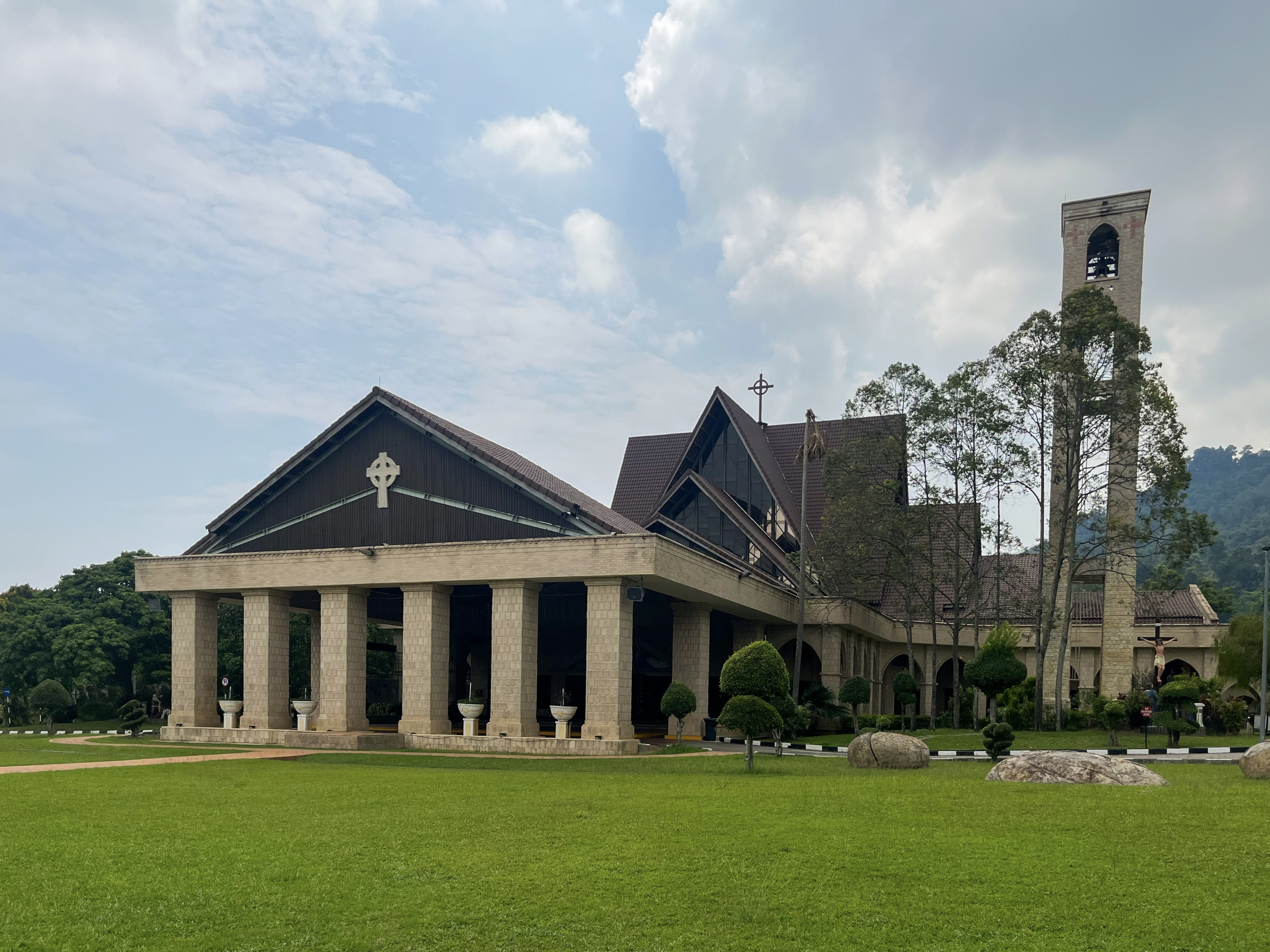
- Minor Basilica of St. Anne
- Minor Basilica of St. Anne
- 05°21′7.9992″N 100°28′38.6502″E
- Location: Jalan Kulim, Bukit Mertajam
- Country: Malaysia
- Language(s): Tamil, English, Malay, Mandarin
- Denomination: Roman Catholic
- Tradition: Latin rite
- Website: Website

History
- Founded: 1846
- Founder(s): Adolphe Couellan, MEP
- Consecrated: 2002

Architecture
- Functional status: Active
- Style: Minangkabau
- Years built: 4
- Groundbreaking: 1998
- Completed: 2002

Specifications
- Capacity: 2200
- Materials: brick

Administration
- Division: Northern Deanery
- Diocese: Diocese of Penang

Clergy
- Rector: Cardinal Sebastian Francis
- Priest: Dave J. Kameron

The Minor Basilica of St. Anne (Malay: Basilika Minor St. Anne, Tamil: புனித அன்னமாள் தேவாலயம், Punitha annamaal Tēvālayam) is a Roman Catholic church in Bukit Mertajam, Penang, Malaysia. It is one of the parishes in the Diocese of Penang. Its annual celebration of the feast of St Anne regularly attracts over 100,000 pilgrims from Malaysia and neighbouring countries including Singapore, Thailand, Vietnam, Indonesia, the Philippines and Australia. The celebration lasts for 10 days, and includes the actual feast day on 26 July.

== History ==
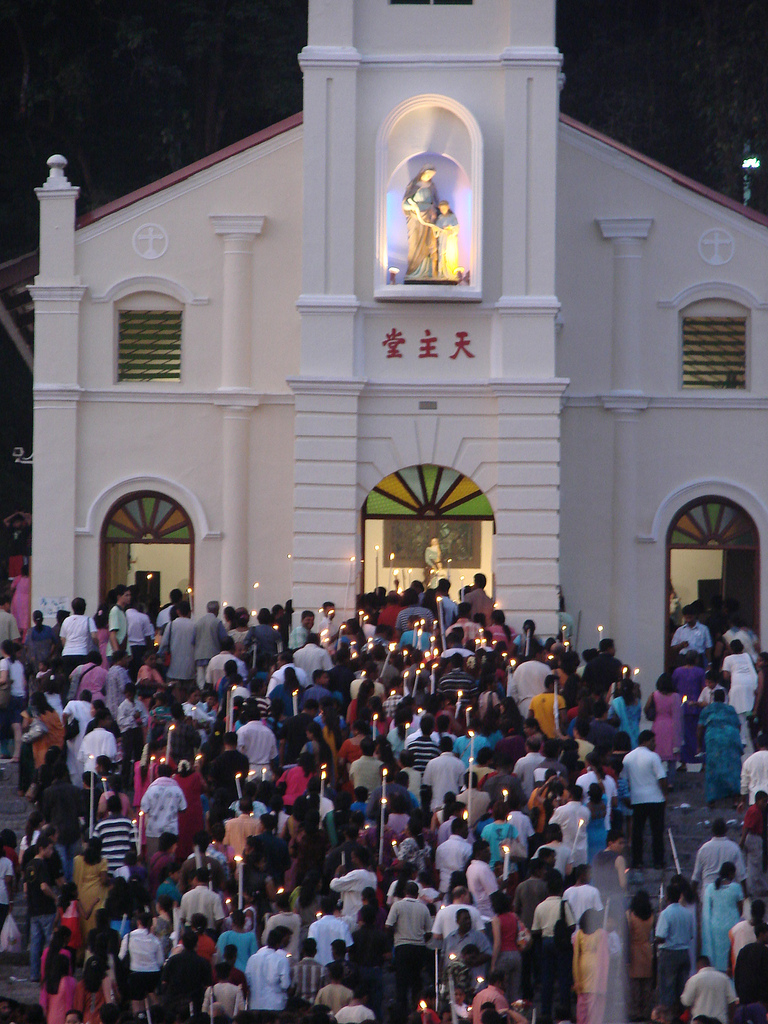
St Anne's annual feast day sees thousands of pilgrims at the Church.

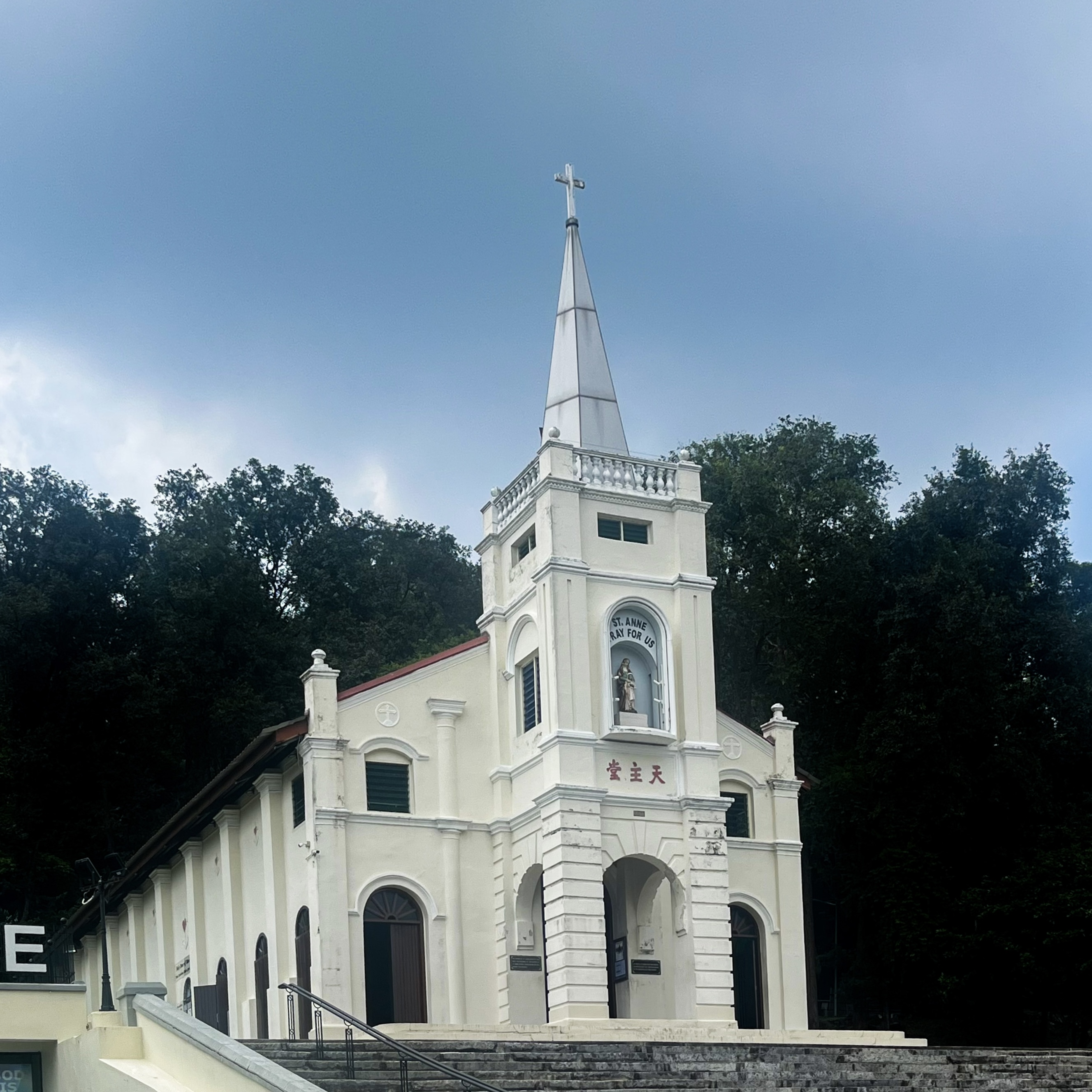
The Shrine of St. Anne, also commonly known as the Old Church.

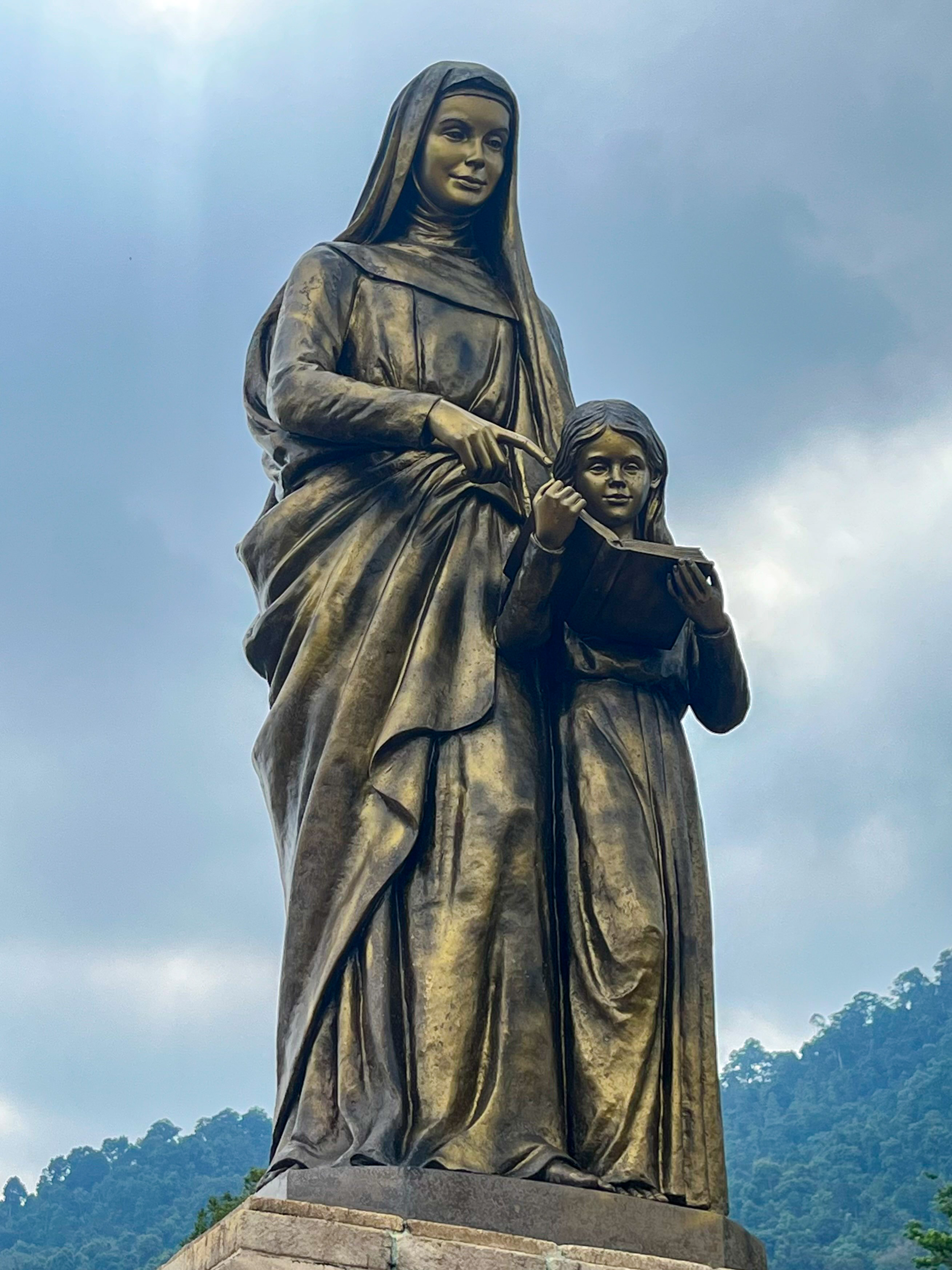
Dataran St. Anne, Statue outside the New Church.

The origins of St. Anne's Sanctuary can be traced back to 1833, when Chinese and Indian migrant workers arrived from the Batu Kawan area in Penang, where the Church Of St John the Baptist is, which is now in ruins. In 1840, Chinese Catholics settled at the foothills of Bukit Mertajam and worked in the farms and orchards. At that time, there was already an established parish in Batu Kawan. French missionaries from Batu Kawan came to Bukit Mertajam to minister to the Catholic families in the area.

The Catholics in Bukit Mertajam then numbered about 190. Adolphe Couellan, MEP was the first visiting priest. He built a chapel on top of the hill, about two kilometres from the town of Bukit Mertajam. The foundation and cornerstone of this first chapel can still be seen at its original site at St. Anne's Hill today.

The earliest records of the parish were those of baptisms in 1846, making it the year the parish was officially established. From 1860, visiting priests came from Permatang Tinggi. With the increase in the Catholic population, a bigger chapel was built in 1865 by Fr. Maistre MEP. The foundation stones of this second chapel can be found behind St. Anne's Water Fount.

Four years later, Allard MEP was assigned to the parish and became its first resident parish priest. In 1883, F. P. Sorin MEP took over the parish and served for 15 years; he built a bigger church in 1888 for local people as the Catholic population increased. Today, this same church still stands and has become the revered Shrine of Harmony. It was also called the "Old Church" by local parishioners. Fr. Sorin died on the feast of St. Anne, 26 July 1907, and was buried in the main aisle of the church that he built.

Soon after the Japanese occupation, the threat of Communism loomed over Malaysia. In 1948 the British Government declared a State of Emergency and the church grounds were designated as a no-go area. Curfew was imposed, and food was rationed. Many restrictions were imposed on the local population. Bukit Mertajam Hill was often bombarded by the army, as communist terrorists were believed to be hiding there.

Generally, many Chinese were suspected to be communist sympathisers by the British Government; they were uprooted from their lands and houses and relocated to the infamous Chinese New Villages throughout the country. Around Bukit Mertajam, we can still find them in Berapit, Machang Bubuk, Sungai Lembu and Junjung. Eventually, the old church grounds were declared out of bounds and labelled as a "black area" because of the communist insurgency. Consequently church services were temporarily held in the chapel of the Holy Infant Jesus Convent instead of the church. The emergency was not lifted until 1960. In 1977, the church started moving back to the St. Anne's Shrine and restoration works began after long having been abandoned. The stained glass inside and one of the three bells were recovered.

The parish priest, Thomas Chin, started to arrange a new church for worship because of the communist insurgency. In 1957 the land, which was bought by Fr. Teng, became the site of the church (referred to as the "new" church during its existence), which had a capacity of about seven hundred seats. It took about two years to complete; the church was then used by the parish for the next 46 years, until July 2002 when the parish moved back to the Sanctuary grounds. This church was the main centre for the parish and feast celebrations until 2002. During feasts pilgrims had to commute between the new church and St. Anne's Shrine, 2 km away, now occupied by the Kim Sen Primary School. From 1998 to 2002 Fr. Michael Cheah built the present church, which can accommodate 2,200 people, and is one of the largest churches in Malaysia. It was opened by the Apostolic Delegate to Malaysia on 26 July 2002. This church has Minangkabau roofs, reflecting Malaysian culture. An avenue named Dataran St. Anne was also constructed, in front of the church. Domus St Anne was also built to accommodate visiting pilgrims. A parish office, parish community centre and presbytery were also built.

In 2006, the church installed 'Statues of Passion' depicting the Stations of the Cross at a cost of RM600,000. A grotto dedicated in honour of the Blessed Virgin Mary was opened on 26 July 2008. In June 2010, a second accommodation place, St. Anne's Dorm, was opened by parish priest Stephen Liew.

The parish priest as of 2024 is Cardinal Sebastian Francis, bishop of Penang, assisted by Deacon Lazarus Jonathan as the Administrator in charge of Pastoral, Administration and Finance, and Deacon Dave Jean Kameron, two non-resident priests, Henry Rajoo and Louis Loi, and three resident priests, Nelson Joseph, Bernard Hyacinth SJ and Raymond Raj.

St. Anne's Church administers the Chapel of Our Lady of Sorrows in Alma, and Chapel of Our Lady of Fatima in Berapit. In 2019, it was granted the title of 'Minor Basilica' by Pope Francis through the Congregation for Divine Worship and the Discipline of the Sacraments.

Many pilgrims visit the minor basilica year-round. The Penang state government has made the minor basilica an official tourist spot for the state; people from different nations visit as tourists or pilgrims.

== Feast ==
Generally, Catholics celebrate the feast day of its saints on one day, for example, Saint Patrick's Day. While the feast day of St Anne is on 26 July, it is celebrated for ten days at Bukit Mertajam, including or immediately after the actual day. Celebrations include a 45-minute long candlelight procession, a nine-day novena and adoration of the Blessed Sacrament. Pilgrims, estimated to be around half a million, come from Malaysia, neighbouring countries and further afield.

== See also ==
- Diocese Of Penang
- Roman Catholicism in Malaysia
