= Green Lane, George Town =

Road in the Malaysian state of Penang

Green Lane
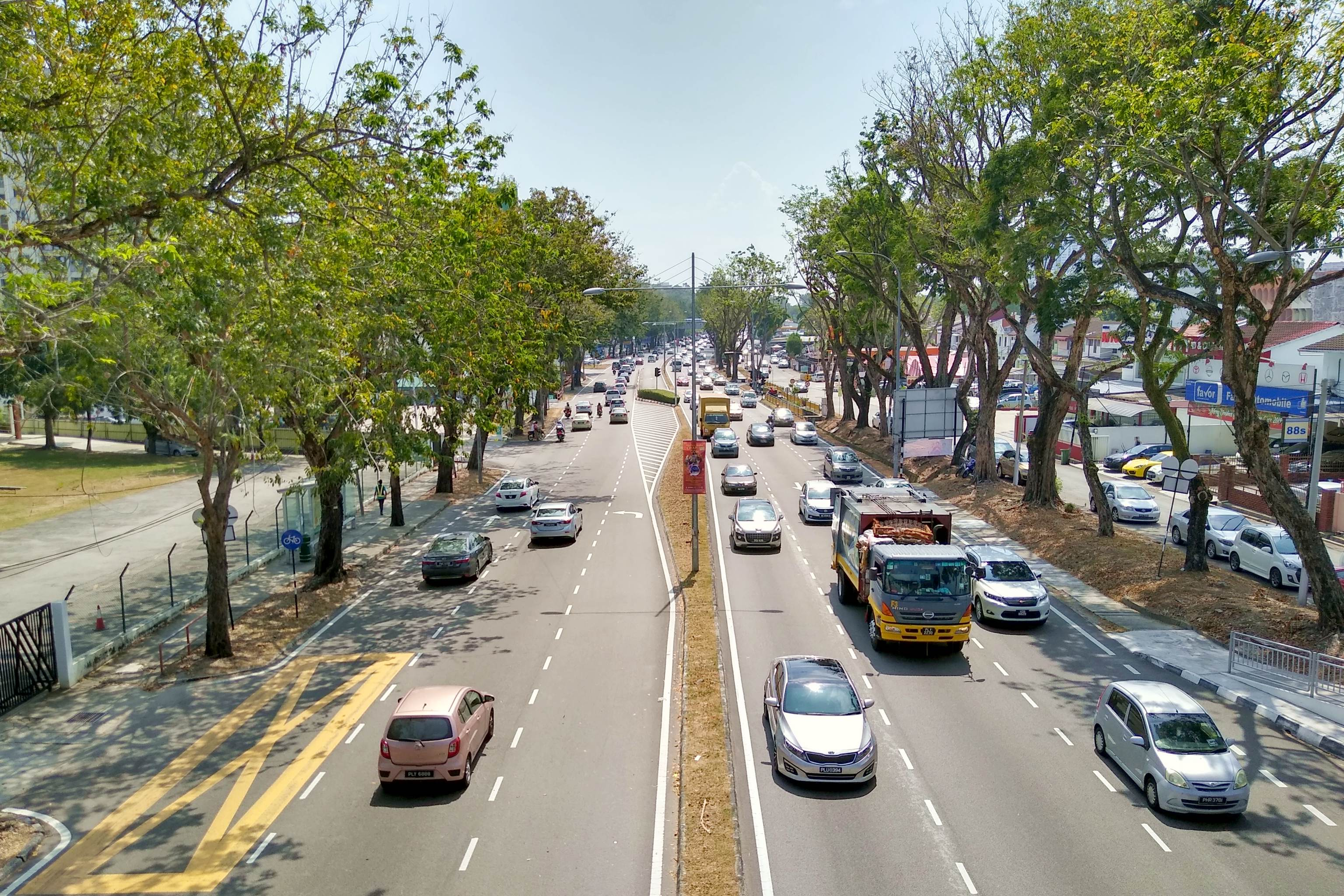
- Interactive map of Green Lane
- Native name: Malay: Jalan Masjid Negeri; Chinese: 青草巷
- Maintained by: the Penang Island City Council
- Component highways: P19 Penang Middle Ring Road
- Location: George Town
- Coordinates: 5.404637°N 100.303638°E
- North end: Scotland Road; Ayer Itam Road
- South end: Udini Roundabout
- JALAN MASJID NEGERI Green Lane11600 P. PINANG

Green Lane is a major thoroughfare within the city of George Town in the Malaysian state of Penang. Part of Penang Middle Ring Road, Green Lane starts from the intersection with Scotland and Ayer Itam roads, and stretches southwards to the Udini Roundabout.

Once a quiet, leafy road, Green Lane has witnessed rapid urbanisation since the 1950s, turning it into an affluent neighbourhood. Even so, the road is still well-known for its greenery, with mature trees lining both sides of Green Lane, as well as its central divider. Green Lane is also where two of Penang's top missionary schools – Penang Free School and Convent Green Lane – are located.

== Etymology ==
Whilst Green Lane was officially renamed as Jalan Masjid Negeri in the 1980s, local Penangites still refer to the road as Green Lane. This is partly because the new name sounds unwieldy, but also reflects a strong sense of conservatism among the locals, who view Penang's colonial history as part of their local identity.

== History ==
Up until the mid-20th century, Green Lane was home to a small farming community. At the time, much of the road traversed through the countryside outside of George Town. In 1928, Penang Free School was relocated, from Farquhar Street in the city centre, to Green Lane.

Since the 1950s, Green Lane has been developed into an affluent suburban neighbourhood, with residential estates such as Taman Greenview, Taman Green Lane and Island Glades lining the road. The massive industrialisation in Bayan Lepas to the south further boosted Green Lane's importance as a major trunk road between George Town and Bayan Lepas.

In the 1980s, Green Lane was renamed as Jalan Masjid Negeri in Malay to commemorate the completion of Penang's new State Mosque along the road. However, this renaming exercise is not well-received by local Penangites, who still prefer to use the road's colonial name to this day.

To accommodate the increase in vehicular traffic, a number of overpasses have been built and a stretch of Green Lane was widened to three lanes in 2015. However, traffic congestion along Green Lane remains a problem, especially during the rush hours.

== Education ==
Green Lane is home to two missionary schools – Penang Free School and Convent Green Lane. In addition, the Penang Digital Library, the first library of its kind in Malaysia, is also located within the compounds of Penang Free School.

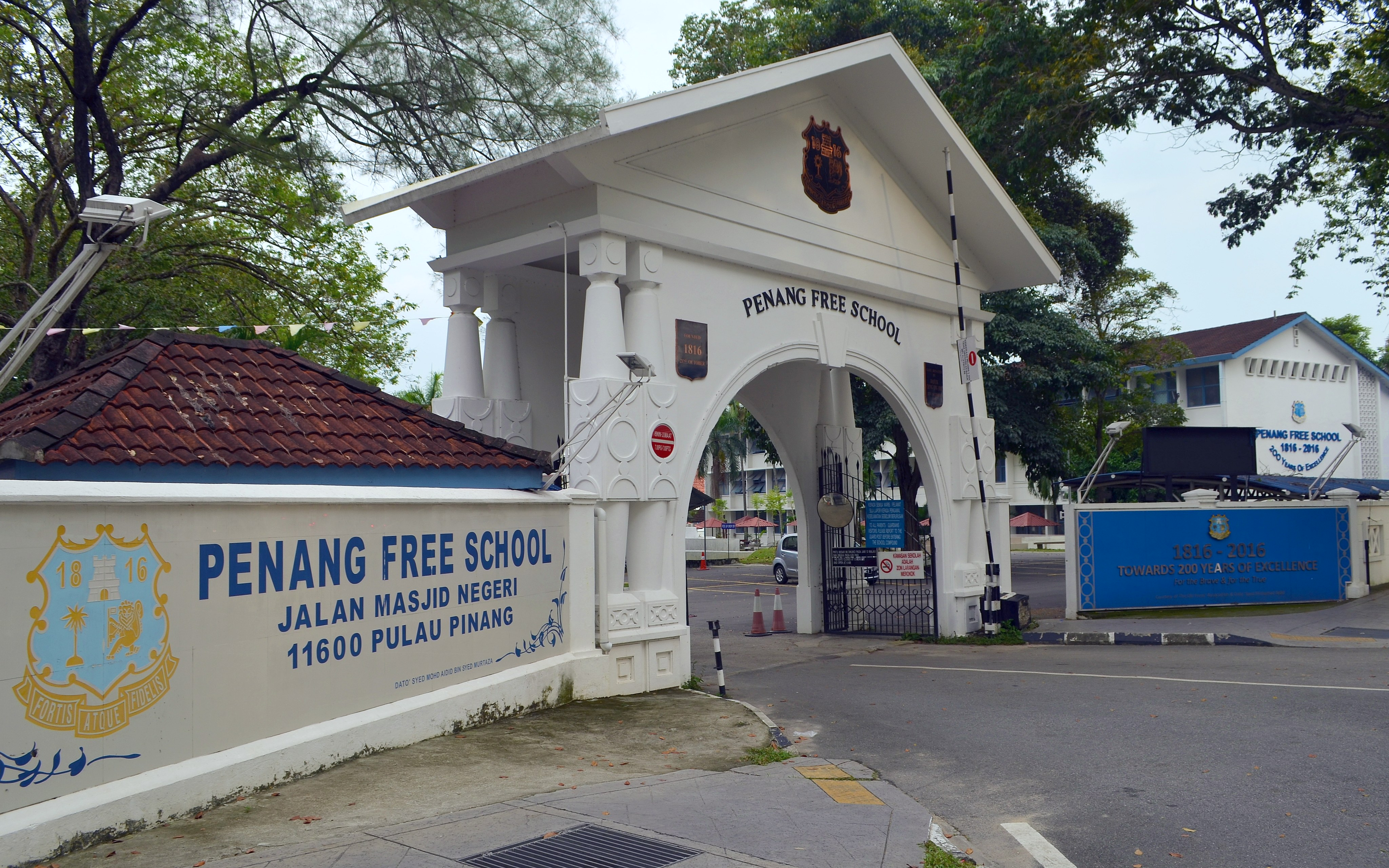
Penang Free School, the oldest English school in Southeast Asia, was relocated to Green Lane in 1928.

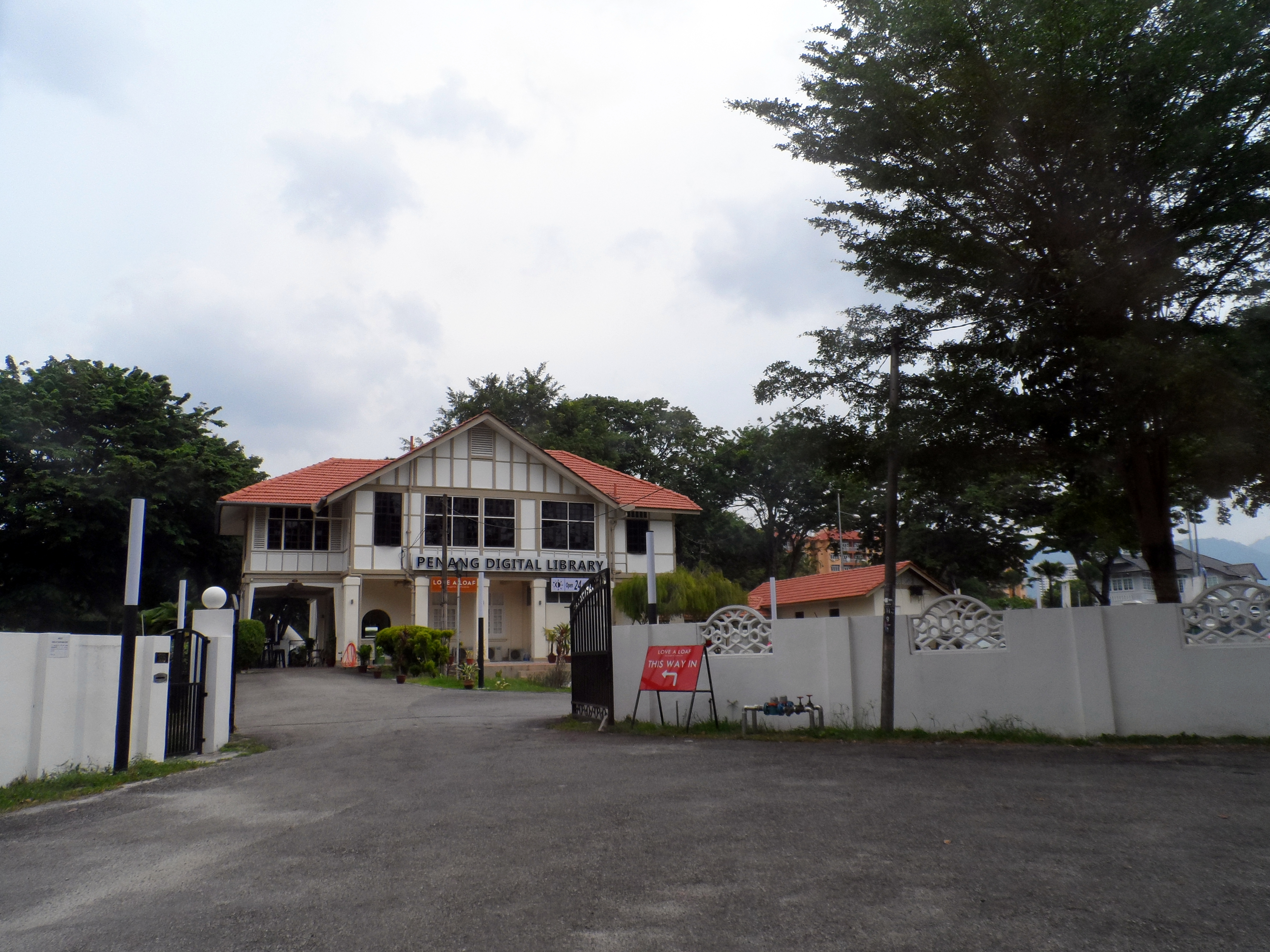
The Penang Digital Library was launched by the Penang state government in 2016.

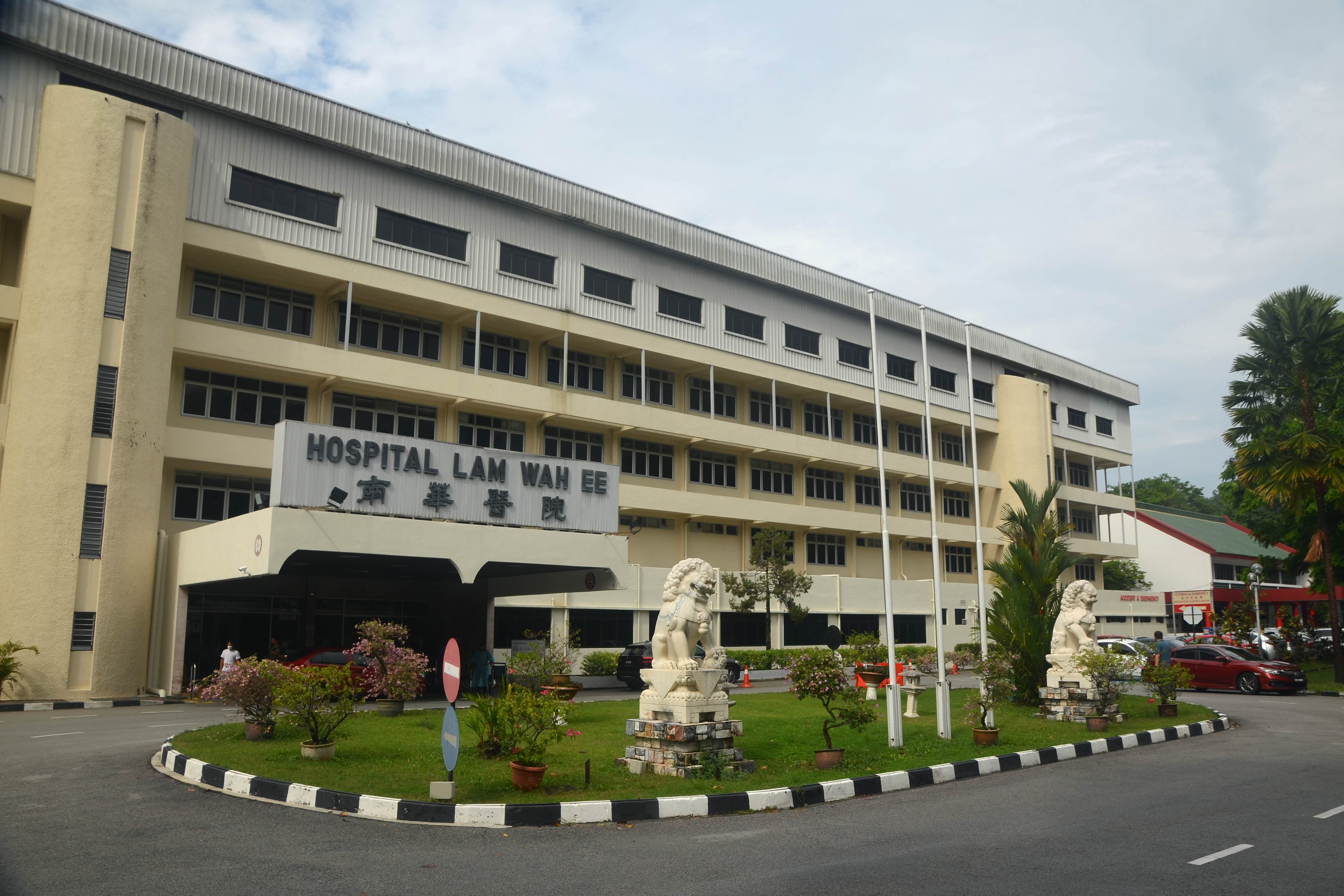
Lam Wah Ee Hospital main building.

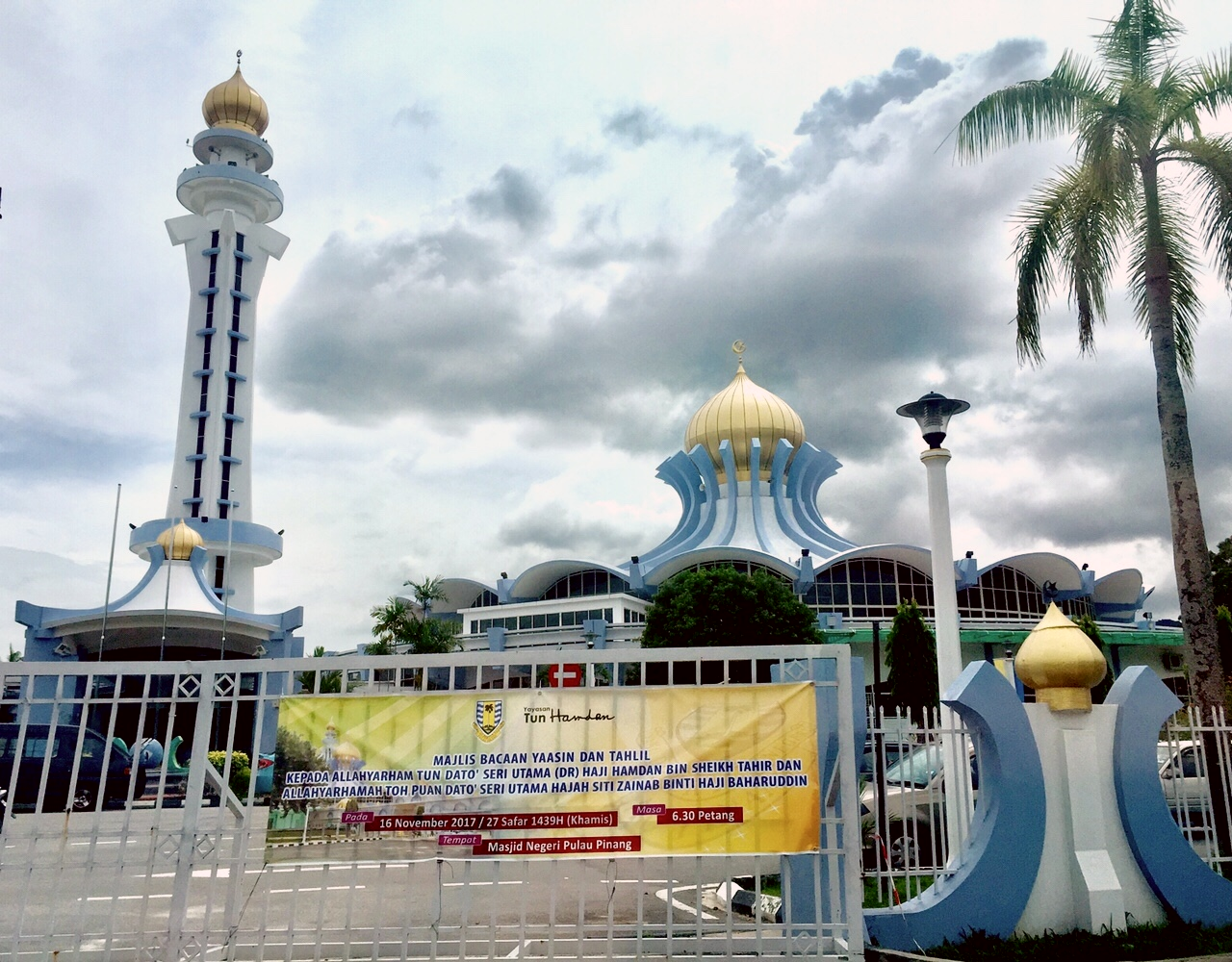
Green Lane was renamed Jalan Masjid Negeri after the Penang State Mosque along the road.

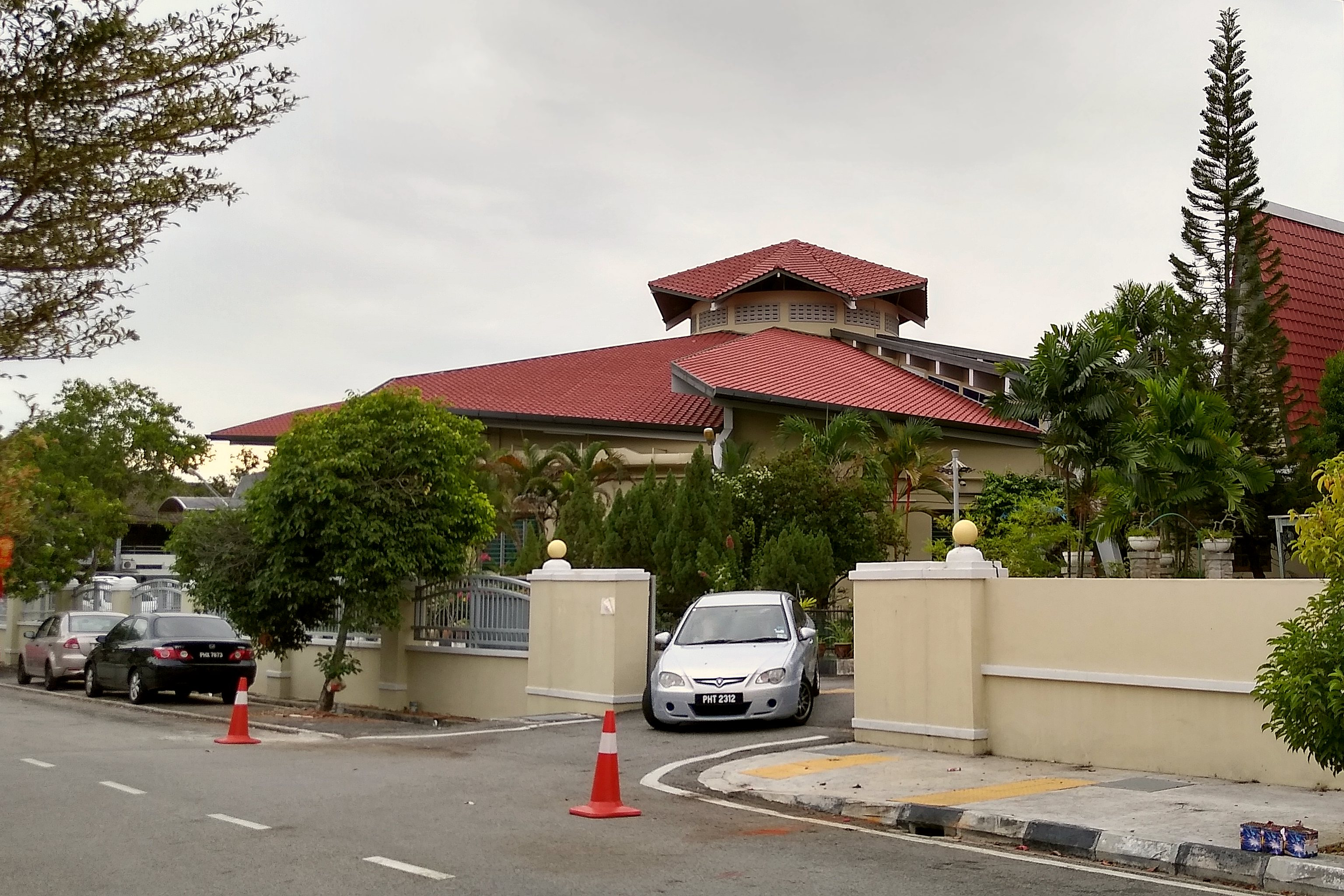
The seat of the bishop of the Roman Catholic Diocese of Penang was moved to the Holy Spirit Cathedral in 2003.

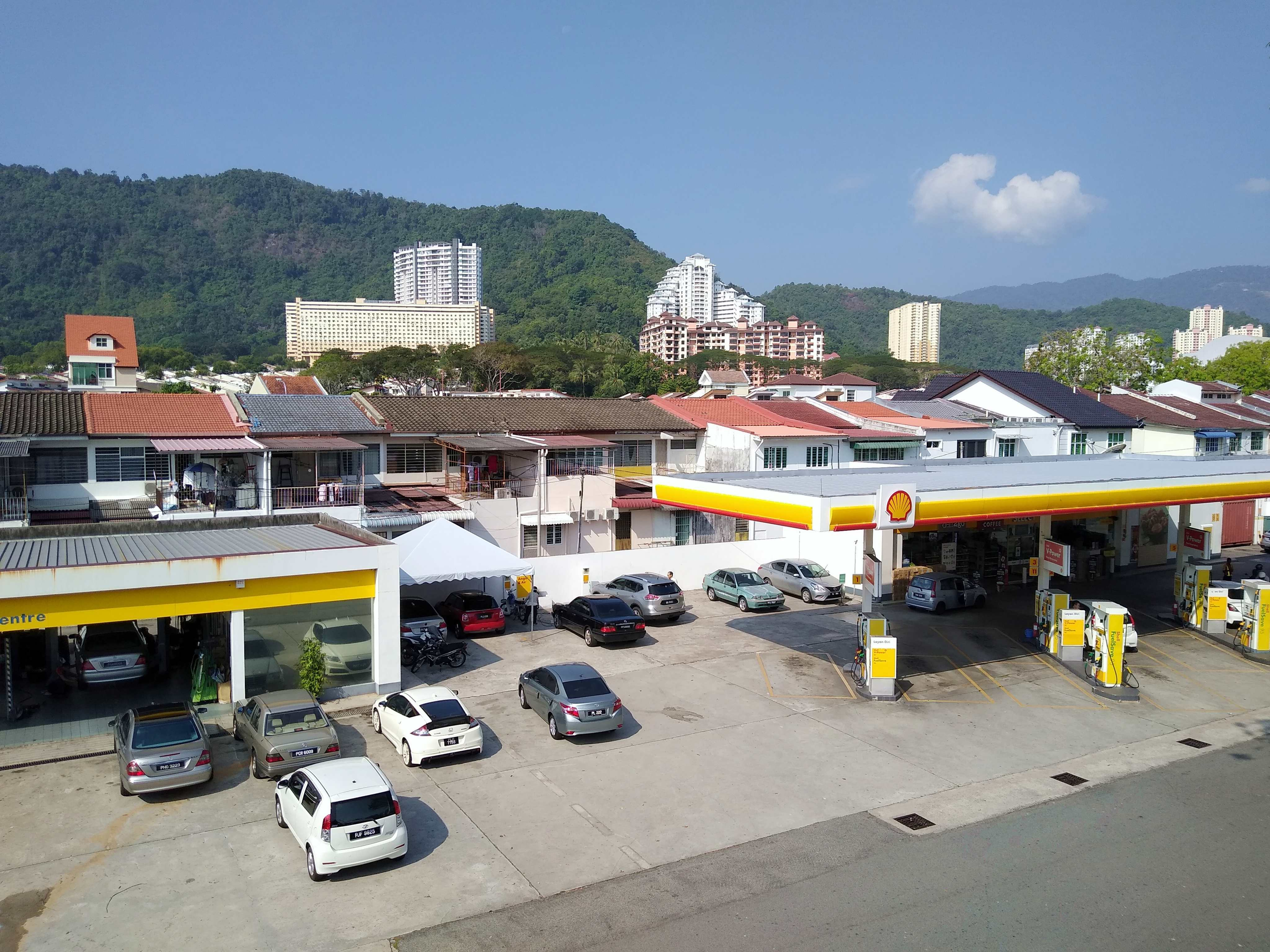
Shell petrol station in front of Island Glades and Island Park.

== Health care ==
A handful of private hospitals are situated along Green Lane. The most prominent of all is the Lam Wah Ee Hospital, at the junction with Jalan Tan Sri Teh Ewe Lim. Newer specialist centres along Green Lane include the Carl Corrynton Medical Centre and the Optimax Eye Specialist Hospital.

== Places of worship ==
Several places of worship of various religions can be found along Green Lane, including the Penang State Mosque, the Malaysian Buddhist Meditation Centre, Wat Pinbang-Onn and the Cathedral of the Holy Spirit.
