= Church of Our Lady of Lourdes, Ipoh =

Church in Perak, Malaysia

Coordinates: 4°36′11.3″N 101°04′07.3″E

The Church of Our Lady of Lourdes was officially established by Father Emile Marie Henri Sausseau (MEP) in 1905 at Ipoh, Malaysia. In 2010, the Heritage Gallery was established at the church.

== Priests ==
Numerous priests from Paris foreign missions (MEP) and from Malaysia have served as parish priests and assistant parish priests at this church.

No.	Parish Priest	Year	Assistant Priest	Year
1.	Fr. Emile Marie Henrie Sausseau (MEP)	1905 - September 1920	Fr. Noel Joseph Deredec (MEP)	1920
2.	Fr. Noel Joseph Deredec (MEP)	September 1921 - 1930	Fr. Joseph Arcand @ Ulric Arcand (MEP)	May 1928 - December 1928
3.	Fr. John Edmond	1930 - January 1936		
4.	Fr. Finian de Silva	20 April 1936 - September 1949		
5.	Fr. Xavier Anthony Dass	27 September 1949 - 1961	Fr. Anthony Dorett Fr. Henri Vetter (MEP); Fr. Louis Stanislaus; Fr. Lionel Stanislaus Norris Fr. Andrew Lau Tuck Ching	November 1952 - May 1955 1955 - 1956 1959 - 1962 1961 1961 - 1962
6.	Fr. Lionel Stanislaus Norris (was awarded Pingat Jasa Kebaktian (PJK) on 19 January 1971 by Sultan of Kedah who was also the Yang di-Pertuan Agong, Sultan Abdul Halim Muadzam Shah)	June 1961 - March 1963	Fr. Andrew Lau Tuck Ching Fr. Jean Caset (MEP)	1961 - 1962 1962 - 1963
7.	Fr. Arsene Rigottier (MEP)	1963 - 1970	Fr. Jean Caset (MEP) Fr. Lucien Catel (MEP) Fr. Robert Adrian Augustin Fr. Emile Grandgirard (MEP); Fr. Murphy Nicholas Xavier Pakiam	1962 - 1963 1963 - 1966 1966 - 1967 1967 - 1970 1967 - 1970
8.	Fr. Murphy Nicholas Xavier Pakiam (Archbishop Emeritus Tan Sri Datuk Murphy Pakiam PSM., PJN., DD., became the 3rd Metropolitan Archbishop of the Roman CatholicArchdiocese of Kuala Lumpur, Malaysia (29 May 2003 – 13 December 2013) )	1970 - 1971	Fr. Emile Grandgirard (MEP); Fr. Joseph Victor; Fr. Francis Anthony	1970 1970 - 1971 21 June 1970 - 1972
9.	Fr. Francis Anthony	August 1972 - 24 May 1975	Fr. Francis Regis	1973- 1975
10.	Fr. Francis Regis	June 1975 - 1977	Fr. Lionel Stanislaus Norris	1975 -
11.	Fr. Anthony Dorett	January 1978 - 1984	Fr. Marshall Fernandez Fr. Maiccal Sinnappan	1977 - 1981 1978 - 1984
12.	Fr. Alexander Joseph Edwin	1984 - 1999	Fr. Maiccal Sinnappan Fr. Francis Xavier Selvarajoo Fr. Martin Lam Peng Khuen Fr. Anthony Pillai; Fr. Gregory Aloysius Hwatt; Fr. Fabian Felix Dicom	1984; 1984 - 1987 1984 - 1986; 1990 - 1991; 1993; 1996 - 1998
13.	Fr. Clement Pereira	1999 - 2002	Fr. Eugene Jude Miranda	1999 - 2004
14.	Fr. Anthony Pillai	2002 - 2005	Fr. Clement Pereira	2002 - 2005
15.	Fr. Anthony Bernard Gnanapragasam Paul (Currently the Bishop of Malacca Johore Diocese. He was as appointed as Vicar General II in September 2012 by Sebastian Francis, Fifth Bishop of Roman Catholic Diocese of Penang, Malaysia, and has the title Monseigneur Bernard Paul)	2005 - October 2010	Fr. Dominic Santhiyagu; Fr. Stanley Antoni	2005-2006; 2009-20 June 2010
16.	Fr. Francis Anthony	October 2010 - 2012		
17.	Fr. Francis Andrew	2012 - 31 December 2014	Fr. Andrew Stephen	2012 - 2014
18.	Fr. Robert Daniel Francis	1 January 2015	Fr. Simon Anand Marthamuthu Deacon Sandnasamy Peter Rev. Fr. George Vaithynathan	1 Jan 2015 - 30 Sept 2018 3 March 2018 - present August 2013 - present

== Vocations from the parish ==
The Church of Our Lady of Lourdes has created numerous priests, sisters, brothers, and deacons.

=== Catholic Priests ===
No.	Priest	Year Ordained
1.	Fr. Anthony Xavier Roch	1928
2.	Fr. Andrew Francis	8 December 1934
3.	Fr. Noel Clement	3 December 1936
4.	Fr. Anthony Michael	1944
5.	Fr. Joseph Victor Anthony	11 April 1947 / 1948
6.	Fr. Ryappan Lourdes	10 March 1951
7.	Fr. Benedict Michael	1949 / 1950
8.	Fr. Xavier Emile Manikam	1958
9.	Fr. Murphy Nicholas Xavier Pakiam	10 May 1964
10.	Fr. Xavier David Anthony CSSR	19 December 1966
11.	Fr. Pathinathan Kolandasamy	22 October 1980
12.	Fr. Alexander Joseph Edwin	7 April 1976
13.	Fr. Ravi Alexander OFM	18 May 1988
14.	Fr. Anthony Pillai	14 February 1990
15.	Fr. Fabian Felix Dicom	12 June 1996
16.	Fr. Vincent Paul	7 October 1998
17.	Fr. Joe Matthews OFM	7 October 1998
18.	Fr. Michael Dass	8 September 1999
19.	Fr. Robert Daniel	8 September 1999
20.	Fr. Francis Andrew	24 May 2006
21.	Fr. George Vaithyanathan	2 February 2024

=== La Salle Brother ===
No.	Name	Post
1.	Rev. Bro. Leo Manicasami	Sub-Director of St. George Institution, Taiping, Perak

=== Religious Sisters ===
No.	Name	Congregation	Final Profession
1.	Sr Catherine of Sienna @ Mary Theressa Pillai	Franciscan Missionaries of the Divine Motherhood (FMDM)	5 November 1959
2.	Sr Rita Andrew Almeida	Franciscan Missionaries of the Divine Motherhood (FMDM)	7 February 1982
3.	Sr Bernice D'Silva	Franciscan Missionaries of the Divine Motherhood (FMDM)	13 December 1980
4.	Sr. Margaret Mary of Sacred Heart @ Mary Rosalene	Carmelite Sister (O.C.D)	
5.	Sr. St. Nicholas Dicom @ Tessie Margeret	Sisters of the Infant Jesus (I.J.S)	
6.	Sr. Aloysius Manikam @ Annie Therese	Sisters of the Infant Jesus (I.J.S)	4 January 1958
7.	Sr. Marie Joseph Francis @ Antoniammal	Sisters of the Infant Jesus (I.J.S)	4 January 1958
8.	Sr. Clement Samuel @ Mariann Samuel	Sisters of the Infant Jesus (I.J.S)	6 January 1960
9.	Sr. Clara Antoni @ Mary	Sisters of the Infant Jesus (I.J.S)	8 September 1966
10.	Sr. Bertha Antoni @ Regina	Sisters of the Infant Jesus (I.J.S)	4 January 1970
11.	Sr. Betty Andrew Almeida @ Beatrice	Sisters of the Infant Jesus (I.J.S)	30 December 1995
12.	Sr. Martha	Little Sisters of the Poor (L.S.P)	8 September 1981
13.	Sr. Marie Antoinette	Little Sisters of the Poor (L.S.P)	28 July 1981
14.	Sr. Mary Anne Jacqueline Sandanasamy	Little Sisters of the Poor (L.S.P)	20 August 1995
15.	Sr. Maureen Monteiro	Order of the Discalced Carmelites of the Blessed Virgin Mary of Mount Carmel @ Carmelites (OCD)	3 June 1995
16.	Sr. Elizabeth Jhon Jothee	Daughters of St. Paul (FSP)	15 July 2006

=== Permanent Deacon ===
No.	Name	Diaconate	Diaconate Ordination
1.	Permanent Deacon James Anthony	4 February 2006	Rt. Rev. Malcom Patrick McMohan O.P., KC*HS., at Cathedral Church of St. Barnabas, Nottingham, England.
2.	Permanent Deacon Dr. Joseph Eugene Leslie Petrus B.D.S (Madras)	1 August 2011	Rt. Rev. Monsignor Dr. Paul Tan Chee Ing S.J., S.T.L. PhD, D.D., at Cathedral of Sacred Heart, Johor Bahru, Johor, Malaysia.
3.	Permanent Deacon Sandnasamy Peter	3 March 2018	Rt. Rev. Datuk Sebastian Francis D.D., D.S.P.N., at Church of Our Lady of Lourdes, Ipoh, Perak. Malaysia.

== Papal Gold Medal "Bene Merenti" ==
The recipient of Papal Gold Medal "Bene Merenti". A meritorious medal awarded by Pope.

No.	Name	Year	Pinned
1.	Mr. A. Anthony Samy	18 November 1951	Mgr. M. Olcomendy
2.	Mr. Victor Manikam	1959	Msgr. John Gordon D.D., The Apostolic Delegate to Malaysia
3.	Mr. Mariampillay Santhiapillai Arulappu	May 1972	Mgr. Gregory Yong
4.	Mr. John Emmanuel A.M.N. @ Sambasivam	16 March 1974	Mgr. Gregory Yong
5.	Mr. A. Amaladess	16 February 1975	Mgr. Gregory Yong
6.	Mr. Robert Claude Stephens	1980	Bishop Anthony Soter Fernandez
7.	Mr. S. Arokiasamy	1980	Bishop Anthony Soter Fernandez
8.	Mr. Jerome Samuel	15 February 1999	Archbishop Luigi Bressan, The Apostolic Delegate to Malaysia
9.	Mr. S. Lourdesamy	15 February 1999	Archbishop Luigi Bressan, The Apostolic Delegate to Malaysia
10.	Mr. K. Anthonysamy	15 February 1999	Archbishop Luigi Bressan, The Apostolic Delegate to Malaysia
11.	Mr. T. Louis Raj	15 February 1999	Archbishop Luigi Bressan, The Apostolic Delegate to Malaysia

== Pro Ecclesia et Pontifice "Cross of Honour" ==
The recipient of Cross of Honour "Pro Ecclesia et Pontifice". The highest medal that can be awarded to the laity by the Pope.

No.	Name	Year	Pinned
1.	Mr. Victor Manikam	1980	
