= Sungai Ara =

- Neighbourhood of George Town
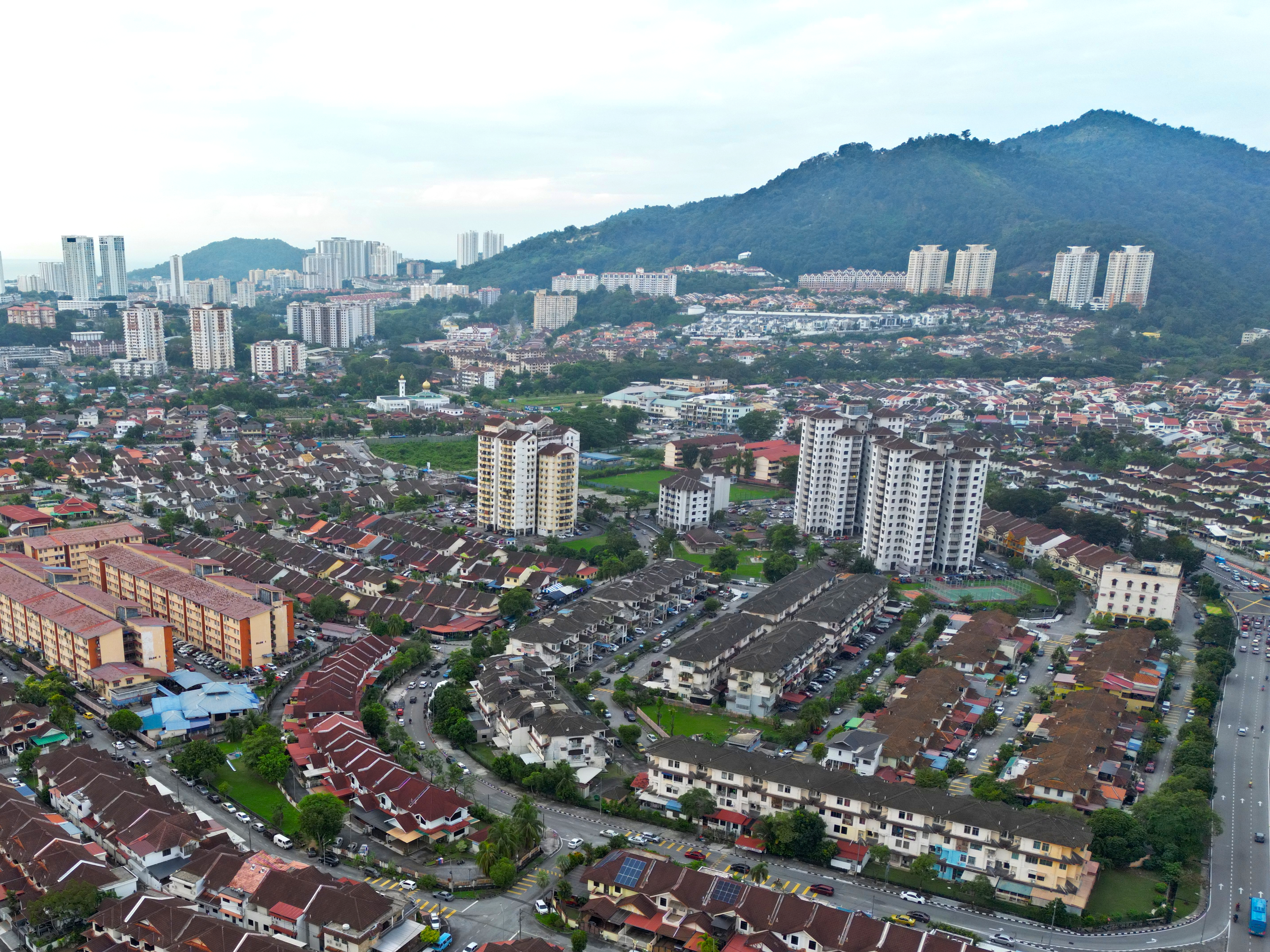

- Location within George Town in Penang
- Coordinates: 5°19′26.634″N 100°16′18.66″E
- Country: Malaysia
- State: Penang
- City: George Town
- District: Southwest
- Time zone: UTC+8 (MST)
  - Summer (DST): Not observed
- Postal code: 11900

Sungai Ara is a residential neighbourhood within the city of George Town in the Malaysian state of Penang. Located 11.9 km (7.4 mi) south of the city centre, it lies between Relau, Bayan Baru and Bayan Lepas.

== Etymology ==
Sungai Ara literally means 'fig river' in Malay; it was named after an eponymous river which flows through the area.

Residential properties at Sungai Ara

== History ==
Sungai Ara was formerly an agricultural area; to this day, the original village of Sungai Ara still stands at the intersection of Jalan Dato Ismail Hashim and Jalan Tengah. The development of Sungai Ara into a residential township only began in the late 20th century, following the creation of the adjacent Bayan Lepas Free Industrial Zone in the 1970s.

== Transportation ==
Jalan Dato Ismail Hashim and Jalan Tengah are the main thoroughfares within the neighbourhood. The former road was once known as Jalan Sungai Ara; the road was then renamed after a well-known Malaysian Quran reciter.

Rapid Penang bus routes 301, 302, 306 and 308 include stops within Sungai Ara, connecting the neighbourhood with various destinations, including Penang's capital city of George Town, the Penang International Airport, Bayan Lepas, Bayan Baru, Queensbay Mall, Setia SPICE and Teluk Kumbar.

== Sports ==
The football team of the area is Sungai Ara FC

== Education ==
Sungai Ara is served by four primary schools and a single high school.

Primary schools

- SRK Mutiara Perdana
- SRK Sungai Ara
- SRJK (C) Chong Cheng
- SRJK (T) Sungai Ara

High school

- SMK Sungai Ara

== See also ==
- Bayan Lepas
