= Diocese of Keningau =

Latin Catholic diocese in Malaysia

Coordinates: 5.3331°N 116.1540°E

Diocese of Keningau Dioecesis Keningauensis Keuskupan Keningau 根地咬教区

Catholic
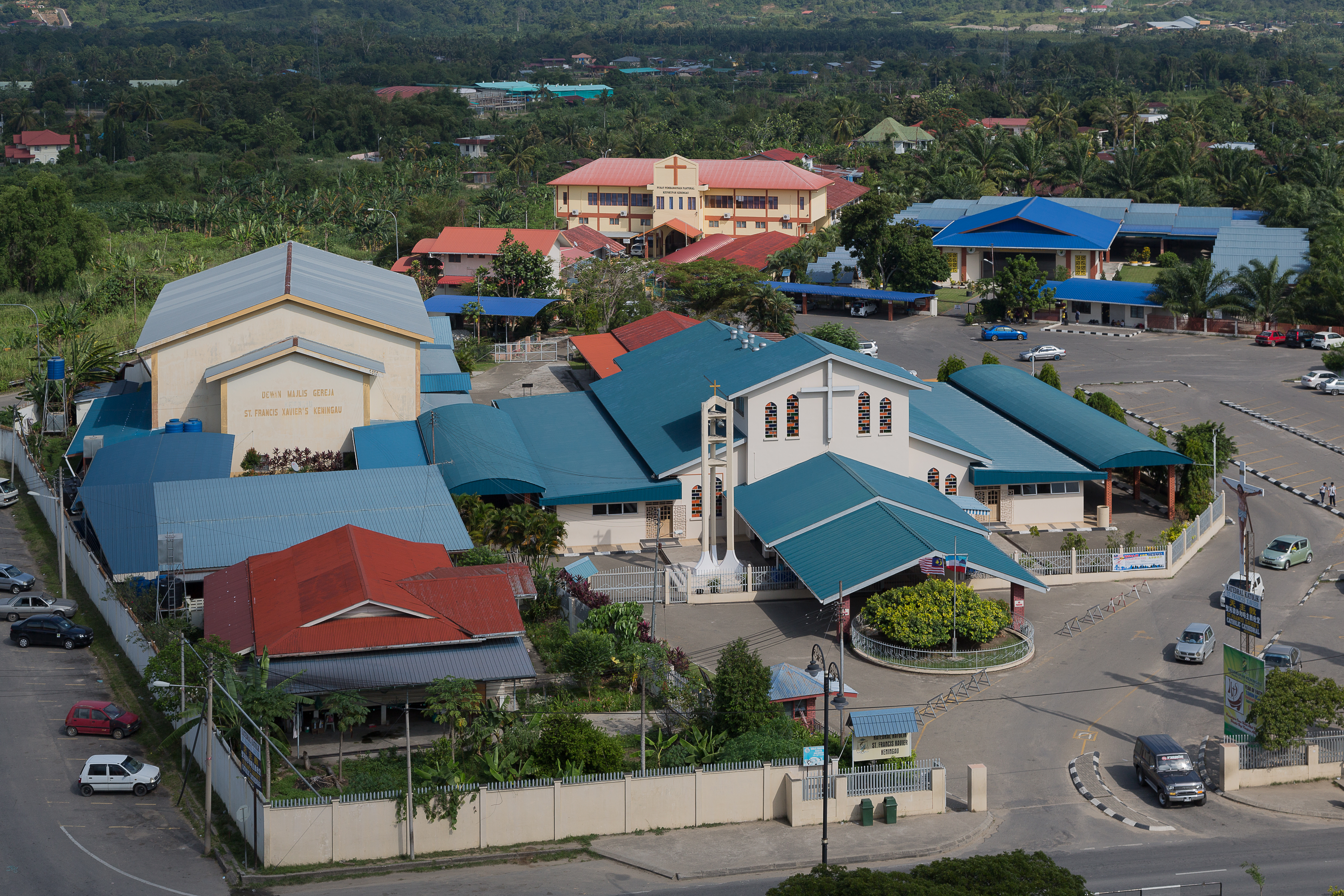
- Cathedral of St. Francis Xavier in Keningau

Location
- Country: Malaysia
- Territory: Keningau; Tenom; Sipitang; Beaufort; Tambunan; Kuala Penyu; Nabawan
- Episcopal conference: Catholic Bishops' Conference of Malaysia, Singapore and Brunei
- Ecclesiastical province: Kota Kinabalu
- Metropolitan: Kota Kinabalu

Statistics
- Area: 18,298 km^{2} (7,065 sq mi)
- Population: Total; Catholics: (as of 2020); 499,104; 146,574 (29.37%)
- Parishes: 12

Information
- Denomination: Catholic Church
- Sui iuris church: Latin Church
- Rite: Latin
- Established: 17 December 1992
- Cathedral: Cathedral of St. Francis Xavier in Keningau
- Patron saint: Francis Xavier
- Language: Ecclesiastical Latin; English language; Kadazan language; Hakka language; Dusun language; Malay language; Murut language; Mandarin language; Lundayeh language

Current leadership
- Pope: Leo XIV
- Bishop: Datuk Cornelius Piong
- Metropolitan Archbishop: Datuk John Wong Soo Kau
- Vicar General: Rev. Msgr. Gilbert Lasius Duuk (Vicar general); Rev. David Richard Gasikol, JCL (Judicial vicar)
- Episcopal Vicars: Rev. Msgr. Gilbert Engan

The Diocese of Keningau (Latin: Dioecesis Keningauensis; Malay: Keuskupan Keningau; Mandarin: 根地咬教区) is a diocese of the Latin Church of the Catholic Church in Keningau, Sabah, Malaysia. This diocese covers Sabah's interior districts of Keningau (including Sook), Nabawan (including Pensiangan, Sapulut and Pagalungan), Sipitang, Beaufort (including Membakut), Tenom (including Kemabong), Tambunan and Kuala Penyu as well as a partial extraterritoriality jurisdiction on two districts in Sabah's West Coast Division, namely in the Bongawan area of Papar district, which borders the district of Beaufort via the township of Membakut and the Kiulu area of Tuaran district that is actually allocated under the pastoral care of the Archdiocese of Kota Kinabalu; but has been allocated under the ecclesiastical purview of the Holy Cross Toboh and St Patrick's Membakut parishes of Beaufort as well as Tambunan districts within this diocese.

== History ==
Erected in 1992 by the order of papal bull "Opitulante Quidem Domino", carved from the Archdiocese of Kota Kinabalu. On 23 May 2008; the diocese became a suffragan of the newly elevated Archdiocese of Kota Kinabalu. The first bishop is the Right Reverend Datuk Cornelius Piong, appointed on 17 December 1992. There are 20 secular and 2 religious priests.

In a statement for Malaysia Day 2021, Piong issued a statement seeking the Malaysia's leadership to be "exemplary role models" in light of the county's diversity of race, culture, and religion.

== Bishops ==
No.	Portrait	Name	Period in office	Insignia
1		Cornelius Piong (born 1949)	17 December 1992 – Present	

== List of parishes ==
There are 11 parishes and 1 mission district located in the Diocese of Keningau (but two outstation churches in Tambunan district falls under the pastoral care of St. Anthony's Church, Apin-Apin which is in turn, one of the sub-parishes of St. Francis Xavier's Cathedral, Keningau namely St. Paul the Apostle's Church, Kg. Rantai as well as St Peter's Church Kg. Donggiluang, Apin-Apin Lama, Tambunan); since it is located in the border of both districts along the Keningau-Tambunan highway (which also marks the parochial boundary between the cathedral parish and St. Theresa of Lisieux's Church in Tondulu, Tambunan) as well as extraterritorial oustation churches under Holy Cross Parish, Toboh, Tambunan located in a very remote area of the Kiulu sub-district of Tuaran in the northern part of Sabah's West Coast Division which partially surrounds Tambunan district (marks the diocesan cum parochial borders between this church and St. Joseph Husband of Mary's Parish, Kiulu, Tamparuli, Tuaran, which is under the care of the Archdiocese of Kota Kinabalu), as well as St. Patrick of Ireland's Parish, Membakut, Beaufort located in the Bongawan area of Papar district in the southern part of Sabah's West Coast Division, along the border of the Papar as well as Beaufort districts, which also marks the boundary between the West Coast and Interior divisions of Sabah state (also marks the diocesan borders between this diocese and the Kota Kinabalu Archdiocese, between the borders of the parishes between this church and St. Joseph the Worker's Parish in Papar).

- St. Francis Xavier's Cathedral Parish, Keningau (69 outstations)
  - sub-parishes of Our Lady Queen of Peace Church, Bariawa Tengah, Keningau
  - Our Lady of Lourdes Church/Nulu Sosopon Holy Family Diocesan Pilgrimage and Retreat Centre, Agudon, Keningau
  - St. Raymond's Church, Bulu Silou, Keningau
  - St. Dominic's Church, Linsosod/Liawan, Keningau
  - St. Blasius' Church, Magatang, Keningau
  - St. Paul the Apostle's Church Biah Skim, Ansip, Keningau
  - St. Mary's Church, Bingkor, Keningau
  - St. John's Church, Senagang, Keningau
  - St. Anne's Church, Meninipir, Keningau
  - Our Lady of Lourdes Church, Kitung, Keningau
  - St. Joseph's Church, Menawo, Keningau
  - St. John's Church, Biah, Keningau
  - St. Gabriel the Archangel's Church, Ansip, Keningau
  - St. John the Baptist's Church, Ambual, Keningau
  - St. Francis of Assisi's Church Tagai, Apin-Apin, Keningau
  - St. John the Evangelist's Church, Panui, Keningau
  - Maria Rani Tobitua (Holy Mary Mother of God) Church, Linsudan, Keningau
  - St. Paul's Church, Luanti Baru, Keningau
  - St. Joseph's Church, Sigapon, Keningau
  - St. Mary's Church Kepayan Baru, Apin-Apin, Keningau
  - St. Bede's Church Pangas, Apin-Apin, Keningau
  - Holy Family Church Gasabon, Apin-Apin, Keningau
  - St. Paul's Church Baginda, Bingkor, Keningau
  - Diocesan Retreat House Tuarid Taud, Tatal, Keningau
  - St. Augustine of Hippo's Church, Ria, Keningau
  - St. Philip's Church, Tigot, Keningau
  - St. Bernardette's Church Binaong, Bingkor, Keningau
  - St. Mary's Church, Toboh Laut, Keningau
  - St. Thomas' Church, Kuangoh, Keningau
  - Holy Family Church, Patikang Ulu, Keningau
  - St. Fabian's Church, Tonobon Baru/Bunga Raya, Keningau
  - St. David's Church, Liau Darat/Liau Ulu, Keningau
  - St. Anthony's Church, Apin-Apin, Keningau
  - St. Gabriel the Archangel's Church Kirokot Baru, Apin-Apin, Keningau
  - St. Edward the Confessor's Church, Melidang, Keningau
  - St. Peter's Church, Sodomon, Keningau
  - St. Michael the Archangel's Church, Pantai Baru, Keningau
  - St. Paul's Church, Toboh Baru, Keningau
  - St. John's Church, Bomboi, Keningau
  - Holy Spirit Church, Tohan Baru/Merampong, Keningau
  - St. Michael the Archangel's Church, Kindasan, Keningau
  - St. John's Church Kiporing, Menawo, Keningau
  - St. Francis de Sales' Church, Pamalan, Keningau
  - St. John's Church, Jaya Baru, Keningau
  - Divine Mercy/St. Mariana's Church, Patikang Laut, Keningau
  - St. Stephen's Church, Liau Tengah, Keningau
  - St. Emmanuel's Church Naukab, Apin-Apin, Keningau
  - St. Peter's Church Donggiluang, Apin-Apin Lama, Tambunan
  - St. Paul's Church Rantai, Apin-Apin Lama, Tambunan
  - Holy Family Church, Bukit Merah, Keningau
  - St. Maria Goretti's Church, Gaulan, Keningau
  - St. Monica's Church, Baitah, Keningau
  - St. Isidore's Church, Tombotuon Baru, Keningau
  - Emmanuel Church, Libodon, Keningau
  - St. George's Church, Mempulut, Keningau
  - St. David's Church, Kahaba, Keningau
  - St. Anne's Church Inandung, Ansip/Dalit, Keningau
  - St. Dominic's Church Dalit, Ansip, Keningau
  - Divine Mercy Church, Kalampun, Keningau
  - St. John's Church, Malaing, Keningau
  - St. Joseph's Church, Lumiri Tengah, Keningau
  - St. Peter's Church, Panagatan, Keningau
  - St. James the Apostle's Church Bunsit, Bingkor, Keningau
  - St. John's Church Mongitom Ulu, Bunga Raya, Keningau
  - St. Mark the Evangelist's Church Kampung Baru, Bunga Raya, Keningau and
  - St. Edwin of Northumbria's Church Belinin, Ansip/Dalit, Keningau
- St. Valentine's Parish, Beaufort (10 outstations)/St. John the Baptist's Parish, Sipitang
  - sub-parishes of St. Zeno, Mile 58, Beaufort
  - St. Boniface, Mile 60, Beaufort
  - St. Simon, Saliwangan Baru, Beaufort
  - Christ the King, Mile 70, Beaufort
  - St. Michael the Archangel, Mile 6 1/2, Lumadan, Beaufort
  - St. Joseph, Laboi, Beaufort
  - St. Thomas, Takuli, Beaufort
  - St. John the Apostle, Kiulu Baru, Beaufort and
  - Divine Mercy, Lumat Laut, Beaufort
- St. Peter's Parish, Bundu, Kuala Penyu (18 outstations)
  - sub-parishes of St. Joseph's Church, Kabunau/Menumpang, Kuala Penyu
  - Church of Saints Simon and Jude, Kalanggaan/Bosusung, Kuala Penyu
  - St. Francis of Assisi's Church (Franciscan House of Prayer), Jangkit/Sawangan, Kuala Penyu
  - St. Stephen's Church, Kiaru, Kuala Penyu
  - St. Ambrose's Church, Menumbok, Kuala Penyu
  - St. Henry's Church, Kekapor/Batu Abai, Kuala Penyu
  - St. Catherine of Siena's Church, Menunggang, Kuala Penyu
  - Christ the Good Shepherd Church, Ginantungan, Kuala Penyu
  - St. Luke the Apostle's Church, Motiwog, Kuala Penyu
  - St. John of the Cross Church, Gana, Kuala Penyu
  - St. Mary's Church, Kaparing, Kuala Penyu
  - St. Simon the Zealot's Church/St. Theresa of Lisieux's Diocesan Retreat Centre, Purun, Kuala Penyu
  - St. Gabriel the Archangel's Church, Kakaporan, Kuala Penyu
  - St. Paul's Church, Batu Linting, Kuala Penyu
  - St. Augustine's Church, Kiambor, Kuala Penyu
  - St. John the Apostle's Church, Kabatung/Kudot, Kuala Penyu
  - Christ the Saviour Church, Janang, Kuala Penyu (formerly Our Lady of the Rosary, Janang) and
  - St. Thomas Becket's Church, Kelampun/Kilugus, Kuala Penyu
- St. Patrick's Parish, Membakut, Beaufort (6 outstations)
  - sub-parishes of St. Philip's Church, Sinuko, Membakut, Beaufort
  - St. Thomas' Church, Poring, Membakut, Beaufort
  - St. Peter's Church, Penompok, Membakut, Beaufort
  - St. Augustine of Hippo's Church, Tamalang, Membakut, Beaufort (formerly St. Paul's Church, Tamalang)
  - St. Veronica's Church, Tiong, Membakut, Beaufort
  - St. Jude's Church, Ulu Lumagar, Bongawan, Papar
  - St. Mary's Church, Paung, Membakut, Beaufort and
  - Christ the King Church, Dungau, Membakut, Beaufort
- Holy Spirit Parish, Sook, Keningau/St. Bede's Mission District, Nabawan (47 outstations)
  - sub-parishes of St. Michael the Archangel's Church, Pensiangan, Nabawan
  - St. Catherine of Siena's Church Tumura, Pensiangan, Nabawan
  - St. Bernardine of Siena Church, Salong, Pensiangan, Nabawan
  - St. Mark the Evangelist Church, Tantayakan, Sapulut, Nabawan
  - St. Joseph's Church, Pandiwan, Nabawan
  - St. Maria Goretti's Church, Sinjaya, Nabawan
  - Sts. Peter and Paul's Church, Pemunterian, Nabawan
  - Assumption of Our Lady Church, Tetagas, Nabawan
  - St. Isidore's Church, Pangaraan, Nabawan
  - St. Mary Magdalene's Church, Tiulon, Sook, Keningau
  - St. Joseph's Church, Maatol, Tiulon, Sook, Keningau
  - Sacred Heart of Jesus Church, Mototou, Tiulon, Sook, Keningau
  - St. Paul's Church/Mother Mary of the Cross Chapel (Chapel Baloi Bonda Maria Nuluh Salib Tobitua), Rancangan Belia, Tiulon, Sook, Keningau
  - St. John Vianney's Church, Simbuan, Sook, Keningau
  - Mother Mary/Our Lady of Rosary Church, Karamatoi/Dumbun, Sook, Keningau
  - St. John Baptist De La Salle's Church, Mokotog, Sook, Keningau
  - All Angels' Church, Seselungon/Nandangan, Sook, Keningau
  - St. Stephen's Church, Sinaron, Sook, Keningau
  - St. Andrew the Apsotle Church, Delayan Lama, Sook, Keningau
  - St. Ignatius' Church, Delayan Baru, Sook, Keningau
  - St. Faustina Kowalska's Church, Kionsom Baru, Sook, Keningau
  - Holy Trinity Church, Tuaran Baru, Sook, Keningau
  - St. Emmanuel's Church, Tinagalan, Sook, Keningau
  - St. Paul's Church, Bunang, Sook, Keningau
  - St. Peter's Church, Kabatang Baru, Sook, Keningau
  - St. Paul Miki's Church, Sinaron Tengah, Sook, Keningau
  - Our Lady of Fatima Church, Kilugus, Sook, Keningau
  - Christ the King Church, Tulid, Sook, Keningau
  - All Saints Church, Kebulu, Sook, Keningau
  - St. Clare of Assisi's Church, Lintuhun Baru, Sook, Keningau
  - St. Mary's Church, Namadan Baru, Sook, Keningau
  - All Angels' Church, Barasanon, Sook, Keningau
  - St. Thomas Aquinas' Church, Koposion, Sook, Keningau
  - St. Theresa's Church, Pulutan, Sook, Keningau
  - Our Lady of Perpetual Help Church, Kiulu Baru, Sook, Keningau (formerly Our Lady of Rosary Church, Kiulu Baru)
  - St. Edward the Confessor Church, Batu Lunguyan, Sook, Keningau
  - St. Peter Faber's Church, Lanas, Sook, Keningau
  - St. Anthony of Padua Church Pinipi, Lanas, Sook, Keningau
  - St. John the Baptist Church Kilo, Lanas, Sook, Keningau
  - St. Francis of Assisi Church, Sinua, Sook, Keningau (formerly Holy Family Church, Sinua)
  - Mother Mary Church, Simpang Empat, Sook, Keningau
  - St. Fidelis of Sigmaringen Church, Bonod, Sook, Keningau
  - St. Michael the Archangel Church, Papar Baru, Sook, Keningau
  - Risen Christ (Kristus Nokotungag) Church, Menanti, Sook, Keningau
  - Holy Family Church, Mansiat, Sook, Keningau and
  - Divine Mercy Church, Bahagia, Nabawan
- St. Theresa of Lisieux's Parish, Tondulu, Tambunan (16 outstations)
  - sub-parishes of St. Frances Cabrini's Church, Nambayan, Tambunan
  - St. Joseph the Worker's Church, Ragkam/Kuyungon/Mogong/Kasalasan/Papar, Tambunan
  - Sts. Anne and Joachim's Church, Dabata/Tabilung/Daar, Tambunan
  - St. David's Church, Monsorulung, Tambunan
  - Holy Family Church, Kuala Monsok, Tambunan
  - St. Joachim of Nazareth's Church, Lintuhun/Laab/Karanaan, Tambunan
  - St. Linus' Church, Monsok Tengah, Tambunan
  - Father Abraham's (Bapa Abraham) Church Purutan, Monsorulung, Tambunan
  - St. Stephen's Church, Monsok Ulu, Tambunan
  - St. Luke the Evangelist's Church, Tikolod, Tambunan
  - St. Michael the Archangel Church, Ulu Tikolod, Tambunan
  - Catholic Chapel Movement Room/Gethsemane Garden Retreat Centre, Kiawayan, Tambunan
  - St. Peter's Church, Mangkatai, Tambunan
  - Carmelite Monastery Chapel (CSE)/St. Mary Magdalene's Church, Kaingaran, Tambunan
  - St. Paul's Church, Dalungan/Nandal, Tambunan
  - Christ the King Church Sungoi, Nambayan, Tambunan
  - St. John the Baptist's Church, Rompon, Tambunan
  - St. Anthony's Church, Lotong, Tambunan
  - Holy Spirit (Spiritu Sangti) Church, Kitou, Tambunan
  - St. Mary's Church Dakar, Rompon, Tambunan
  - St. Veronica's Church Rugading/Tanaki, Nambayan, Tambunan and
  - St. John Bosco's Church, Ladang MESEJ Kaingaran, Tambunan
- Holy Cross Parish Toboh, Tambunan (20 outstations)
  - sub-parishes of Kristus Nokotungag (Risen Christ) Church, Tombotuon/Ranggom/Kapayan, Tambunan
  - St. Anthony's Church, Patau, Tambunan
  - Divine Mercy Church, Makatip/Rugading, Tambunan
  - St. Peter's Church, Kusob, Tambunan
  - St. John's Church, Kuala Namadan, Tambunan
  - Immaculate Heart of Mary Church, Libang/Pahu, Tambunan
  - Blessed Sacrament Church, Kirokot, Tambunan
  - Mary Help of Christians Church, Timbou/Sukung, Tambunan
  - Spiritu Tobitua (Holy Spirit) Church, Sunsuron, Tambunan
  - St. John's Church, Romokon Lama, Kiulu, Tuaran
  - St. Paul's Church, Poring, Kiulu, Tuaran
  - St. Paul's Church, Romokon Baru, Kiulu, Tuaran
  - St. Joseph's Church, Garas, Tambunan
  - St. Anthony's Church, Sintuong-Tuong, Tambunan
  - St. Martin's Church, Tampasak, Tambunan
  - Christ the King's Church, Bambangan, Tambunan
  - Holy Trinity Church Tiang, Tonop, Tambunan
  - St. Rose of Lima's Church Sinungkalangan, Bambangan, Tambunan
  - Our Lady of the Rosary Church, Widu, Tambunan
  - St. Matthew the Apostle's Church, Tontolob Liwan, Tambunan and
  - St. Anthony's Church, Tiong Widu, Tambunan
- St. Anthony of Padua's Parish (16 outstations)/Immaculate Heart of Mary Parish Kemabong, Tenom (15 outstations)
  - sub-parishes of Our Lady of Perpetual Help, Kemabong, Tenom (Formerly Land of Our Lady, Kemabong)
  - St. Mary, Melalap, Tenom
  - St. Simon the Zealot, Paal, Tenom
  - Holy Family, Gumisi, Kemabong, Tenom
  - St. Peter, Kuala Paitan, Kemabong, Tenom
  - St. Simon the Zealot, Tatau, Kemabong, Tenom
  - Holy Trinity, Tolokoson, Kemabong, Tenom
  - St. Thomas, Mamaitom, Kemabong, Tenom
  - St. Paul, Bangkulin, Kemabong, Tenom
  - St. Jude, Kaparungan, Kemabong, Tenom
  - St. Michael the Archangel, Kuala Tomani, Kemabong, Tenom
  - St. Damian, Inubai/Ponontomon, Tenom
  - St. Joseph, Batu-Batu, Tenom
  - St. John the Apostle, Mandalom/Barung, Tenom
  - St. Veronica, Paguokon, Tenom (Formerly Holy Trinity, Paguokon)
  - Our Lady of the Rosary, Batu Tiningkang, Tenom
  - St. Martha of Bethany, Lagud, Tenom
  - St. Mary Magdalene, Pulong, Melalap, Tenom
  - St. Paul, Pagansangon, Melalap, Tenom
  - St. Peter, Pamilaan, Tenom
  - St. Francis of Assisi, Pangalat, Melalap, Tenom
  - Church of the Risen Christ, Tipoh, Tenom
  - St. Joseph, Sigapon, Tenom
  - St. Thomas, Mongool, Pamilaan, Tenom
  - St. Anne, Sugiang Lama, Kemabong, Tenom
  - St. John Vianney, Pamaluyan, Kemabong, Tenom and
  - St. Michael the Archangel, Pangi, Tenom

== Clergy ==
=== Bishop ===
Datuk Cornelius Piong, DD.

=== Permanently based priests ===
St. Francis Xavier's Cathedral Parish, Keningau (KSFX)

- Rector: Msgr. Gilbert Lasius Duuk
- Assistant Rector(s): Fr. Bede Anthonius Balunting, Fr. Francis Dakun, Fr. Philip Muji and Fr. Joseph Kondu Gapitang

St. Valentine's Parish, Beaufort/St. John the Baptist's Parish, Sipitang

- Rector: Msgr. Gilbert Engan
- Assistant Rector(s): Fr. Kennedy Nakudah Kilin

St. Peter's Parish Bundu, Kuala Penyu

- Rector: Fr. Roney Mailap
- Assistant Rector(s): Fr. Paul Mikin

St Patrick's Parish, Membakut, Beaufort

- Rector: Fr. Boniface Kimsin
- Assistant Rector(s): Fr. Appolonius Yakis, CSE

Holy Spirit Parish Sook, Keningau

- Rector: Fr. Bede Morti
- Assistant Rector(s): Fr. Anthony Clarence Mikat, Fr. Bonaventure Unting and Fr. David Mamat

St. Theresa of Lisieux's Parish, Tondulu, Tambunan

- Rector: Fr. Rudolf Joannes
- Assistant Rector(s): Fr. Sharbel Kevin Francisco Joseph Sambikol, CSE

Holy Cross Parish, Toboh, Tambunan

- Rector: Fr. David Richard Gasikol
- Assistant Rector(s): Fr. Giovanni Chrysostomus Sugau, CSE

St. Anthony of Padua's Parish/Immaculate Heart of Mary Parish Kemabong, Tenom

- Rector: Fr. Nelbart Peter
- Assistant Rector(s): Fr. Harry Dorisoh and Fr. Benedict Daulis Runsab

St. Bede's Mission District, Nabawan

- Administrator: Fr. Ronnie Luni

==== Priests of Keningau ====
- Msgr. Gilbert Lasius Duuk (Vicar general)
- Msgr. Gilbert Engan (Vicar general emeritus)
- Fr. David Richard Gasikol, JCL (Judicial vicar)
- Fr. Anthony Clarence Mikat
- Fr. Appolonius Yakis, CSE
- Fr. Bede Anthonius Balunting
- Fr. Bede Morti Lamutan
- Fr. Benedict Daulis Runsab (Outstationed from Archdiocese of Kota Kinabalu)
- Fr. Bernard Marie, CSE
- Fr. Bonaventure Jausi Unting
- Fr. Boniface Kimsin
- Fr. Brywinedren Godon
- Fr. Dr. Charles Chiew
- Fr. Clement Abel Anggas
- Fr. Cosmas Francis Yasun, OFM
- Fr. David Mamat
- Fr. Dominico Evan Lasius Duuk, CSE
- Fr. Francis Dakun
- Fr. Gilbert James Augustine Janggul, OFM Cap
- Fr. Giovanni Chrysostomus Sugau, CSE (Outstationed from Archdiocese of Kota Kinabalu)
- Fr. Harry Dorisoh
- Fr. Joseph Kondu Gapitang
- Fr. Kennedy Nakudah Kilin
- Fr. Lazarus Uhin
- Fr. Nalerin Erone Nahfirin, SJ
- Fr. Nelbart Peter
- Fr. Paul Mikin
- Fr. Philip Muji
- Fr. Roney Mailap
- Fr. Ronnie Alfred Luni
- Fr. Rudolf Michael Rayner Sagulu, CSE
- Fr. Rudolf Joannes
- Fr. Sharbel Kevin Francisco Joseph Sambikol, CSE
- Fr. Sixtus Pitah Amit, OFM
- Fr. Valentine Gompuk, OFM Cap
- Fr. William Nelson Evarinus Sipalan, OFM

=== Foreign Priests ===
- Fr. Laurensius Malvin Renwarin (Outstationed from Diocese of Amboina, Indonesia)

=== Transitional Deacons ===
- N/A

=== Seminarians of Keningau ===
- Brother Constantine Nicholas Ollot Gohol
- Brother Larry Misol
- Brother Marcilus Philip
- Brother Randall Lee Ken Haw, OFM Cap

=== Priests Outstationed/On Study Leave ===
- Fr. Cosmas Francis Yasun, OFM (Diocese of Malacca-Johor)
- Fr. Dominico Evan Lasius Duuk, CSE (Church of the Holy Name of Jesus, Balik Pulau, Penang)
- Fr. Valentine Gompuk, OFM Cap (Quezon City, Philippines)
- Fr. Francis Dakun (St. Peter's College Major Seminary, Kuching, Sarawak)
- Fr. Gilbert James Augustine Janggul, OFM Cap (Church of the Risen Christ, Air Itam, Penang)
- Fr. William Nelson Evarinus Sipalan, OFM (Church of St. Ann, 10th mile, Kuching-Serian Highway, Kota Padawan, Kuching, Sarawak)
- Fr. Nalerin Erone Nahfirin, SJ (Jesuit mission in Spain)
- Fr. Sixtus Pitah Amit, OFM (Sacred Heart Cathedral, Johor Bahru, Johor)
- Brother Larry Misol (St. Peter's College Major Seminary, Kuching, Sarawak)
- Brother Randall Lee Ken Haw, OFM Cap (Sacred Heart Catherdral, Sibu, Sarawak)

=== Deceased Priests ===
- Fr. Alberto Irenus David, SJ (1967-2025)

== Religious orders ==
- Order of Friars Minor Capuchin (OFM Cap)
- Order of Friars Minor (OFM)
- Society of Jesus (SJ)
- Friars of Prophet Elijah / Carmelitae Sancti Eliae (CSE)
- Carmelite Sisters / Puteri Carmel (PC)
- Infant Jesus Sisters (IJS)
- Poor Clare Sisters / Poor Clares (PCS)
- Secular Institute of Betania Community (ISKB)

== Missionary schools ==
=== Primary ===
- SK St. Francis Xavier, Keningau
- SK St. John, Beaufort
- SK St. Stephen Kiaru, Kuala Penyu
- SK St. Anthony, Tenom
- SK St. Joseph Kabunau, Kuala Penyu
- SK St. Pius Pamilaan, Tenom
- SK St. James Apin-Apin, Keningau
- SK St. Patrick, Membakut, Beaufort
- SRK St. Theresa Tondulu, Tambunan
- SK St. Augustine Kiambor, Kuala Penyu
- SK St. David Toboh, Tambunan
- SK St. Peter Bundu, Kuala Penyu

=== Secondary ===
- SMK St. Francis Xavier, Keningau
- SM St. Martin Tampasak, Tambunan
- SM St. Anthony, Tenom
- SM St. John, Beaufort
- SMK St. Patrick, Membakut, Beaufort

== See also ==
- Catholic Church in Malaysia
- List of Catholic dioceses in Malaysia
