= Alfred Loisy =

French theologian

The Reverend Alfred Loisy
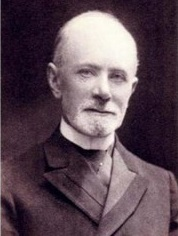
- Born: Alfred Firmin Loisy; 28 February 1857; Ambrières, Second French Empire (now France)
- Died: 1 June 1940 (aged 83); Ceffonds, Zone occupée, German Reich (now France)
- Occupations: Priest, professor, theologian
- Years active: 1879–1931
- Known for: Founder of Modernism in the Roman Catholic Church

Academic background
- Education: Catholic University of Paris

Academic work
- Institutions: Catholic University of Paris, École pratique des hautes études, University of Paris, Collège de France
- Notable works: (See list below)
- Influenced: Alec Vidler

Alfred Firmin Loisy (French: [lwazi]) (28 February 1857 – 1 June 1940) was a French Catholic priest, theologian, and academic, generally regarded as one of the leading figures of the modernist movement within the Catholic Church. He was a critic of traditional views on the interpretation of the Bible, and argued that the methods of modern biblical criticism could aid theology. He famously wrote that "Jesus announced the kingdom, and it is the Church that came".

Loisy's views brought him into conflict with the Catholic hierarchy, including Popes Leo XIII and Pius X. In 1893, he was dismissed from his position as professor of the Catholic University of Paris. Several of his works were placed in the Index of Forbidden Books, and in 1908 he was formally excommunicated. He was never reconciled with the Church, and from 1909 to 1932 he held the chair of history of religions at the Collège de France. He also taught at the École pratique des hautes études and at the Faculty of Letters of the University of Paris, and was made an officer of the Legion of Honour in 1932.

== Education ==
Born on 28 February 1857 at Ambrières, Loisy was put into the ecclesiastical school of Saint-Dizier at four years old. He decided for the priesthood and was educated from 1874 to 1879 at the Grand séminaire de Châlons-en-Champagne; he entered the Institut Catholique de Paris in 1878/1879. Prior to his ordination to the subdiaconate, he had experienced doubts regarding the soundness of the Catholic faith. After an illness he returned to the Institut and was ordained a priest on 29 June 1879. Initially assigned parish work, in 1881 he requested to be reassigned to the Institut to complete his baccalauréat in theology. That autumn he became instructor in Hebrew. From 1882 to 1885 he took additional courses in Hebrew with Ernest Renan at the Collège de France, and began teaching Assyrian in 1886. He was also influenced, as to biblical languages and textual criticism, by the Abbé Paulin Martin, and as to a consciousness of the biblical problems and a sense of form by the historical intuition and irony of Abbé Louis Duchesne. He took his theological degree in March 1890, by the oral defense of forty Latin scholastic theses and by a French dissertation, Histoire du canon de l'ancien testament, published as his first book in that year.

== Early Biblical criticism ==
Some of his work appeared in the bi-monthly L'Enseignement biblique, a periodical written throughout and published by himself. In November 1893, Loisy published the last lecture of his course, in which he summed up his position on Biblical criticism in five propositions: the Pentateuch was not the work of Moses, the first five chapters of Genesis were not literal history, the New Testament and the Old Testament did not possess equal historical value, there was a development in scriptural doctrine, and Biblical writings were subject to the same limitations as those by other authors of the ancient world. This resulted in Loisy's dismissal from his teaching position. A few days later Pope Leo XIII published the encyclical Providentissimus Deus, which indirectly condemned Abbé Loisy's and Mgr. d'Hulst's position, and rendered the continued publication of consistently critical work so difficult that Loisy himself suppressed his Enseignement at the end of 1893.

== Historical apologetics for the development of the Catholic Church ==
His 1908 Les Évangiles Synoptiques would cause his excommunication. In his works he argued against the views of Adolf von Harnack, the German Lutheran theologian, who was trying to show that it was necessary and inevitable for the Catholic Church to form as it did. In doing so, Loisy implicitly accepted the eschatology of Johannes Weiss (this eschatology is named consistent eschatology): Jesus thought the coming of the Kingdom was imminent, so there was no point in founding a Church. Only after his death and resurrection was his original proclamation of the Kingdom transformed into this sense by his disciples, and legitimately so, as Loisy pointed out against Harnack's conception of Christianity:

It is certain, for instance, that Jesus did not systematize beforehand the constitution of the Church as that of a government established on earth and destined to endure for a long series of centuries. But a conception far more foreign still to His thoughts and to His authentic teaching is that of an invisible society formed for ever of those who have in their hearts faith in the goodness of God [Harnack]. We have seen that the gospel of Jesus already contained a rudiment of social organization, and that the Kingdom also was announced as a society. Jesus foretold the Kingdom, and it was the Church that came; she came, enlarging the form of the gospel, which it was impossible to preserve as it was, as soon as the Passion closed the ministry of Jesus. There is no institution on the earth or in history whose status and value may not be questioned if the principle is established that nothing may exist except in its original form. Such a principle is contrary to the law of life, which is movement and a continual effort of adaptation to conditions always new and perpetually changing. Christianity has not escaped this law, and cannot be reproached for submission to it. It could not do otherwise than it has done.

The second part of the quotation echoes Cardinal Newman's theory on the development of Christian doctrine which Loisy had studied in his time at Neuilly. Although L'Évangile et L'Église in particular was condemned by Cardinal Richard, Pope Leo consistently refused to interfere directly. It was his successor, Pope Pius X who would later condemn these works.

Another controversial thesis of Loisy, developed in La Religion d'Israël, is the distinction between a pre-Moses period, when the Hebrews worshipped the god El, also known by the plural of this name, Elohim, and a later stage, when Yahweh gradually became the only deity of the Jews.

== Pope Pius X ==
Cardinal Sarto became Pope Pius X on 4 August 1903. On 1 October, Loisy published three new books, Autour d'un petit livre, Le Quatrième Évangile and Le Discours sur la Montagne (a fragment of a proposed enlarged commentary on the Synoptic Gospels). Autour consists of seven letters on different topics addressed to church leaders and friends. Urged by the Parisian Archbishop Cardinal Richard, Pius X transferred the scrutiny of Loisy's books, started under Leo XIII in 1901 under the Congregation of the Index, to the Holy Office. By 23 December 1903, the Congregation censured Loisy's main exegetical works: Religion d'Israël, L'Évangile et l'Église, Études évangéliques, Autour d'un petit livre and Le Quatrième Évangile.

=== Condemnation ===
On 12 January 1904 Loisy wrote to the Vatican Secretary of State, Cardinal Merry del Val, that he received the condemnation with respect, and condemned whatever might be reprehensible in his books, whilst reserving the rights of his conscience and his opinions as an historian. The Holy See was not satisfied, and Loisy sent three further declarations; the last, dispatched on 17 March, was addressed to the pope himself, and remained unanswered. At the end of March, Loisy gave up his lectureship, as he declared, on his own initiative. In April 1907 he returned to his native Lorraine, to his relatives in Ceffonds near Montier-en-Der.

In 1904 the Holy Office began to compile a syllabus of errors in the works of Loisy. Due to ongoing internal resistance, especially from the Master of the Sacred Palace, the papal theologian Alberto Lepidi, this syllabus was published only in July 1907 as the decree Lamentabili sane exitu (or "A Lamentable Departure Indeed"); it condemned sixty-five propositions from the field of biblical interpretation and the history of dogma. They concerned the nature of the church, revelation, biblical exegesis, the sacraments, and the divinity of Christ. This was soon followed by the encyclical Pascendi dominici gregis ("Feeding the Lord's Flock"), which characterized modernism as the "synthesis of all heresies". The documents made Loisy realise that there was no hope for reconciliation of his views with official Catholic doctrine. He made a comparative study of the papal documents to show the condemned propositions in his own writings. He also asserted as true many of his earlier New Testament interpretations, which previously he had formulated in conditional form. In his diary he wrote:

Christ has even less importance in my religion than he does in that of the liberal Protestants: for I attach little importance to the revelation of God the Father for which they honor Jesus. If I am anything in religion, it is more pantheist-positivist-humanitarian than Christian.

— Mémoires II, p. 397

His Catholic critics commented that his religious system envisioned a great society which he believed to be the historically developed Church. For many, the attitude of Loisy and his followers was incomprehensible. While Modernists asked, "How can the Church survive?", for Pius X the question was, "How can these men be priests?"

The censure did not deter Loisy from publishing three further books. Les Évangiles synoptiques, two large volumes of 1,009 and 798 pages, appeared in January 1908. This contains a detailed commentary on the Synoptic Gospels, combining the ecclesiastical tradition, modern criticism, the Gospel narrative, and the tradition of the text and the previous commentaries. The commentary also contains a careful translation of the texts. Loisy recognizes two eye-witness documents, as utilized by all three Gospels. He traces a strong Pauline influence, especially in the Gospel of Mark. Yet the great bulk of the sayings are acknowledged as substantially authentic; if the historicity of certain words and acts is here denied with unusual assurance, that of other sayings and deeds is established with stronger proofs; and the redemptive conception of the Passion and the sacramental interpretation of the Last Supper are found to spring up promptly and legitimately from Christ's work and words.

The third book, Simples Réflexions sur le décret Lamentabili et sur l'encyclique Pascendi (277 pages), was published from Ceffonds a few days after the commentary. Each proposition of the decree is carefully tracked to its probable source, and is often found to modify the latter's meaning. The study of the encyclical concludes: "Time is the great teacher […] we would do wrong to despair either of our civilization or of the Church."

The ecclesiastical authorities were not slow to act. On 14 February 1908 Léon-Adolphe Amette, archbishop of Paris, prohibited his diocesans to read or defend the two books, which "attack and deny several fundamental dogmas of Christianity," under pain of excommunication.

=== Excommunication ===
Loisy was excommunicated vitandus on 7 March 1908.

After his excommunication Loisy became a secular intellectual. In 1909 he was appointed Chair of History of Religions in the Collège de France under the largely secular Third Republic, and served there until retiring in 1931. In that post, he continued to develop his philosophy, describing the Christian religion as a humanist system of ethics rather than a divinely instituted one. He also developed his studies of early religions and their influence on Christianity. He never recanted, and died in 1940 in Ceffonds.

== Writings ==
- Loisy, Alfred (1898). "le développement Chrétienne d'après le Cardinal Newman". Revue du clergé français. 17. hdl:2027/hvd.hnhkq4. - Written under the pseudonym A. Firmin, Eng. trans in Talar 2010
- Loisy, Alfred (1899). "la théorie individualiste de la religion". Revue du clergé français. 17. hdl:2027/hvd.hnhkq4. - Written under the pseudonym A. Firmin, Eng. trans in Talar 2010
- Loisy, Alfred (1899). "la définition de la religion". Revue du clergé français. 18. hdl:2027/hvd.hnhkqt. - Written under the pseudonym A. Firmin, Eng. trans in Talar 2010
- Loisy, Alfred (1900). "l'idée de révélation". Revue du clergé français. 21. hdl:2027/hvd.hnhksx. - Written under the pseudonym A. Firmin, Eng. trans in Talar 2010
- Loisy, Alfred (1900). "les preuves et l'économie de la revelation". Revue du clergé français. 22. hdl:2027/hvd.hnhks8. - Written under the pseudonym A. Firmin, Eng. trans in Talar 2010
- Loisy, Alfred (1901). La religion d'Israël. Paris: Letouzey et Ané. OCLC 878165012.
- ——— (1902). L'Evangile et l'Eglise. Paris: Picard. OCLC 901987393.
- ——— (1903). Autour d'un petit livre. Paris: Alphonse Picard et fils. OCLC 40018527.
- ——— (1903). The Gospel and the Church. Translated by Home, Christopher. London: Isbister & Company. OCLC 494580825. - Eng. trans. of L'Evangile et l'Eglise
- ——— (1907). Les évangiles synoptiques. Ceffonds: Chez l'Auteur. OCLC 180079925.
- ——— (1910). Religion of Israel. Translated by Galton, Arthur. London: T. Fisher Unwin. OCLC 924251280. - Eng. trans. of La religion d'Israël
- ——— (1910). Jésus et la tradition évangélique. Paris: E. Nourry. OCLC 1298783.
- ——— (1911). À propos d'histoire des religions. Paris: E. Nourry. OCLC 6652706.
- ——— (1912–1913). Choses passées. Paris: L'Union pour la vérité. OCLC 463512513.
- ——— (1914). Les mystères païens et le mystère chrétien. Paris: E. Nourry. OCLC 1749385.
- ——— (1924). My Duel with the Vatican: the Autobiography of a Catholic Modernist. Translated by Boynton, Richard Wilson. New York: E. P. Dutton & Company. OCLC 494695455. - Eng. trans. of Choses passées
- ——— (1933). La naissance du Christianisme. Paris: Emile Nourry. OCLC 958979243.
- ——— (1934). Le mandéisme et les origines chrétiennes. Paris: Émile Nourry.
- ——— (1936). Les origines du Nouveau Testament. Paris: Librairie Émile Nourry.
- ——— (1948). The Birth of the Christian Religion. Translated by Jacks, L. P. London: Allen & Unwin. OCLC 254389844. - Eng. trans. of La naissance du Christianisme
- ——— (1950). The Origins of the New Testament. Translated by Jacks, L. P. London: Allen & Unwin. - Eng. trans. of Les origines du Nouveau Testament

== See also ==
- Catholic Church in France
