= Cathedral of the Sacred Heart of Jesus, Johor Bahru =

Cathedral of the Sacred Heart of Jesus
- Malay: Katedral Hati Kudus Yesus
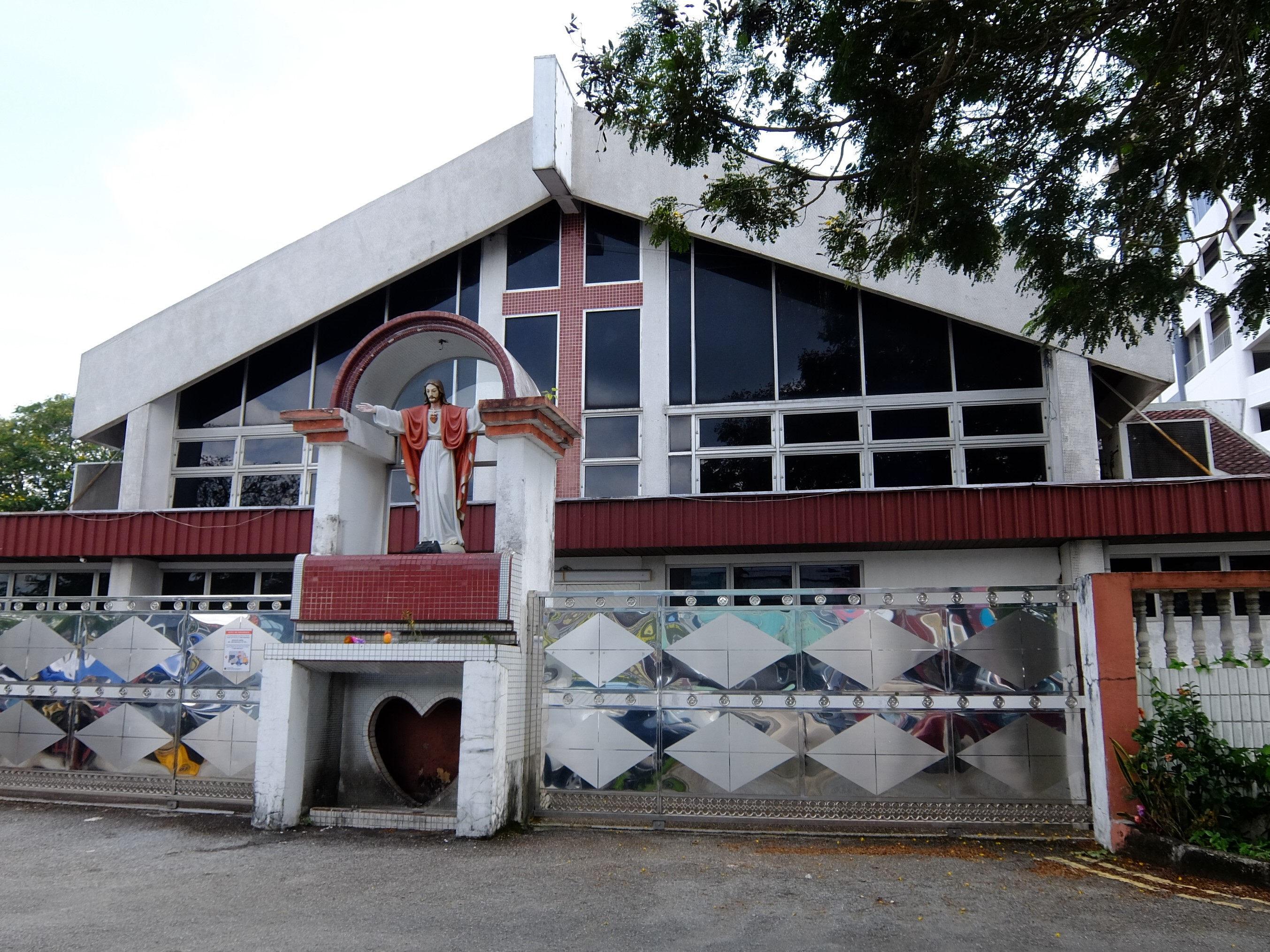
- The Cathedral's front entrance
- Cathedral of the Sacred Heart of Jesus
- 1°29′13.88″N 103°46′11.78″E
- Location: Johor Bahru, Johor Bahru District, Johor
- Country: Malaysia
- Denomination: Roman Catholic
- Website: www.shcjb.org

History
- Dedicated: 1982

Administration
- Diocese: Melaka-Johor

Clergy
- Bishop: Rt Rev Anthony Bernard Paul
- Priest: Rev Fr Simon Yong Beng Kim SJ

The Cathedral of the Sacred Heart of Jesus is a church in Taman Sri Tebrau, Johor Bahru, Johor, Malaysia, the most densely populated area of the city, surrounded by housing estates such as Melodies Garden, Taman Sri Tebrau, Taman Pelangi, Century Garden, Taman Sentosa, Kebun Teh and Majidee Park.

== History ==
The cathedral was completed in 1982, officially dedicated on 19 February by Bishop Emeritus James Chan, in the presence of the then-Apostolic Delegate Archbishop Renato Martino (now Cardinal) and all the Bishops of the Conference of Bishops for Malaysia, Singapore and Brunei.

A 25th anniversary rededication was made on 18 February 2007 by Bishop Emeritus Paul Tan of the Melaka-Johor Diocese, in the presence of the then-Apostolic Delegate, Archbishop Salvatore Pennacchio. The theme was "How Lovely is Your Dwelling Place".

== Gallery ==
Cathedral altar

Seating area

25th Anniversary of the Dedication Ceremony in 2007
