= Diocese of Malacca–Johor =

Catholic diocese in Malaysia

Coordinates: 1.4867°N 103.7700°E

Diocese of Malacca Johore Dioecesis Melakana-Giohorana Keuskupan Melaka-Johor 马六甲-柔佛教区 மலாக்கா-ஜோகூர் மறைமாவட்டம்

Catholic
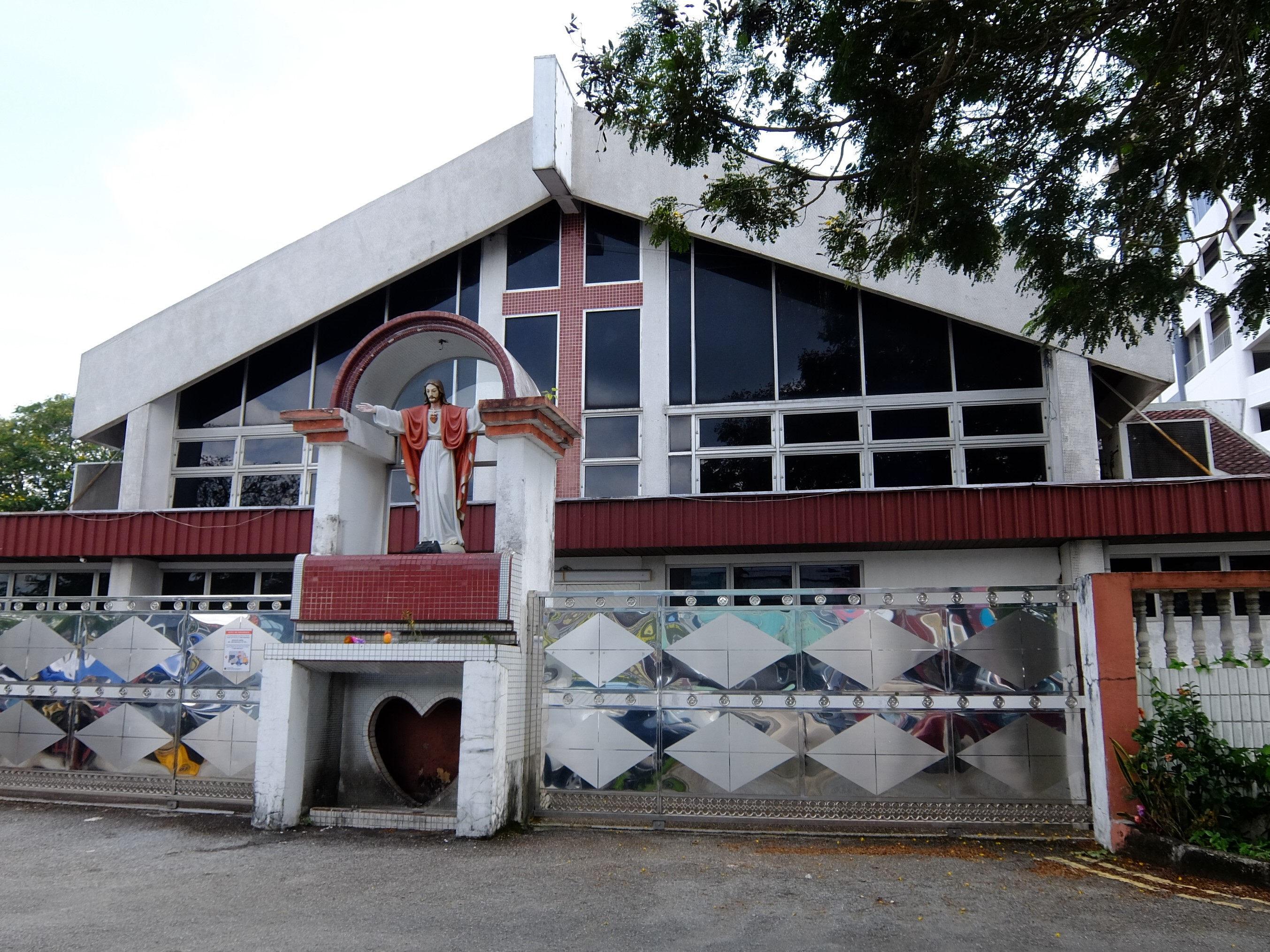
- Cathedral of the Sacred Heart of Jesus

Location
- Country: Malaysia
- Territory: Melaka; Johor
- Episcopal conference: Catholic Bishops' Conference of Malaysia, Singapore and Brunei
- Ecclesiastical province: Kuala Lumpur
- Metropolitan: Kuala Lumpur

Statistics
- Area: 20,364 km^{2} (7,863 sq mi)
- Population: Total; Catholics: (as of 2019); 5,978,000; 42,134 (.7%)
- Parishes: 21

Information
- Denomination: Catholic
- Sui iuris church: Latin Church
- Rite: Roman Rite
- Established: 18 December 1972
- Cathedral: Cathedral of the Sacred Heart of Jesus, Johor Bahru

Current leadership
- Pope: Leo XIV
- Bishop: Anthony Bernard Paul
- Metropolitan Archbishop: Julian Leow Beng Kim (2014–current)
- Vicar General: Peter Ng; Michael Mannayagam
- Bishops emeritus: Paul Tan Chee Ing (2003-2015)

Website
- https://www.mjdiocese.my/

The Diocese of Malacca Johore (Latin: Dioecesis Melakana-Giohorana; Malay: Keuskupan Melaka-Johor; Mandarin: 马六甲-柔佛教区; Tamil: மலாக்கா-ஜோகூர் மறைமாவட்டம்) is a diocese of the Latin Church of the Catholic Church in the ecclesiastical province of Kuala Lumpur in Malaysia. It is located in southern region of Peninsular Malaysia, administering Malacca and Johor states.

The mother church is the Cathedral of the Sacred Heart of Jesus, in Johor Bahru, Johor(e); there is also a former cathedral, now Church of St. Peter, in Melaka.

== History ==
- Established on 4 February 1558 as the Diocese of Malacca on territory split off from the then Diocese of Goa, within the Portuguese colonial empire.
- It became suffragan (the other being Diocese of Cochin) to the promoted Archdiocese of Goa
- Lost territory on 23 January 1576 to establish the Diocese of Macau (China)
- Lost territory in 1712 to establish the Apostolic Prefecture of Islands of the Indian Ocean
- 1838: Suppressed, its territory being joined with Siam
- Restored on 10 September 1841, albeit again with pre-diocesan status and exempt, as the Apostolic Vicariate of Western Siam, on territory split off from the then Apostolic Vicariate of Siam, with its cathedral located in Singapore
- Promoted on 19 August 1888 as the Diocese of Malacca
- Promoted on 19 September 1953 as (non-metropolitan) Archdiocese of Malacca
- 25 February 1955: Promoted as Metropolitan Archdiocese of Malacca-Singapore, having lost territories to establish the Dioceses of Kuala Lumpur (now its Metropolitan) and of Penang
- On 18 December 1972, the diocese was renamed as the Diocese of Malacca–Johor, when the Archdiocese of Malacca-Singapore was split into the Archdiocese of Singapore and this diocese. Rt. Rev James Chan was appointed as the first Bishop.
- On 27 May 1985, its name was changed to the Diocese of Melaka-Johor. The diocese is suffragan of the Metropolitan Archdiocese of Kuala Lumpur.
- On 13 February 2003, Rt. Rev Paul Tan Chee Ing, SJ was appointed as the second Bishop of the Melaka-Johor Diocese.
- On 19 November 2015, the Vatican appointed Rt. Rev Anthony Bernard Paul as the third Bishop of this Diocese.

== Parishes ==
There are 3 districts: South Johor, North Johor and Melaka. There are currently 20 churches administered under 17 parishes.

=== Vicariate of South Johor ===
- Sacred Heart of Jesus Cathedral, Taman Seri Tebrau, Johor Bahru (1982)
- Immaculate Conception Church, Tanjung Puteri, Johor Bahru (1883)
- Christ the King Church, Kulai (1951)
- Church Of The Divine Mercy, Skudai (2000)
- Church Of The Immaculate Heart Of Mary, Pontian Kechil, Pontian (1863)
- St. Joseph's Church, Plentong, Masai (1970)
- St. Theresa Church, Masai (1937)
- The Holy Family Church, Ulu Tiram (1972)
- Church of St. Elizabeth, Kota Tinggi (1970)
- Church Of Our Lady Of Lourdes, Pekan Nanas, Pontian (1969)

=== Vicariate of North Johor ===
- Church of St. Anthony, Cha'ah, Segamat (1968)
- St. Louis Church, Kluang (1928)
- St. Philip's Church, Segamat (1924)
- St. Peter's Church, Mersing (1957)
- St. Simon's Church, Labis, Segamat (1926)
- St. Henry's Church, Batu Pahat (1926)
- St. Andrew's Church, Muar (1909)
- St. Matthew's Church, Tangkak (1941)

=== Vicariate of Malacca ===
- Church of St. Francis Xavier (Melaka), Melaka City (1845)
- St. Peter's Church (Melaka), Melaka City (1710)
- St. Theresa's Church (Melaka), Gajah Berang, Central Malacca (1941)
- Church Of The Assumption Melaka, Melaka City (1850)
- Santa Cruz Church, Malim Jaya (1880)
- St. Mary's Church, Ayer Salak, Melaka City (1848)
- Church Of Our Lady Of Guadalupe (1541/2009)
- Church Of The Holy Spirit, Jasin (1989)

== Ordinaries ==
Suffragan bishops of the (First) Diocese of Malacca

No.	Portrait	Name	From	Until	Insignia
1		Jorge de Santa Luiza (?)	1558	1576	
2		João Ribeiro Gaio (?-1601)	1589	1601 (Died)	
3		Gonçalvo da Silva (?-1649)	1613	1632 (Resigned)	
4		Gregório dos Anjos (?-1689)	?	1677 (Not possessed)	
5		Antonio a San Theresia (?)	1691	?	
6		Emanuel a San Antonio (?)	1701	1738 (Resigned)	
7		Antonius de Castro (?-1743)	1738	1743 (Died)	
8		Miguel de Bulhões e Souza (?-1779)	1746	1747 (Resigned)	
9		Gerardus a San Joseph (?-1760)	1748	1760	
10		Alexandre da Sagrada Familia Ferreira da Silva (?-1818)	1782	1785 (Resigned)	
11		Francisco de São Damazo Abreu Vieira (?)	1804	1815 (Resigned)	

Apostolic Vicars of Malacca-Singapore

No.	Portrait	Name	From	Until	Insignia
1		Jean-Paul-Hilaire-Michel Courvezy, MEP (?)	1841	1844	
2		Jean-Bapitste Boucho, MEP (?)	1845	1871	
3		Michel-Esther Le Turdu, MEP (?-1877)	1871	1877 (Died)	
4		Edouard Gasnier, MEP (1833-1896)	1878	1888	

Suffragan Bishops of the (Second) Diocese of Malacca

No.	Portrait	Name	From	Until	Insignia
1		Edouard Gasnier, MEP (1833-1896)	19 August 1888	8 April 1896 (Died)	
2		René Michel Marie Fée, MEP (?-1904)	21 July 1896	20 January 1904 (Died)	
3		Marie-Luc-Alphonse-Emile Barillon, MEP (?)	10 May 1904	10 January 1933 (Resigned)	
4		Adrien Pierre Devals, MEP (1882-1945)	27 November 1933	17 January 1945 (Died)	
5		Michel Olçomendy, MEP (?)	21 January 1947	19 September 1953	

Archbishop of Malacca

No.	Portrait	Name	From	Until	Insignia
1		Michel Olçomendy, MEP (?)	19 September 1953	25 February 1955	

Metropolitan Archbishop of Malacca-Singapore

No.	Portrait	Name	From	Until	Insignia
1		Michel. Olçomendy, MEP (?)	25 February 1955	18 December 1972	

Suffragan Bishop of Malacca-Johor

No.	Portrait	Name	From	Until	Insignia
1		James Chan Soon Cheong (1926-2023)	18 December 1972	1985	

Suffragan Bishops of Melaka-Johor

No.	Portrait	Name	From	Until	Insignia
1		James Chan Soon Cheong (1926-2023)	1985	10 December 2001 (Resigned)	
2		Paul Tan Chee Ing, SJ (born 1940)	13 February 2003	19 November 2015 (Resigned)	
3		Anthony Bernard Paul (born 1951)	12 January 2016	Present	

== Clergy ==
- Msgr. Peter Ng Lai Huat
- Msgr. Michael Mannayagam
- Rev. James Rajendran
- Rev. Anthony Nge Lee Kiang
- Rev. Sebastian Koh Siong Yong, SJ
- Rev. Aaron Alammalay
- Rev. Adrian Francis
- Rev. Alexuchelvam Mariasoosai
- Rev. Claurence Motoyou, OFM (Outsationed from Archdiocese of Kota Kinabalu)
- Rev. Cyril Mannayagam
- Rev. Damian Charles Pereira
- Rev. Devadasan Madala Muthu
- Rev. Edward Rayappan
- Rev. Francis Go, OFM Cap (posted to Diocese of Sibu)
- Rev. Jason Wong Kok Cheak
- Rev. Joseph (Joe) Matthews, OFM Cap
- Rev. John Anandan Chinnapan, OFM Cap
- Rev. John Baptist Yoew Kah Chok
- Rev. John Chia Khee Long, CDD
- Rev. John Kelvin Pereira
- Rev. Joseph Heng Chon Sin
- Rev. Joseph Lee Hock Jin, OFM (Outstationed from Diocese of Sibu; posted to Archdiocese of Kuching)
- Rev. Lawrence Ng Yew Kim
- Rev. Leo Elias
- Rev. Lionel Thomas
- Rev. Louis Chin Soon Teck
- Rev. Martinian Lee Hock Chuan
- Rev. Matthew Bun Chang Yong
- Rev. Dr. Michael Teng Woon Pheng
- Rev. Moses Rayappan Paul Raj
- Rev. Moses Yap Poh Sing, OFM (Outstationed to Archdiocese of Kota Kinabalu)
- Rev. Neville Arul Sinnappah
- Rev. Patrick Tyoh Kai Hong
- Rev. Paul Sia Chau Kiang
- Rev. Paul Wong Poh Loke
- Rev. Ryan Innas Muthu
- Rev. Simon Yong Kong Beng, SJ
- Rev. Sixtus Pitah Amit, OFM (Outstaioned from Archdiocese of Kota Kinabalu)
- Rev. Thomas Chong Tet Fook, SJ
- Rev. Thomas Koo Kwai Fong, CDD
- Rev. William Pillai

=== Retired ===
- Rev. Bartholomew K.C. Wong
- Rev. Benedict Yee Yat Chong
- Rev. Lucas Ho

== Religious orders ==
- Congregration of the Disciples of the Lord (CDD)
- Order of Friars Minor (OFM)
- Order of Friars Minor Capuchin (OFM Cap)
- Society of Jesus (SJ)

== See also ==
- Catholic Church in Malaysia
- List of Catholic dioceses (structured_view)- Episcopal Conference of Malaysia, Singapore and Brunei
- List of Catholic dioceses in Malaysia
