= Cornelius Piong =

Malaysian prelate of the Catholic Church (born 1949)

His Grace The Right Reverend Datuk Cornelius Piong D.D., P.G.D.K.
- Bishop of Keningau
- Church: Catholic Church
- Diocese: Diocese of Keningau
- Appointed: 17 December 1992
- Installed: 6 May 1993
- Predecessor: Established

Orders
- Ordination: 27 March 1977 by Simon Michael Fung Kui Heong
- Consecration: 6 May 1993 by Peter Chung Hoan Ting

Personal details
- Born: 1 July 1949 (age 77) Kampung Tegilung, Bundu, Kuala Penyu, North Borneo (now Sabah, Malaysia)
- Denomination: Roman Catholic
- Education: St Francis Xavier Major Seminary, Singapore & College General, Penang
- Motto: Kebahagiaan adalah Kesetiaan (Joy comes with loyalty)

Datuk Cornelius Piong (born 1 July 1949) is a Malaysian prelate of the Catholic Church. He became Bishop of Keningau in 1993.

== Early and personal life ==
Cornelius was born in Bundu, Kuala Penyu on 1 July 1949 to the late Augustine Piong Senagang (1925 – 1998) and the late Lucia Martinus @ Lucy Kimsin (1927 – 2023).

In 1970, he entered St Francis Xavier's Major Seminary in Singapore and later furthered his studies at College General, Penang in 1972. On 27 March 1977, he was ordained priest in his hometown parish of St Peter the Apostle, Bundu, Kuala Penyu by Bishop Simon Michael Fung Kui Heong. In June 1987, he was appointed as vicar general of the Diocese of Kota Kinabalu (now Archdiocese).

On 17 December 1992, Cornelius received his appointment to be the bishop of the newly created Diocese of Keningau. He was ordained bishop on 6 May 1993 at St Francis Xavier's Cathedral, Keningau by Archbishop Peter Chung Hoan Ting.

Cornelius is the first bumiputera Catholic bishop in Malaysia. He is of Dusun Tatana ethnicity, an indigenous tribe native to the Malaysian state of Sabah from the majority Kadazan-Dusun ethnic group found in his hometown of Kuala Penyu as well as in neighbouring Beaufort district of southern Sabah state.

== Honours ==
Cornelius was the recipient of the Commander of the Order of Kinabalu (P.G.D.K.) award which carries the title "Datuk" from the former Sabah Head of State, the late Tun Sakaran Dandai (1930 – 2021) in 1996, in conjunction with his 66th official birthday celebrations.

=== Honours of Sabah ===
- Sabah
  - Commander of the Order of Kinabalu (P.G.D.K.) (1996)
