= St. Philip's Church, Segamat =

Church in Segamat, Johor, Malaysia

Coordinates: 2.5150°N 102.8119°E

Church of St. Philip
- Gereja St. Philip (Malay)
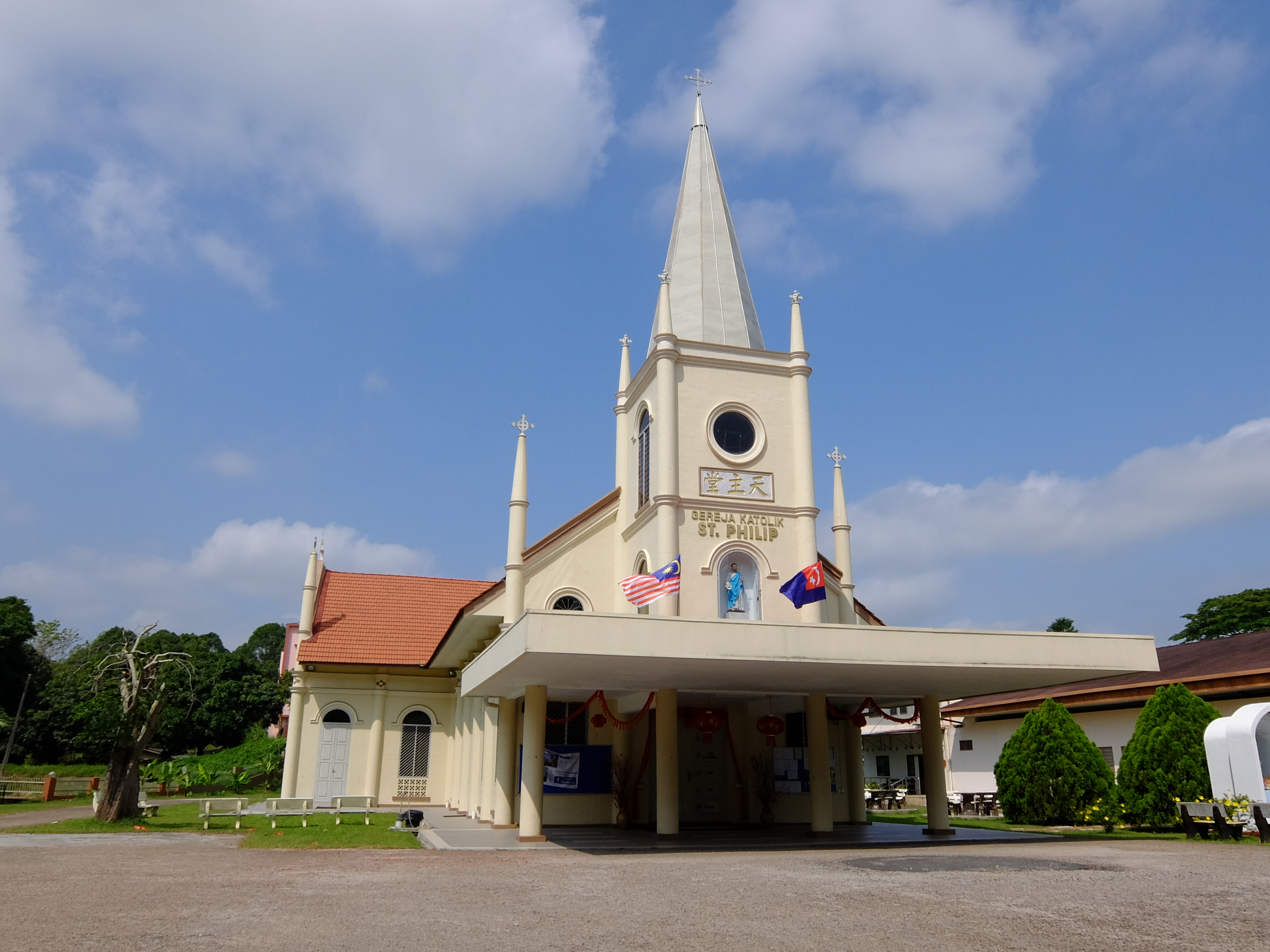
- Church of St. Philip
- Location: Jalan Buloh Kasap, Kampung Gubah, 85000 Segamat, Johor
- Country: Malaysia
- Denomination: Roman Catholic
- Tradition: Latin Rite

History
- Dedication: Philip the Apostle

Architecture
- Architectural type: Church
- Style: Gothic Architecture
- Completed: 1924

Administration
- Parish: Malacca Vicariate Forane (under Roman Catholic Diocese of Malacca-Johor)

St Philip Catholic Church is a Catholic church located in the district of Segamat at the district capital of Segamat, Malaysia. It was built in 1924 and is the only Catholic church in the town.

== History ==
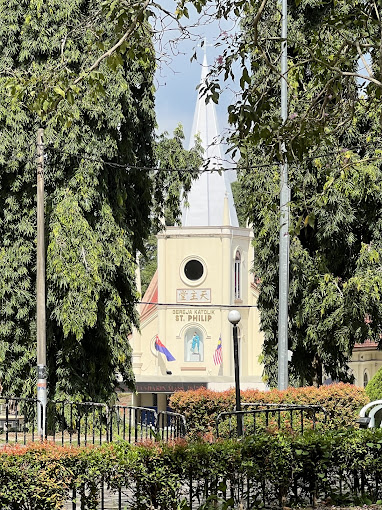
St. Philip's Church, Segamat.

St Philip Church Segamat was the first town in northern Johor to obtain a foreign Paris Foreign Mission Society member (MEP) to arrive and gathered around 300 faithful to form the first parish of St Philip. Fr. Jules Francois, the parish priest of the Church of St. Francis Xavier (Melaka) was in charge of the foundation of the parish since its inception. The first church of St Philip was built in 1924 for a total of 50 parishoners at a time. In 1955, the old church was converted into the parish hall located beside the present church, which was constructed by Fr. Louis Wee and declared open and blessed in the same year by Archbishop Micheal Olcomendy of Singapore and is one of only two Romanesque churches in Johor to date.

In 1956, a cannosian convent was established behind the church, featuring a chapel and hostel for students studying in the area. In 1959, the Parochial House was built on the adjacent land. The church was renovated in 2014 after termite infestation on the roof beams was found and reopened just in time for the jubliee year of 2015. The church also commissioned and installed four panes of stained glass in the period overlooking the sanctuary depicting scenes from the gospel.

== Chapels under St Philip's Church jurisdiction ==
=== Chapel of St Joseph, Genuang ===
Originally built in 1948 as a wooden chapel, the new chapel was built in 1992.

=== St Anthony Church, Chaah ===
Built in 1953, the current structure however dates to 2005.

=== Chapel of St Paul the Hermit, Chaah ===
The more than a century old chapel was originally built for the estate workers and is still in use, despite having the more centrally located St Anthony Church in Chaah Town.
