= Michel-Esther Le Turdu =

French Catholic bishop (1826–1877)

The Right Reverend Michel-Esther Le Turdu M.E.P.
- Vicar Apostolic of Malacca-Singapore
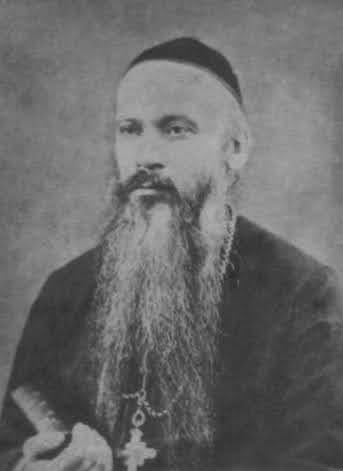
- Installed: 6 March 1871
- Term ended: 10 May 1877
- Predecessor: Jean-Bapitste Boucho
- Successor: Edouard Gasnier

Orders
- Ordination: 16 April 1850, as priest
- Consecration: 14 May 1871, as bishop by Paul Ambroise Bigandet

Personal details
- Born: 17 July 1826 Quintin, France
- Died: 10 May 1877 (aged 50) Paris
- Buried: Montparnasse Cemetery
- Denomination: Roman Catholic

Michel-Esther Le Turdu MEP (17 July 1826 – 10 May 1877) was a French Roman Catholic missionary and bishop who served as Vicar Apostolic of Malacca-Singapore from 1871 to 1877.

== Biography ==
Le Turdu was born on 17 July 1826 in Quintin, France. After completing his initial studies at Tréguier seminary, he joined the Foreign Missions Society in 1847, and was ordained a priest on 16 April 1850.

Le Turdu was sent to Malaya in August 1850, and carried out missionary work among the tribal people. He soon learnt the Malay language and translated religious texts into Malay for the mission. Later, he published his own books on prayer in Malay, and translated into Malay the papal bull Ineffabilis Deus to be sent to Rome. In 1852, he settled in Penang where he remained for 19 years, at first administering in the parish of the Church of the Assumption in George Town. From 1855 to 1871, he administered in the parishes of Pulau Tikus and Balik Pulau where he built a church and a girls' school and baptised many Chinese in the area.

On 1 March 1871, Le Turdu was appointed coadjutor of Vicar Apostolic of Malacca-Singapore and titular Bishop of Corycus, and on 6 March 1871, succeeded Jean-Baptise Boucho as Vicar Apostolic of Malacca-Singapore. He was consecrated bishop on 14 May 1871 in his church at Pulau Tikus by Bishop Paul Ambroise Bigandet, Vicar Apostolic of Burma.

Le Turdu founded a new mission station at Larut, and planned to establish further missions in Perak but became ill with dysentery and went to stay in a sanatorium in Hong Kong. After returning to Malaya, his health deteriorated and he departed for France. Shortly after arriving at the Foreign Missions seminary, he died on 10 May 1877, aged 50, and was buried in Montparnasse Cemetery, Paris.
