= St. Peter's Church (Melaka) =

Church in Melaka City, Melaka State, Malaysia

Coordinates: 2°12′08.8″N 102°15′11.4″E

- Gereja St. Peter (Malay)
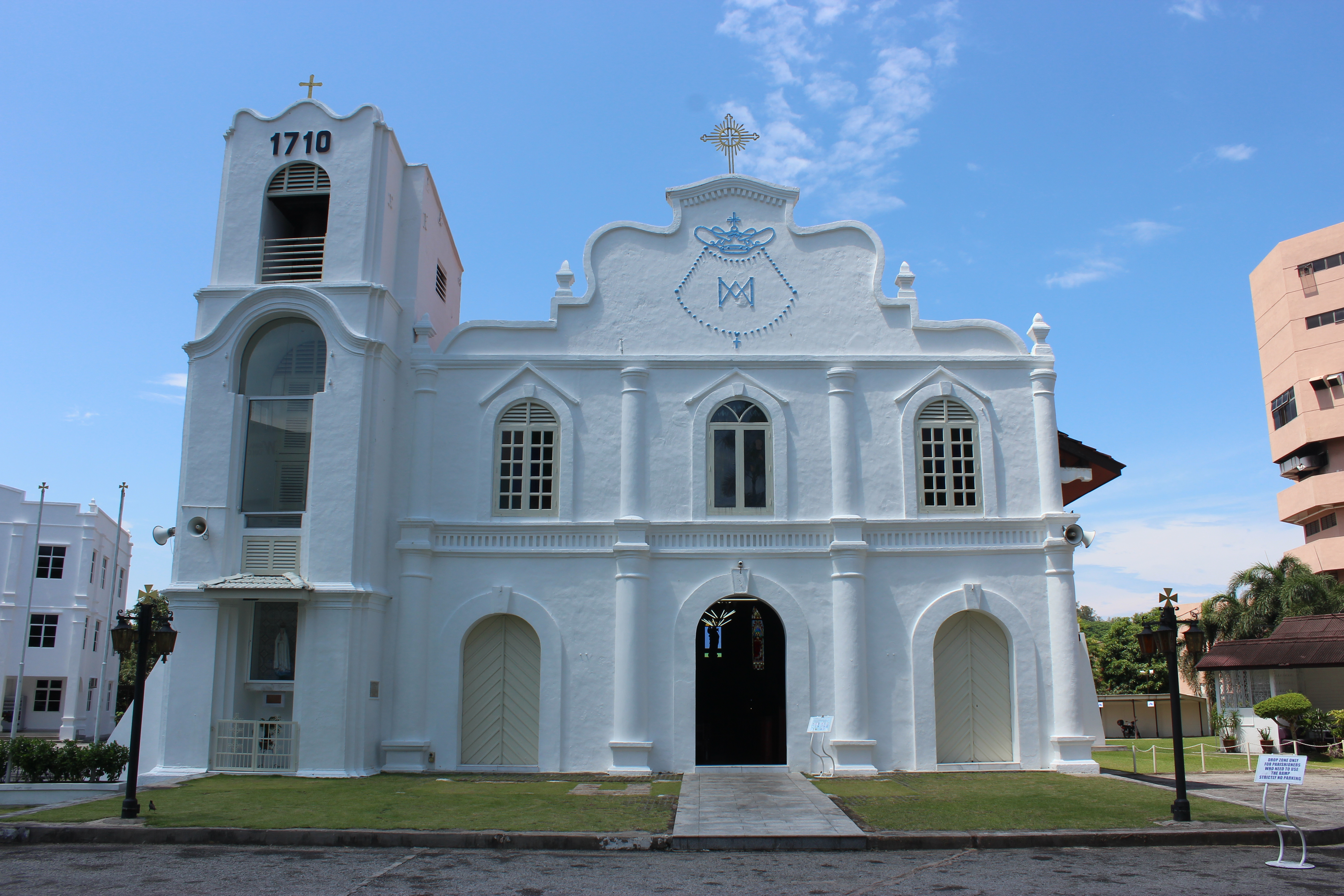
- St. Peter's Church
- Location: 166 Jalan Bendahara; Melaka
- Country: Malaysia
- Denomination: Roman Catholic
- Tradition: Latin Rite

History
- Dedication: Saint Peter
- Consecrated: 1710

Architecture
- Architect: unknown
- Architectural type: Church
- Style: Colonial Dutch Baroque architecture
- Completed: 1710

Administration
- Parish: Malacca Vicariate Forane (under Roman Catholic Diocese of Malacca-Johor)

Clergy
- Priest: Fr Lionel Thomas

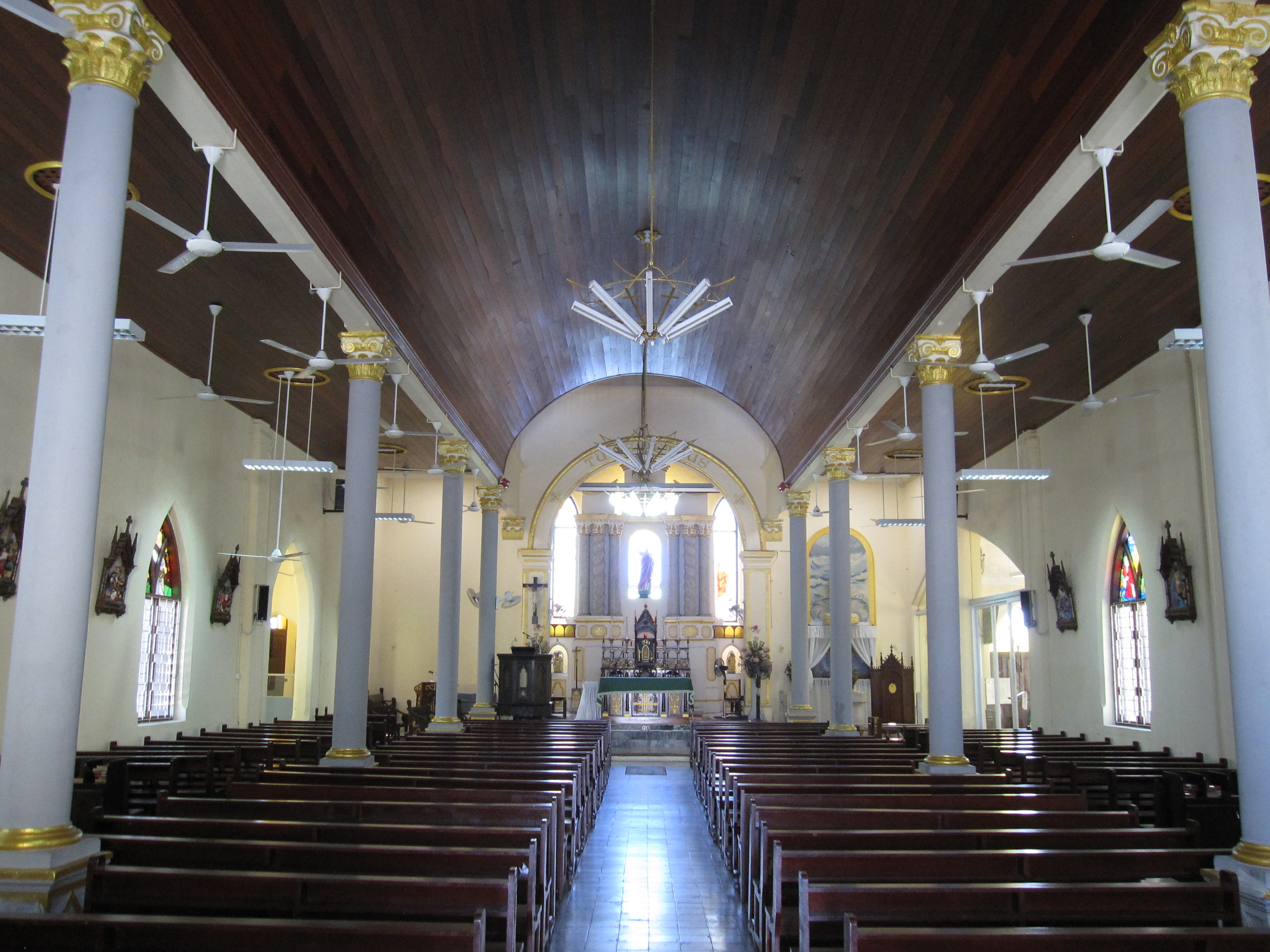
St. Peter's Church interior

St. Peter's Church (Malay: Gereja St. Peter) is a church in Melaka City, Melaka, Malaysia. It is the oldest functioning Roman Catholic church in Malaysia and the third largest Catholic church in Melaka City after the Church of St. Francis Xavier (Melaka) and St. Theresa's Church (Melaka) in Gajah Berang, a district located north from St Peter's church.

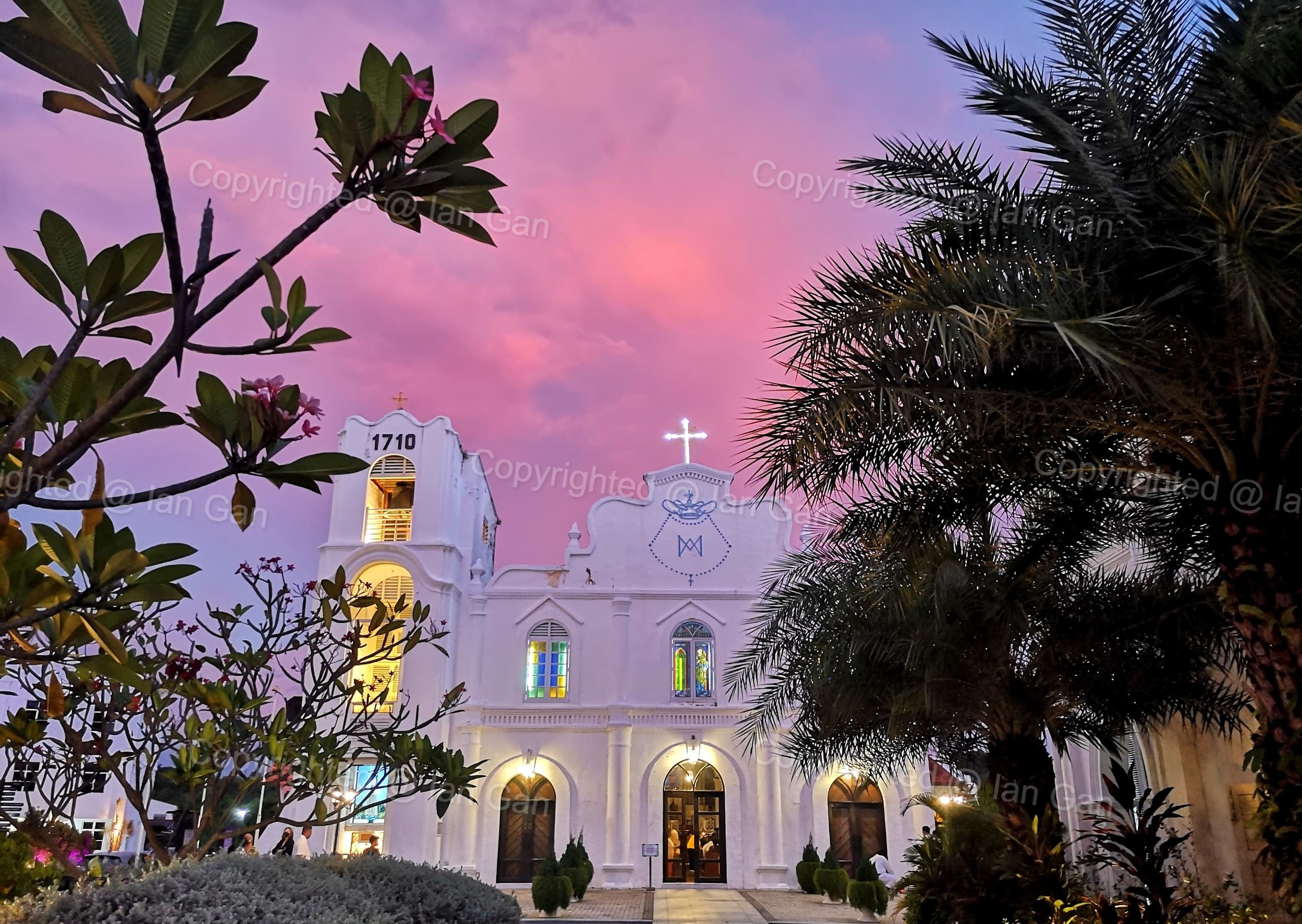
St Peter Church Melaka during sunset

== History ==
The Portuguese occupation of Melaka ended when Melaka fell to the Dutch in 1641. This was followed by period of persecutions of the Catholics in Melaka by the Dutch. Churches were destroyed and Catholics were not permitted to have their own cemeteries or even pray in their homes. Priests were also forbidden from administering their flocks. The War of the Spanish Succession resulted in an alliance formed between the Portuguese and the Dutch in 1703. This resulted in the Dutch adopting a softer stance towards the Portuguese Catholics. After years of persecutions, a piece of land was donated by a Dutch convert named Maryber Franz Amboer in the District of Saba in which the first priest, Fr. Domingos Monteiro, named it after the patron saint of fishermen for the Portuguese Catholic and thus St. Peter's Church was built in 1710.

Above the front balcony of the presbytery, the Republic of Portugal crest was worked into the masonry of the façade as it was built using funds sent for the overseas missions of the Portuguese, which included Goa and Macau. For about a century, there were few changes made to the grounds of the Church of St Peter — the Sacristan's quarter was built, a small hall for functions added alongside the presbytery and the field leveled and turned into a car park. Subsequently, a parish hall was erected on a large portion of the car park and extensive restoration of the church was undertaken to mark its tercentenary celebration in 2010. Recently, landscaping was done to beautify the grounds, and modern amenities were put in place in the church.

St Peter's was a Portuguese mission church for almost three centuries, served by 64 priests from Portugal, Goa, and Macau, It only came under the ecclesial jurisdiction of the Bishops of the Portuguese Missions after the country's independence in 1957.

In 2024, a marble statue of St Micheal was donated by Catholics from Singapore and now stands in the garden next to the right transept of the church.

== Architecture ==
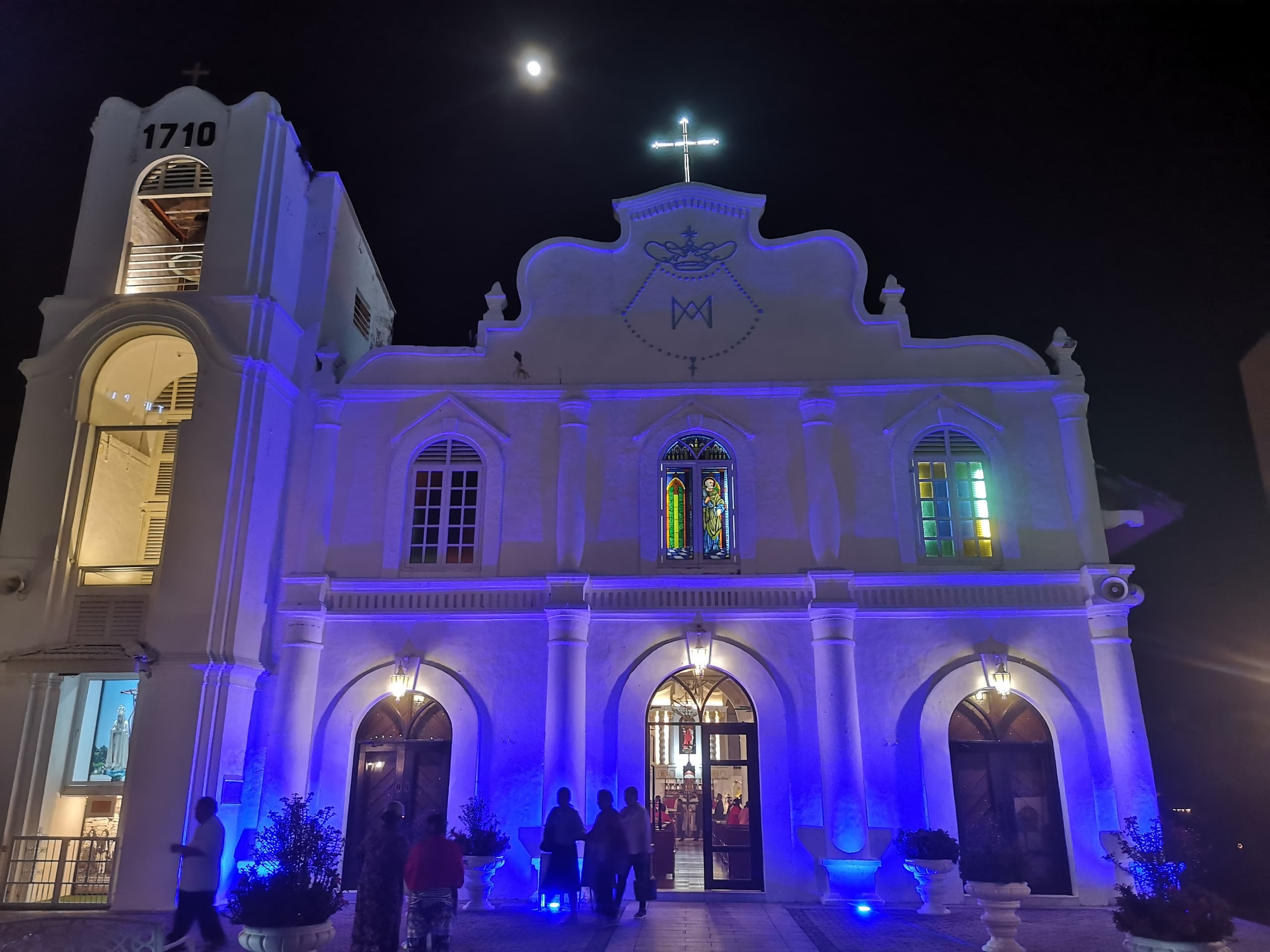
Facade of the Church Of St Peter At Night

The facade and decorations of the church have a combination of eastern and western architecture. There is also a hint of Portuguese baroque architecture on the facade. Its interior features the original high altar, numerous stained glass window, a barrel-vaulted ceiling and two side Altars dedicated to the Sacred Heart and Our Lady of The Rosary, along with the original transept dedicated to Christ's Passion, where there is also an alabaster statue of the Lord Before the Resurrection in which the practice originates from the Augustinians church of St Lawrence at the present ruins of Capella Ermida de Rosario, which is still being carried out today by the Irmaos De Igreja (Fraternity of the Brothers of the church)

One of its bells was cast in Goa in 1608 and was salvaged from an older church the Dutch had burnt down, possibly from that of St Lawrence Church - one of the few churches built in the early 1600s located outside the city walls during the Portuguese era. A chapel now stands on its site built in 1700 known as Capella Ermida de Rosario or also known as St Lawrence Chapel.

Located within the church are also 14 tombstones dating from 1736 to the 1900s. Majority of them are found near the altar with one located in the left transept, one located behind the bell tower and the largest tombstone located behind the left pillar of the choir gallery.

== Chapels Under St Peter's Church Jurisdiction ==
There are several chapels under St Peter's jurisdiction:-

=== Capella Ermida de Rosario, Saba District ===
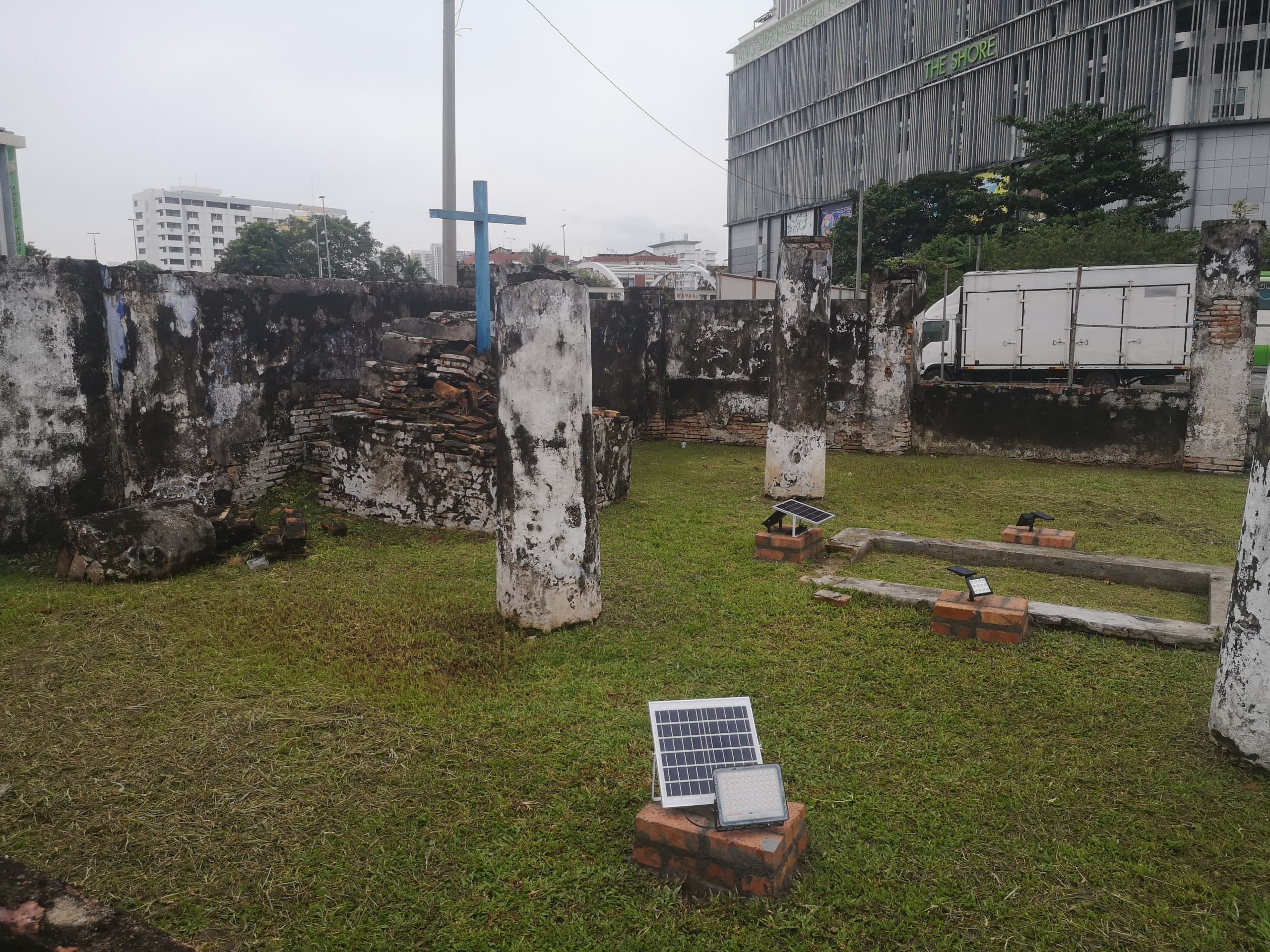
Capella Ermida de Rosario

Before St Peter's church was built, a substitute chapel was constructed on the grounds of the ruins of St Lawrence Church known as Ermida de Rosario, or also known as the Rosary Chapel in 1700. The chapel was used for services until the late 1900s when its decline became obvious with the more preferable St Peter's church being nearby. Several dignities were laid to rest in the chapel including Emerici de Souza's tombstone being the only one present until today.

Talks on the rebuilding of the chapel surfaced in 2015 but no work has been done as of 2024. However, St Peter's Church's rector, Fr. Lionel Thomas, has placed a blue cross to mark the site and several services have been conducted occasionally at the site of the ruins.

=== Assumption Chapel, Praya Lane ===
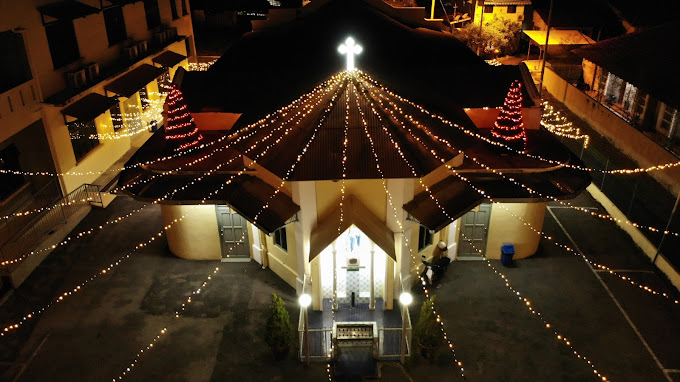
Assumption Chapel on Praya Lane during Christmas

The Assumption Chapel was initially built in 1850 as a wooden chapel before being rebuilt and extended into the cross-shape of its present form in 1919. The chapel was constructed for the Portuguese community originally living in the Praya Lane area and still functions today. The chapel features a black St Anthony statue erected in 1959 as well as the statue of Our Lady Of The Assumption, facing the sea. The chapel also features 2 side altars and stained glass at the altar.

The chapel is famous for its annual Sugarcane tradition for its feast day due to the chapel historically being surrounded by Sugarcane plantations. The chapel also boasts lots of miracle sightings.

=== St John Chapel, Praya Lane ===
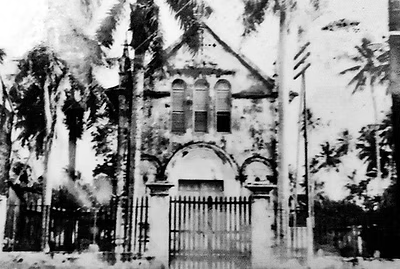
The original photo of St John's Chapel on Praya Lane

The Chapel of St. John the Baptist, built on land donated by the De Souza family in 1864, was completed and consecrated by Fr. François Allard, the parish priest of St. Francis Xavier Church. The chapel was used as a chapel cum kindergarten for almost 100 years before it was deconsecrated and demolished in 1960 after further expansion was carried out onto Assumption Chapel a few meters down Praya Lane.

=== Capella de Santa Cruz, Malim Hill ===
Capella Santa Cruz, or Santa Cruz Chapel was built in 1850 in honour of the holy cross found on Malim hill after some accounts tell of a devout Catholic lady from Kubu who fell ill. All possible medical aid was given to her to no avail. One night in her dream, an old man appeared and told her that a cross would be found on top of Malim Hill. A couple of days later, with the assistance of neighbours, the woman's family found a 46 cm cross on the hill partially covered by a termite nest. The chapel holds a feast day every September for pilgrims to venerate the holy cross, which was said to be chipped off due to the greediness of people over the years, but has since been preserved.

=== Capella Nossa Senhora de Consengsang, Portuguese Settlement ===
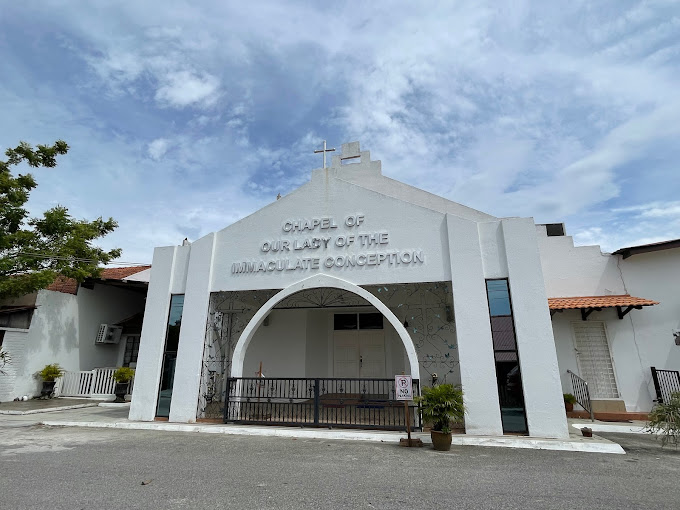
Capella Nossa Senhora de Consengsang, Melaka

Built in 2010, it is located behind the Portuguese Square within the Portuguese Settlement in Ujong Pasir. It is also commonly referred to as the Chapel of the Immaculate Conception in English. The festival of San Pedro is now held here yearly in June in honour of St Peter, the patron saint for the Portuguese who settle here. The chapel features 2 piece of stained glass as the main backdrop for the altar.

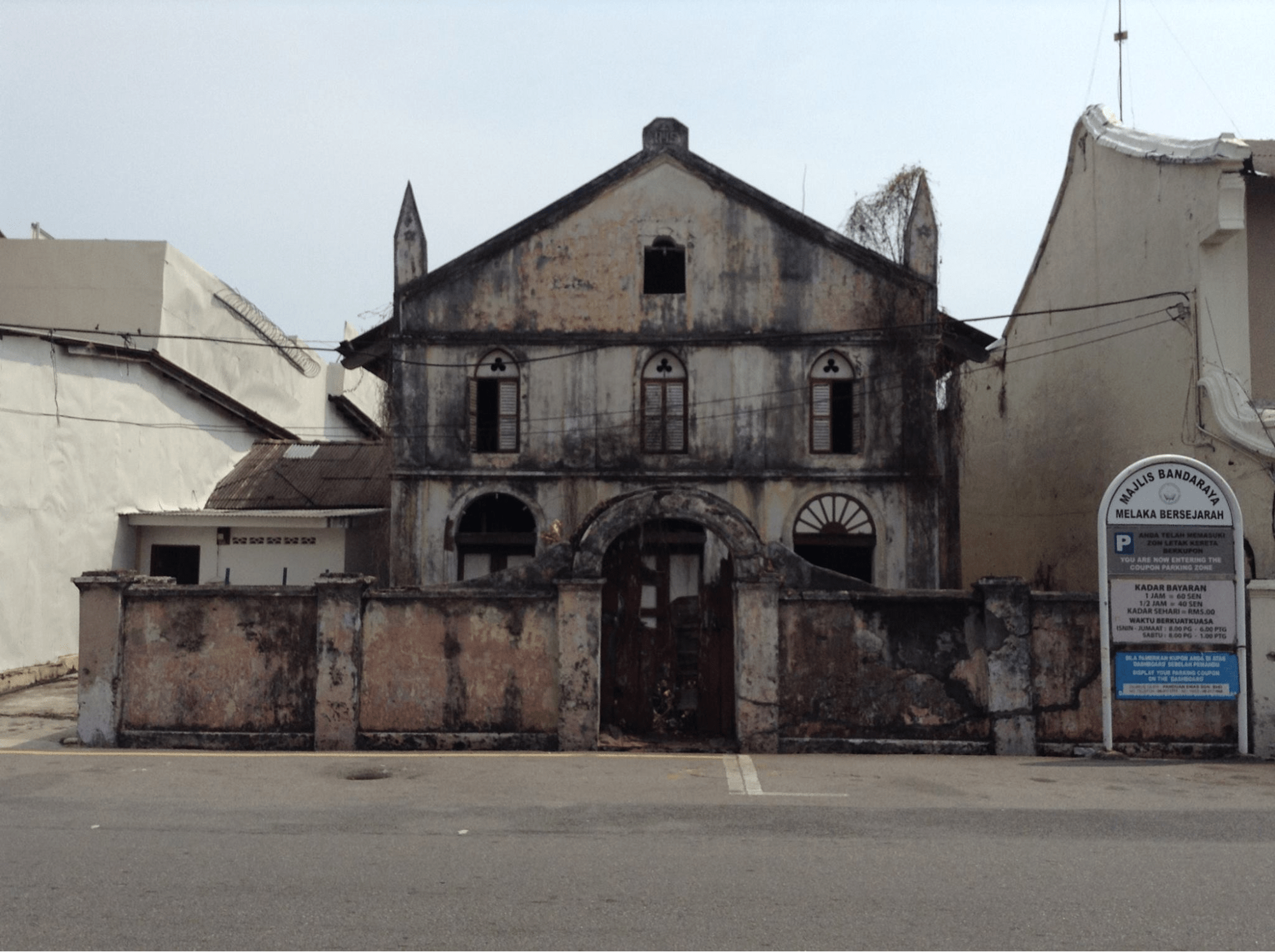
The Sacred Heart Chapel in Tengkera (Tranquerah) District, Melaka

=== Sacred Heart Chapel, Tengkera ===
This chapel was built in the early 1800s for the Catholics in Tengkera, which was however abandoned in 1960s due to the lack of Portuguese Catholics left residing in the area and the expiring of lease for the land in which the chapel stands. The chapel layout is very similar to the Rosary Chapel in Saba District, now in ruins.

The building still stands today but is now under private property with plans to become a wedding venue or an event space.

== Further Information ==
St Peter's church is a still functional church. Please do maintain proper dress code prior to visit.

== See also ==
- List of tourist attractions in Melaka
- Christianity in Malaysia
- Roman Catholic Diocese of Malacca–Johor
- Se Cathedral
