= List of Catholic dioceses in Malaysia, Singapore, and Brunei =

The Catholic Church in Malaysia, Singapore and Brunei is composed of a Latin Church hierarchy, joint in the transnational Episcopal Conference of Malaysia, Singapore and Brunei, consisting of three ecclesiastical provinces in Malaysia, a non-metropolitan archdiocese for Singapore, and a pre-diocesan Apostolic Vicariate for Brunei. There are no Eastern Catholic jurisdictions.

There is an Apostolic Nunciature to Malaysia as papal diplomatic representation (embassy-level) in the national capital Kuala Lumpur. In it the Apostolic Delegation (lower level) to Brunei is also vested.
There is a separate Apostolic Nunciature to Singapore (in the capital of the same name), into which are vested the Non-Residential Pontifical Representation for Vietnam and Apostolic Nunciature to the Association of Southeast Asian Nations (ASEAN, which all abovementioned states belong to, with others in the region).

== Current Latin jurisdictions ==
=== Exempt jurisdictions ===
- Archdiocese of Singapore, covering all and only Singapore
- Apostolic Vicariate of Brunei Darussalam, covering all and only Brunei

=== Ecclesiastical Province of Kuala Lumpur ===
covering Peninsular Malaysia

- Metropolitan Archdiocese of Kuala Lumpur
  - Diocese of Malacca-Johor
  - Diocese of Penang

=== Ecclesiastical Province of Kuching ===
covering Sarawak state, on Borneo

- Metropolitan Archdiocese of Kuching
  - Diocese of Miri
  - Diocese of Sibu

=== Ecclesiastical Province of Kota Kinabalu ===
covering Sabah state, on Borneo

- Metropolitan Archdiocese of Kota Kinabalu
  - Diocese of Keningau
  - Diocese of Sandakan.

== Former jurisdictions ==
There are no titular sees. All defunct jurisdictions have current successor sees.

The Archdiocese of Malacca-Singapore was split into the Archdiocese of Singapore and the Diocese of Malacca-Johor in 1972, seven years after Singapore became independent.

== See also ==
- List of Catholic dioceses (structured view)
- Catholic Church in Malaysia
- Catholic Church in Brunei
- Catholic Church in Singapore

== Sources and external links ==
- GCatholic.org - data for all sections.
- Catholic-Hierarchy entry.
