= St. Theresa's Church (Melaka) =

Church in Melaka City, Melaka State, Malaysia

Coordinates: 2°12′24″N 102°14′32″E

- Gereja St. Theresa (Malay)
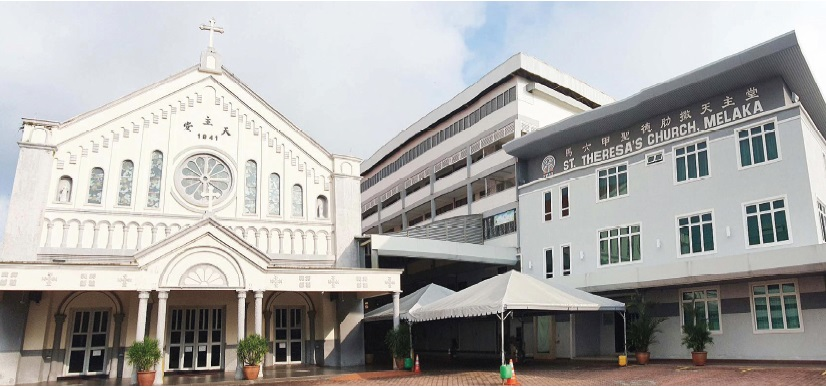
- St. Theresa's Church
- Location: Jalan Gajah Berang, Kampung Tujuh, 75200 Melaka; Melaka
- Country: Malaysia
- Denomination: Roman Catholic
- Tradition: Latin Rite

History
- Dedication: Thérèse of Lisieux
- Consecrated: December 15th 1941

Architecture
- Architectural type: Church
- Style: Colonial Gothic Revival architecture
- Years built: 3
- Completed: 1941

Administration
- Parish: Malacca Vicariate Forane (under Roman Catholic Diocese of Malacca-Johor)

St Theresa's Church is a church in Melaka City, Melaka, Malaysia. It is the second largest catholic church in Melaka after the Church of St. Francis Xavier (Melaka) and is the third oldest after St. Peter's Church (Melaka) and St Francis Xavier Church. The church was built to serve the Chinese-speaking Catholic community and was completed in 1941.

== History ==
The church of St Theresa was initially proposed by the then parish priest of St Francis Xavier Church (SFX) in Melaka as a church for the migrant chinese catholic community. SFX parish priest Fr Raymond Dubois, MEP, to voice their desire for a church catering to the needs of the Chinese-speaking Catholics.

After consulting the Bishop of Malacca Singapore, Msgr Adrien-Pierre Devals, MEP, in 1938, Fr Dubois took the responsibility of building a church for them. He bought a piece of land along Jalan Gajah Berang, where the present church has stood for 81 years, for $5,000.

In addition to some thousand Chinese Catholics in the community who contributed physically and financially towards building their place of worship, Fr Dubois organised fundraisers in Johor Bahru and Singapore to garner funds to help complete building the church. Three years later, Bishop Devals blessed and dedicated the Church of St Theresa of the Child Jesus on December 15, 1941, just before the Japanese captured Malacca.

== Architecture ==
Located within the church are stained glass featuring Our Lady Of the Immaculate Conception and St Theresa as backdrops for the altar with the middle stained glass of the sacred heart being blocked after renovations. It may still be seen from the rear of the church nave. The wings of the church feature stained glasses highlighting the stations of the cross.

On the facade, a rose window is placed center above the choir loft and two small white statues or St Theresa and the Sacred Heart could be seen on either end.

The church is also flanked by 14 stations of the cross stained glass windows and a few other scenes of the bible near the sacristy.
