= Church of St. Francis Xavier (Melaka) =

Church in Melaka City, Melaka State, Malaysia

Coordinates: 2°11′42.9″N 102°15′2.3″E

- Gereja St. Francis Xavier (Malay)
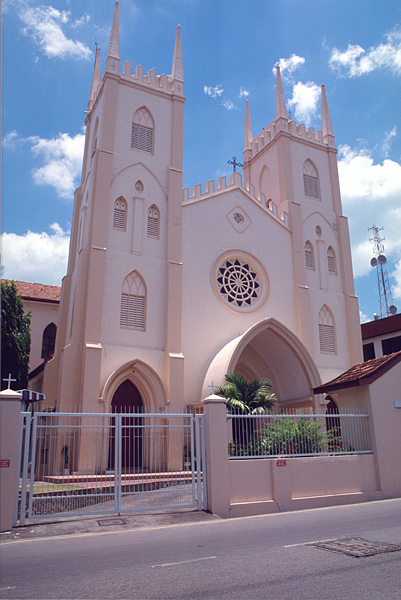
- Church of St. Francis Xavier
- Location: 12 Jalan Banda Kaba; Malacca
- Country: Malaysia
- Denomination: Roman Catholic
- Tradition: Latin Rite

History
- Dedication: Saint Francis Xavier

Architecture
- Architectural type: church
- Style: Neo-Gothic
- Years built: 1849; 177 years ago
- Completed: 1856; 170 years ago

Administration
- Parish: Malacca Vicariate Forane (under Roman Catholic Diocese of Malacca-Johor)

The Church of St. Francis Xavier (Malay: Gereja St. Francis Xavier) is a church in Malacca City, Malacca, Malaysia. It is the largest church in Melaka. It is also the third oldest church after St. Peter's Church (Melaka) and Christ Church, Malacca.

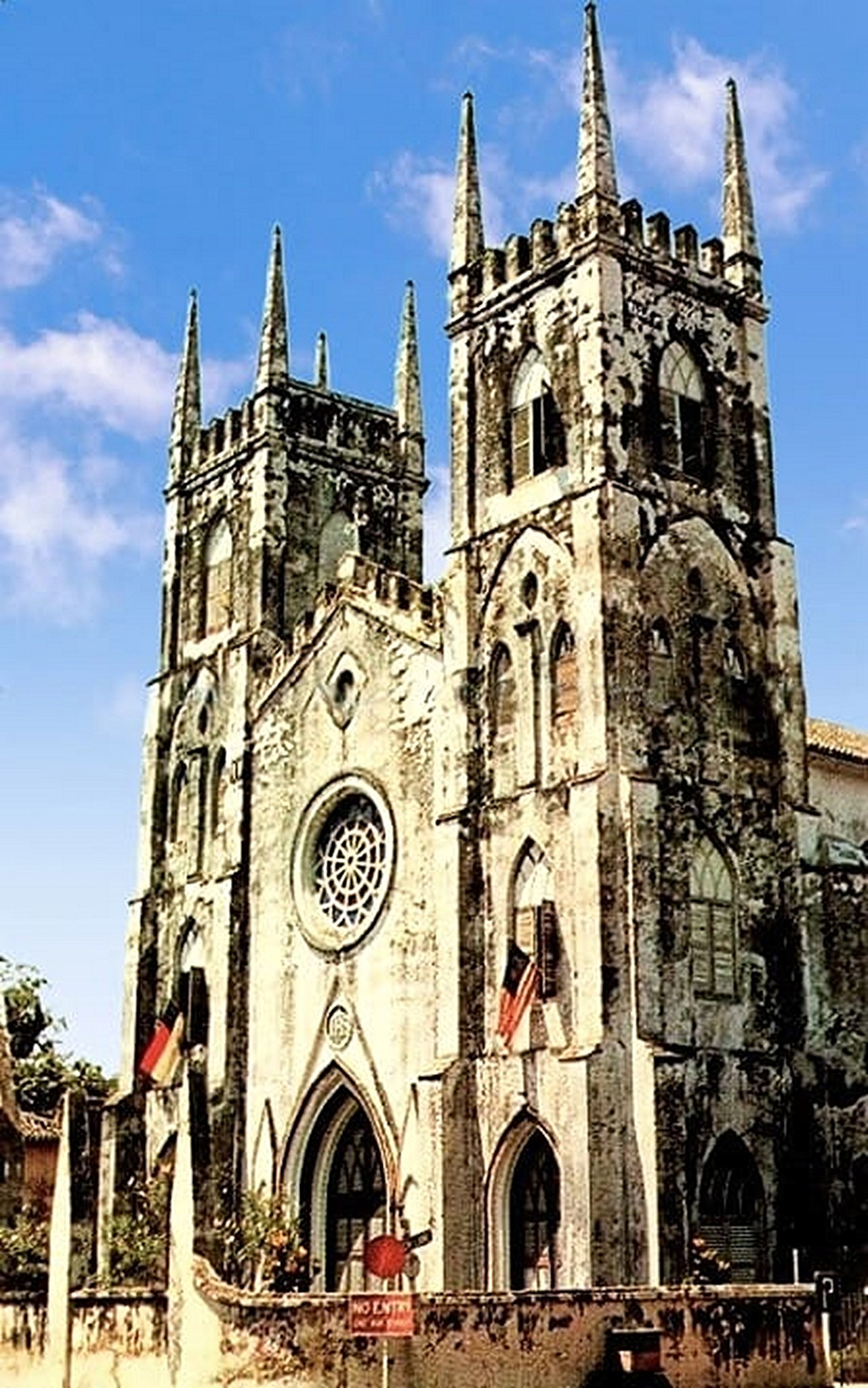
The St Francis Xavier Church Melaka in 1960, before the portico was added.

== History ==
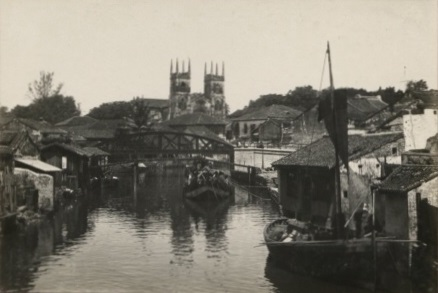
Image of the church in 1930-1940

The church was built in 1849 on the site of an old Portuguese Church of St Dominic by a French MEP priest, Father Farvé. Fr. Farvé was sent to as far as the South Americas to raise funds for the church in which was finally enough in 1856. The finishing touches of the building were completed in 1856 by Father Allard, with the present-day presbytery built in 1874.

The church's origins actually dated from 1845 but was not successful due to jurisdiction issues with the Portuguese's St. Peter's Church (Melaka) which was under the administration of the diocese of Macau.

In the early 1900s, a marble high altar was purchased from France and placed in the sanctuary. It was once known as one of the most stunning altar pieces in the region, and now forms part of the current altar after the redesigning of the sanctuary during the Vatican II process. Much of the church remains unchanged except for the portico added in 1965 and building of a shrine in front of the church a few years after.

The Church of St Francis Xavier is also known to found numerous other parishes within the Roman Catholic Diocese of Malacca–Johor such as St. Philip's Church, Segamat, St. Theresa's Church (Melaka), St Andrew Church Muar in 1908 and St Mary Ayer Salak in 1848.

== Architecture ==
The church is a twin-spired neo-gothic structure. It is believed that the church was modeled after the Cathedral of St. Peter in Montpellier, Southern France, which closely followed the older church’s original construction, except for a portico which was added on in 1963. It's also the only neo-gothic structure in Malaysia and the MEP missionaries' largest church built at the time and is still the largest church in Melaka.

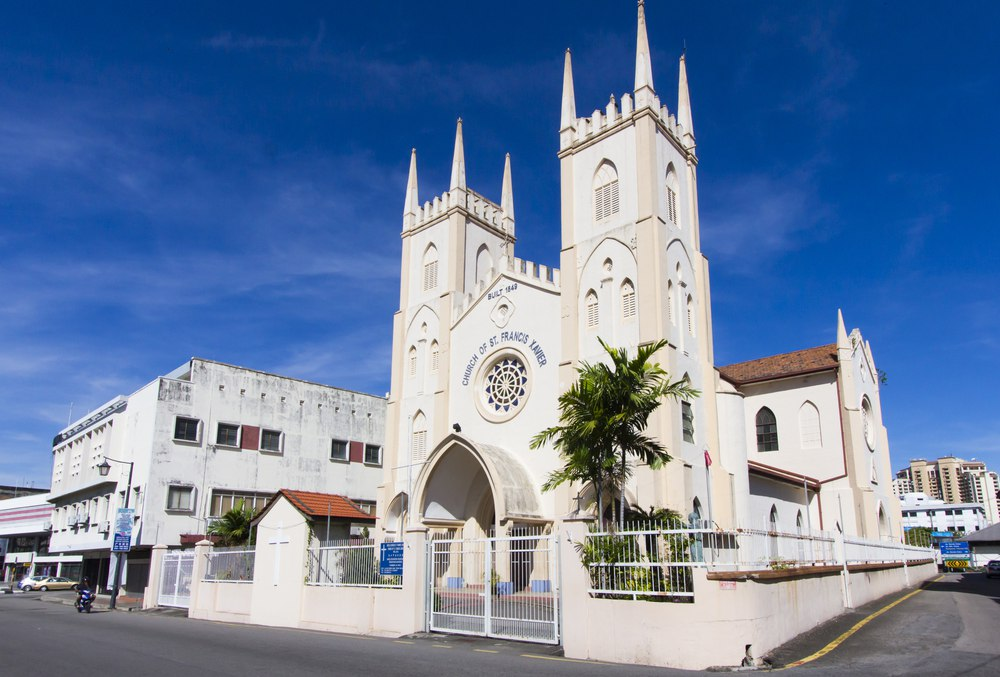
Facade of the Church Of St Francis Xavier

== Features ==
Beneath the church are the tombs of 3 of the priests that served St Francis Xavier's church. The side windows are fitted with stained glass from the early 2000s with the earliest stained glass from the late 1800s placed above the altar depicting the life of St Francis Xavier, commissioned from Vietnam. The organ placed on the choir loft was donated in the early 1900s but has since been left in a state of disrepair.

The 3 stained glasses above the main entrance and the lower window of the two transepts were donated by a generous benefactor in 1999, whereas the remaining of the smaller stained glass windows were made in 2002.

The church also appears to be tilted due to a WW2 bomb that exploded next to the right tower of the church. The church originally had one of the most spectacular high altars in the country but was dismantled in the later years and used for the current altar present.A statue of St Francis Xavier and Yajiro, one of his followers has been placed on the right of the church entrance as a donation from the catholics in Japan.

== See also ==
- List of tourist attractions in Melaka
- Christianity in Malaysia
