= Adrien Devals =

Roman Catholic bishop

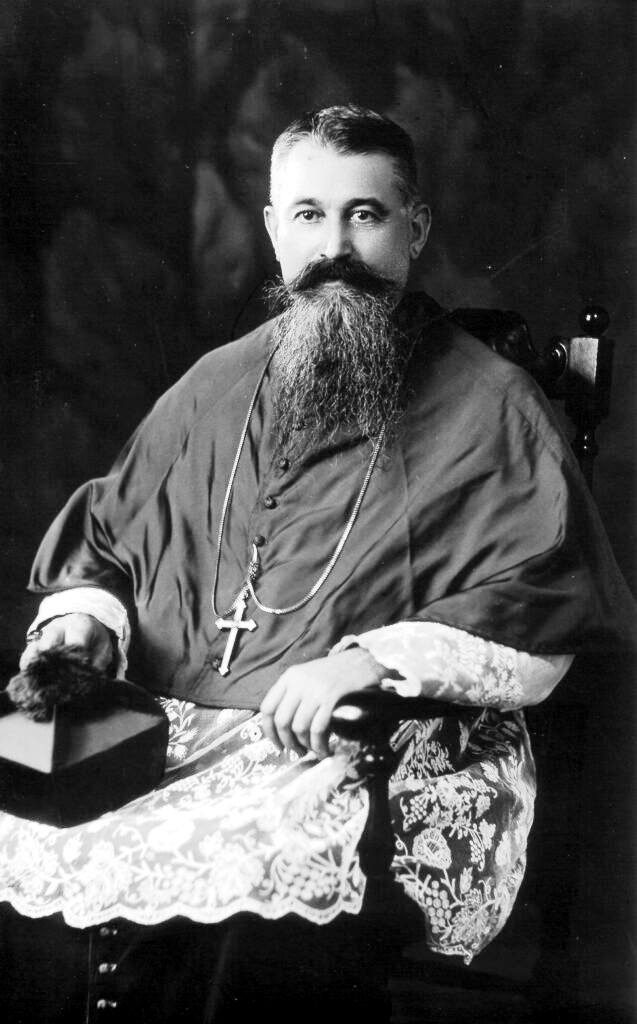

Personal details
- Born: 19 November 1882 Aveyron, France
- Died: 17 January 1945 (aged 62) Seremban, Malaysia

Adrien Devals (19 November 1882 – 17 January 1945) was a French-born Singaporean Roman Catholic priest who was the Bishop of Malacca, which also included Singapore. He was among the first group of settlers to arrive in the Bahau settlement, and was later put in charge of administering the settlement's affairs.

== Early life ==
Devals was born in Aveyron, France on 19 November 1882. He entered the Minor Seminary in Rodez before entering the seminary of the Paris Foreign Missions Society in 1900. On 29 June 1906, he was ordained a priest.

== Malaya ==
Devals arrived in Penang in September, where he became the assistant and later the parish priest at the Church of the Assumption. He returned to France in 1912 following the death of his father. During World War I, he served as a nurse and later as an interpreter in a munitions factory with Chinese workers. He returned to Penang in 1920. On 27 November 1933, he was appointed the Bishop of Malacca. He was consecrated as Bishop on 15 April 1934, and moved to Singapore soon after. In 1935, he established The Malaya Catholic Leader, a Catholic newspaper which was the predecessor of CatholicNews.

Prior the founding of the Bahau settlement as part of the Grow More Food Campaign during the Japanese occupation of Singapore, Devals and Herman De Souza Sr. were sent to the site of the settlement to assess its suitability. In December 1943, he was among the first convoy of settlers to leave for the settlement, and was in charge of administering the settlement's affairs.

== Personal life and death ==
Devals suffered from diabetes. While he was farming in Bahau, he accidentally cut his right foot with a hoe. The cut became infected and turned gangrenous, and he was taken to a hospital in Seremban. Despite having his leg amputated, he died at the hospital on 17 January 1945.
