= René Michel Marie Fée =

French Catholic bishop (1856–1904)

René Michel Marie Fée M.E.P.
- Bishop of Malacca-Singapore
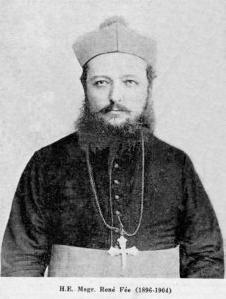
- Church: Roman Catholic Church
- Diocese: Diocese of Malacca-Singapore
- Installed: 21 July 1896
- Term ended: 20 January 1904
- Predecessor: Edouard Gasnier
- Successor: Émile Barillon

Orders
- Ordination: 8 March 1879
- Consecration: 22 November 1896 (as Bishop of Malacca-Singapore)

Personal details
- Born: 5 February 1856 Ambrières, France
- Died: 20 January 1904 (aged 48)
- Buried: Ambrières
- Denomination: Roman Catholic

René Michel Marie Fée MEP (5 February 1856 – 20 January 1904) was a French Catholic missionary who served as Bishop of Malacca-Singapore from 1896 to 1904.

== Early life ==
Fée was born in Ambrières, France on 5 February 1856. For four years he attended the seminaries of Mayenne and Laval before entering the Society of Foreign Missions of Paris where he was ordained a priest in March 1879.

== Career ==
Within a month of ordination, Fée was sent to carry out missionary work in Malaya. Arriving in Singapore in May 1879, he was assigned by Bishop Edouard Gasnier to work amongst the South Indian Tamil community on the Malay Peninsula, and within a month travelled north to Penang. For the next 15 years he worked in the jungle and on the estates of Penang, Province Wellesley and Perak as an unknown priest serving Indian Tamil workers.

In Perak, he cleared the jungle where he established the parish of Bagan Serai, and by 1889 had performed 180 baptisms there, and was ministering to 450 Christians. In 1891, he returned to France due to ill health but returned the following year, and in 1894 established the parish of Teluk Anson. There he built a small wooden church and dedicated it to St Anthony of Padua. In Taiping, he built the Church of St Louis and promoted the establishment of a convent school and orphanages.

In 1896, on the death of Bishop Gasnier, he succeeded to the office of Bishop of Malacca-Singapore, and was consecrated in the Cathedral of the Good Shepherd in Singapore. With residence in Singapore, he opened the Church of the Nativity in Serangoon in 1901, and acquired land which would later become the site of the Church of the Sacred Heart.

In 1903, his health was failing due to throat cancer and he returned to France for treatment but died following an operation on 20 January 1904, and was buried at Ambrières, his birth place.
