= Ceffonds =

- Commune
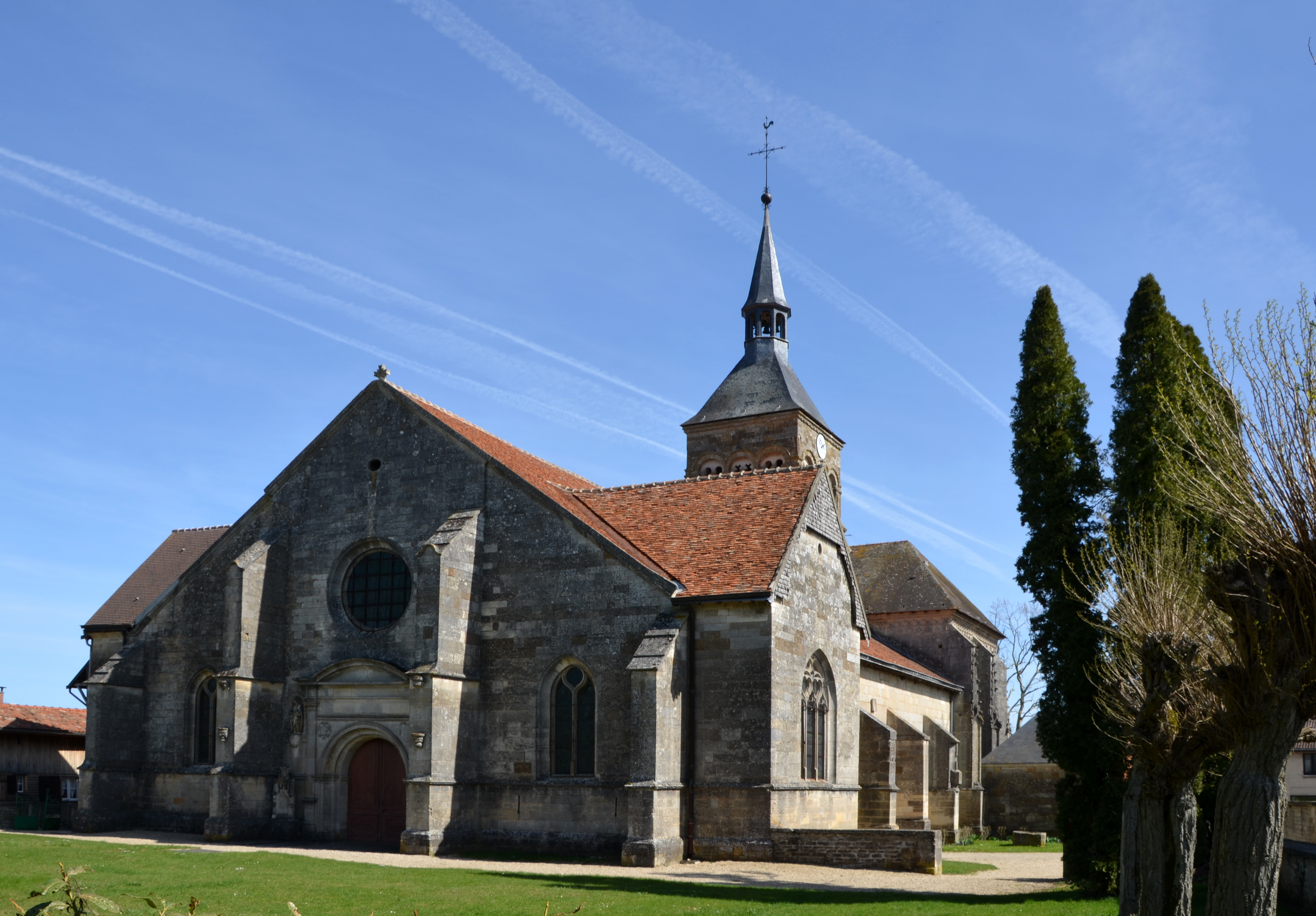
- The church in Ceffonds

- Coat of arms
- Location of Ceffonds
- Location within France Location within Grand Est
- Coordinates: 48°28′15″N 4°45′51″E
- Country: France
- Region: Grand Est
- Department: Haute-Marne
- Arrondissement: Saint-Dizier
- Canton: Wassy
- Intercommunality: CA Grand Saint-Dizier, Der et Vallées

Government
  - Mayor (2020–2026): Éric Krezel
- Area^{1}: 36.52 km^{2} (14.10 sq mi)
- Elevation: 128 m (420 ft)
- Highest elevation: 173 m (568 ft)
- Lowest elevation: 119 m (390 ft)
- Population (2023): 665
  - Density: 18.2/km^{2} (47.2/sq mi)
- Time zone: UTC+01:00 (CET)
  - Summer (DST): UTC+02:00 (CEST)
- INSEE/Postal code: 52088 /52220
- ^{1} French Land Register data, which excludes lakes, ponds, glaciers > 1 km^{2} (0.386 sq mi or 247 acres) and river estuaries.

Ceffonds (French pronunciation: [sefɔ̃]) is a commune in the Haute-Marne department in north-eastern France.

== See also ==
- Communes of the Haute-Marne department
