= James Chan Soon Cheong =

Malaysian Roman Catholic prelate (1926–2023)

His Excellency James Chan Soon Cheong D.D
- Bishop Emeritus of Malacca-Johor
- Archdiocese: Kuala Lumpur
- Diocese: Malacca-Johor
- Installed: 8 June 1973
- Term ended: 10 December 2001
- Predecessor: Michel Olçomendy
- Successor: Paul Tan Chee Ing, SJ

Orders
- Ordination: 9 August 1959
- Consecration: 8 June 1973 by Dominic Vendargon

Personal details
- Born: 26 July 1926 Selama, Perak, Federated Malay States
- Died: 22 April 2023 (aged 96) Johor Bahru, Johor, Malaysia
- Denomination: Roman Catholic
- Motto: "To serve is my joy"
- Coat of arms

Styles of James Chan Soon Cheong
- Reference style: His Excellency; The Most Reverend
- Spoken style: Your Excellency
- Religious style: Bishop

James Chan Soon Cheong
- Traditional Chinese: 曾順祥
- Simplified Chinese: 曾顺祥
- Hanyu Pinyin: Zéng Shùnxiáng
- Hokkien POJ: Chan Sūnsiông

James Chan Soon Cheong (曾顺祥; 26 July 1926 – 22 April 2023) was a Malaysian prelate in the Roman Catholic Church. Born in Selama, Perak, he was ordained a priest on 9 August 1959. He was appointed Bishop of Melaka-Johor on 22 December 1972. His episcopal ordination took place on 8 June 1973. He retired at the age of 75 years on 10 December 2001.

Chan died on 22 April 2023, at the age of 96.

== Life ==
James Chan Soon Cheong attended St. Xavier's Institution in Penang and from 1946, St. George's Institution in Taiping. From 1950 Cheong attended St. Francis Xavier Minor Seminary in Singapore. From 1953 to 1959 he studied philosophy and Catholic theology at the seminary in Penang. On 9 August 1959, he received the sacrament of ordination for the Diocese of Penang.

== See also ==
- Roman Catholic Diocese of Malacca-Johor
- James Chan Soon Cheong at Catholic Hierarchy

Catholic Church titles
Preceded by Michel Olçomendy	Bishop of Melaka-Johor; 1973–2001	Succeeded by Paul Tan Chee Ing
