= Edouard Gasnier =

French Catholic bishop (1833–1896)

Edouard Gasnier M.E.P.
- Bishop of Malacca-Singapore
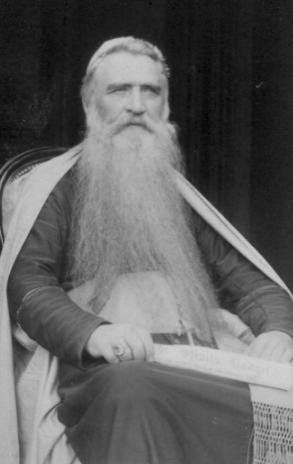
- Church: Roman Catholic Church
- Diocese: Diocese of Malacca-Singapore
- Installed: 10 August 1888
- Term ended: 8 April 1896
- Predecessor: Position newly created
- Successor: René Michel Marie Fée

Orders
- Ordination: 6 June 1857
- Consecration: 10 August 1888 (as Bishop of Malacca-Singapore)

Personal details
- Born: 4 May 1833 Angers, France
- Died: 8 April 1896 (aged 63)
- Buried: Cathedral of the Good Shepherd, Singapore
- Denomination: Roman Catholic

Edouard Gasnier MEP (4 May 1833 – 8 April 1896) was a French Catholic clergyman who served as the Bishop of Malacca-Singapore from 1888 to 1896.

== Biography ==
Born on 4 May 1833 in Angers, France, Edouard Gasnier was ordained as a priest in La Société des Missions Etrangères in 1857, and in the same year was sent to India.

In 1878, whilst serving as Parish Priest of St Patrick's Church, Bangalore, he was appointed titular Bishop of Eucarpia and Vicar Apostolic of Malacca and Singapore.

In 1888, the Diocese of Malacca was restored which raised the Vicar Apostolic of Malacca to a Diocese, and therefore, as Vicar Apostolic, he was elevated to Bishop of Malacca and Singapore.

He served as Bishop of the Diocese of Malacca from his official residence in Singapore until his death on 8 April 1896, and was buried in Cathedral of the Good Shepherd, Singapore.

== See also ==
- Catholic Church in Malaysia
- Roman Catholic Diocese of Melaka–Johor
- Roman Catholic Archdiocese of Singapore
