= Paul Tan Chee Ing =

Malaysian Catholic Bishop

His Excellency Paul Tan Chee Ing S.J.
- Bishop Emeritus of Malacca-Johor
- See: Diocese of Malacca-Johor
- Installed: 15 May 2003
- Term ended: 19 November 2015
- Predecessor: James Chan Soon Cheong
- Successor: Anthony Bernard Paul

Orders
- Ordination: 21 June 1971
- Consecration: 15 May 2003

Personal details
- Born: 5 April 1940 (age 86) Yong Peng, Johor, Unfederated Malay States (now Malaysia)
- Denomination: Roman Catholic

Styles of Paul Tan Chee Ing
- Reference style: Right Reverend
- Spoken style: Your Excellency
- Religious style: Bishop

Paul Tan Chee Ing, (5 April 1940 –) S.J. is the second Catholic Bishop of the Diocese of Malacca-Johor. He was also the president of the Catholic Bishops' Conference of Malaysia, Singapore and Brunei from 2011 to 2012.

== Early life ==
Tan was born on 5 April 1940, in Yong Peng, Johor state of migrants from Fujian province, China. He entered the Jesuit novitiate in Hong Kong in 1959, and furthered his studies in the Philippines and Taiwan before obtaining a Licentiate in Theology (STL) at Milltown Institute of Theology and Philosophy in Dublin, Ireland.

== Education ==
In 1971, he was ordained a priest and began doctoral studies at Ecole des Hautes Etudes in France. His doctoral dissertation on the thoughts of Mao Zedong, founder of China's communist party, was submitted in French and earned him a doctorate cum laude. Bishop Tan is fluent in English, French, Italian, Malay and Mandarin, as well as other Chinese dialects.

== Religious and social work ==
After his studies, he went to Colombia in Latin America for a final year of Jesuit formation. Back in Malaysia, he helped establish the Catholic Research Centre in Malaysia in 1977 to keep Catholics informed about Church teachings on ethics and social issues, for which he was known as a public advocate, as well as on political, social and economic developments in Malaysia.

Tan was also a founder of the Malaysian Consultative Council of Buddhism, Christianity, Hinduism and Sikhism in the early 1980s. Today, the council consults with the government, and vice versa, on laws, policies and other matters affecting non-Muslims.

He is known for his public advocacy on social issues

He has also been active in ecumenism, having served as assistant secretary and later as executive committee member of the Christian Federation of Malaysia until he went to Rome 1992. In Rome, he served as the Jesuit superior general's regional assistant for East Asia and Oceania.

Pope John Paul II appointed him Bishop of Malacca-Johor on 13 February 2003. His episcopal ordination was on 15 May 2003. In January 2011 he became the president of the Catholic Bishops' Conference of Malaysia, Singapore and Brunei.

Pope Francis accepted Bishop Tan's resignation from office (due to reaching the mandatory retirement age of 75) on 19 November 2015. Pope Francis appointed Bishop Anthony Bernard Paul to succeed him.
