= Ambrières =

- Commune
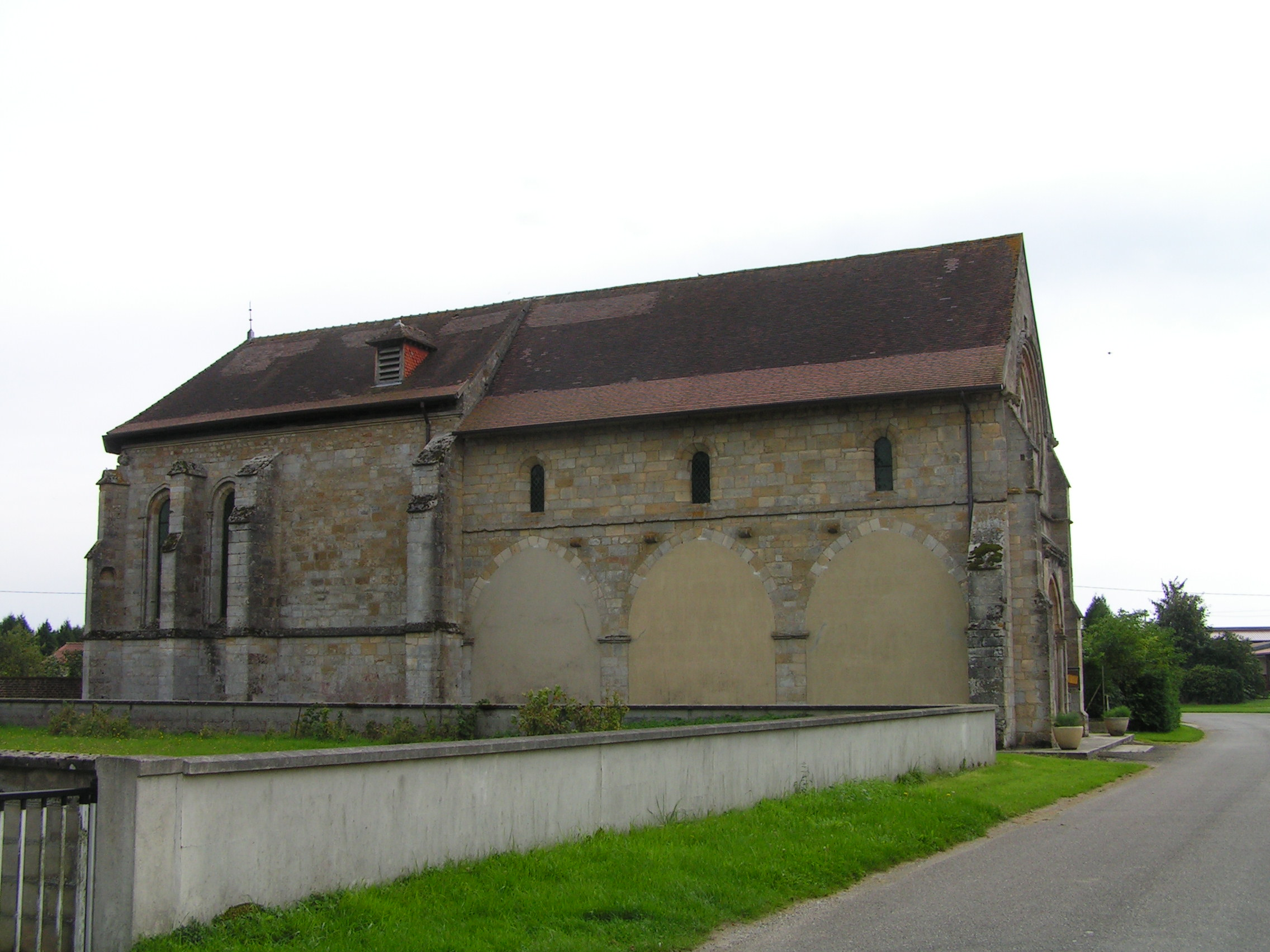
- The church in Ambrières

- Coat of arms
- Location of Ambrières
- Location within France Location within Grand Est
- Coordinates: 48°38′06″N 4°50′18″E
- Country: France
- Region: Grand Est
- Department: Marne
- Arrondissement: Vitry-le-François
- Canton: Sermaize-les-Bains
- Intercommunality: CA Grand Saint-Dizier, Der et Vallées

Government
  - Mayor (2020–2026): Martine Binet
- Area^{1}: 10.07 km^{2} (3.89 sq mi)
- Elevation: 118 m (387 ft)
- Population (2023): 210
  - Density: 21/km^{2} (54/sq mi)
- Time zone: UTC+01:00 (CET)
  - Summer (DST): UTC+02:00 (CEST)
- INSEE/Postal code: 51008 /51290
- ^{1} French Land Register data, which excludes lakes, ponds, glaciers > 1 km^{2} (0.386 sq mi or 247 acres) and river estuaries.

Ambrières (French pronunciation: [ɑ̃bʁijɛʁ]) is a commune in the Marne department in northeastern France.

== Population ==
Historical population
Year	Pop.	±% p.a.
1968	123	—
1975	124	+0.12%
1982	169	+4.52%
1990	227	+3.76%
1999	224	−0.15%
2007	233	+0.49%
2012	214	−1.69%
2017	226	+1.10%
2023	210	−1.22%
Source: INSEE

== See also ==
- Communes of the Marne department
