= St. Peter's Church, Kuching =

Catholic church in Sarawak, Malaysia

- Malay: Gereja St. Peter's, Kuching
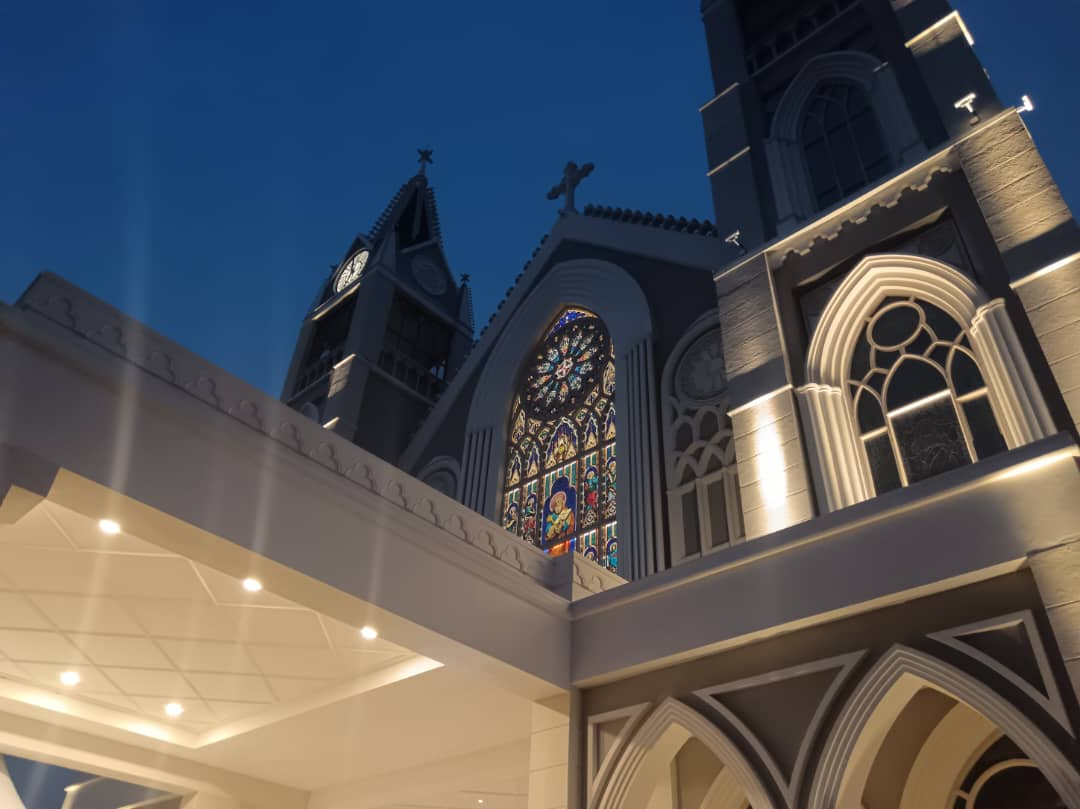
- St. Peter's Church front facade
- St. Peter's Church, Kuching
- 1°33′7.243″N 110°21′31.237″E
- Location: Padungan, Kuching, Sarawak
- Country: Malaysia
- Denomination: Roman Catholic
- Website: stpeterschurchkuching.org

History
- Status: Parish Church
- Founded: 1937
- Dedication: St. Peter the Apostle
- Dedicated: 18 December 1949 (original church); 29 June 2025 (neo-Gothic church)
- Consecrated: 29 June 2025

Architecture
- Architectural type: Gothic
- Years built: 1949; 1960 (reconstruction); 2024 (neo-Gothic church)

Administration
- Archdiocese: Roman Catholic Archdiocese of Kuching

Clergy
- Priest: Rev Fr. Vincent Chin

St. Peter's Church (Malay: Gereja St. Peter's) is a Neo-gothic Roman Catholic church located in Padungan, Kuching of Sarawak, Malaysia. It is the latest and largest church in the city.

It takes inspiration from the original St. Joseph's Cathedral gothic structure, built in 1891 and due to structural issues, demolished in 1969.

== History ==
Following the purchase of seven acres of swampland in Padungan by Msgr. Aloysius Hopfgartner in 1937 to foster the growth of the local church in the Raj of Sarawak with a second parish, he initiated the construction but died on 15 May 1949 before its completion. The church was completed by 18 December within the same year and has undergone several further developments by the 1960s to accommodate the growing congregation. In 1987, a multipurpose hall was constructed, and additional renovation was done in 1999 to address structural problems.

Despite this, concerns about its structural integrity continue to haunt, which is exacerbated by the construction of a nearby monsoon drain. This led to the initiation of a new Gothic-inspired church building which began in 2019 with a total estimated cost of RM38 million. Contributions also come from the Sarawak government with an additional RM2 million grant through the Unit for Other Religion (UNIFOR). The new church building first opened its doors for the Midnight Mass on Christmas Eve in December 2024.

On 28 June 2025, the church was officially opened to public and the final financial fund needed was completed. It was finally consecrated on the feast of Sts Peter and Paul on the following day at 29 June with the presence of over 30 priests, 6,000 faithful congregation; as well as Archbishop Simon Poh - Archbishop of the Archdiocese of Kuching, Archbishop Julian Leow Beng Kim - Archbishop of Kuala Lumpur, Cardinal Sebastian Francis - Cardinal of the Diocese of Penang, Bishop Bernard Paul - Bishop of Malacca-Johore Diocese, Archbishop Emeritus John Ha and Archbishop Emeritus Peter Chung, with another mass the next day for the 40th ordination anniversary of Kuching's first local priest from Kuching Seminary - Fr Vincent Chin.

The new church also features an impressive collection of stained glasses that have been handmade and expertly designed by Italians, as well as incorporating the Brooke family crest and the Sarawak emblem in two stained glasses, along with local Dayak motifs showcasing the uniqueness of Sarawak's culture and history.

== Gallery ==
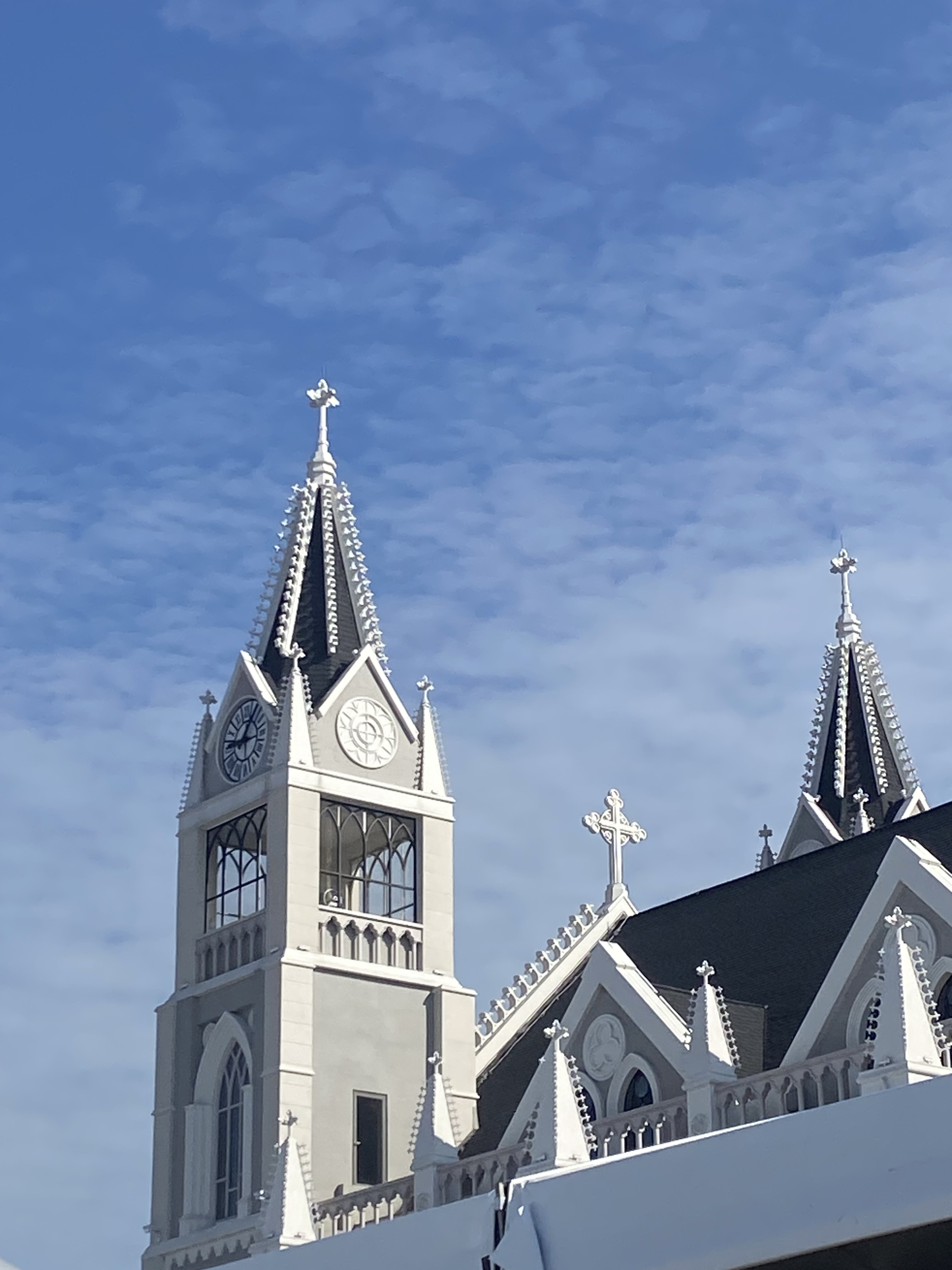
Roof view of the church

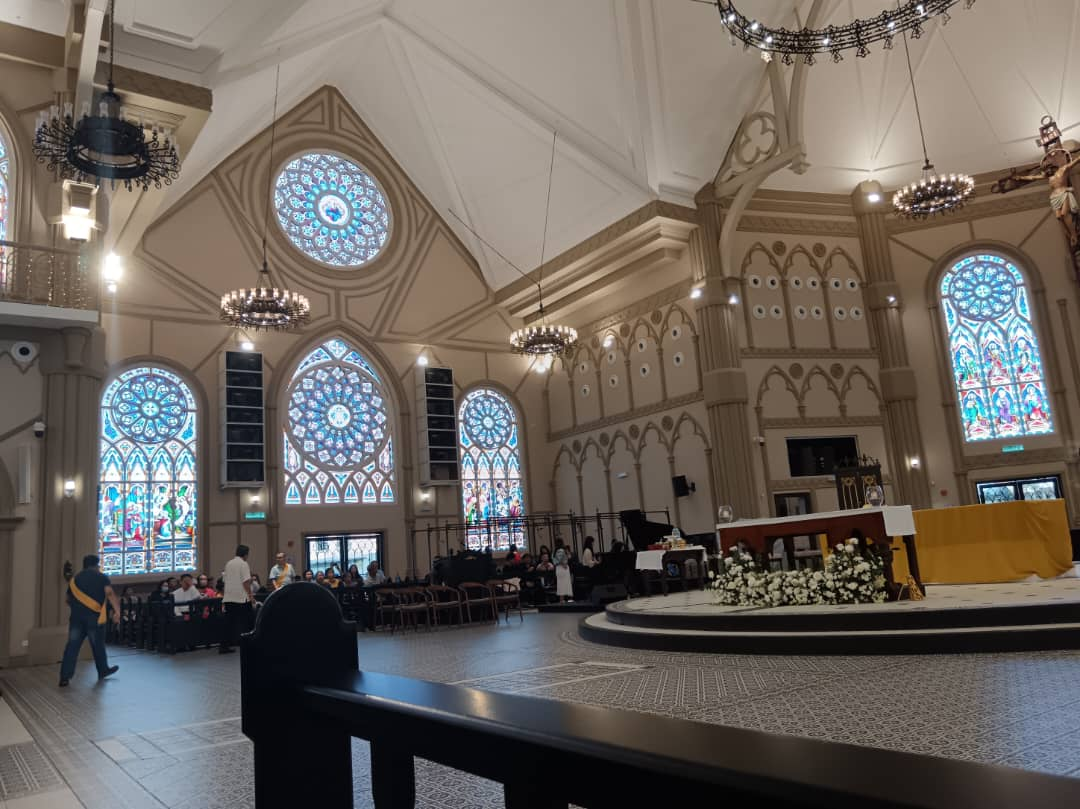
Church altar (current church)

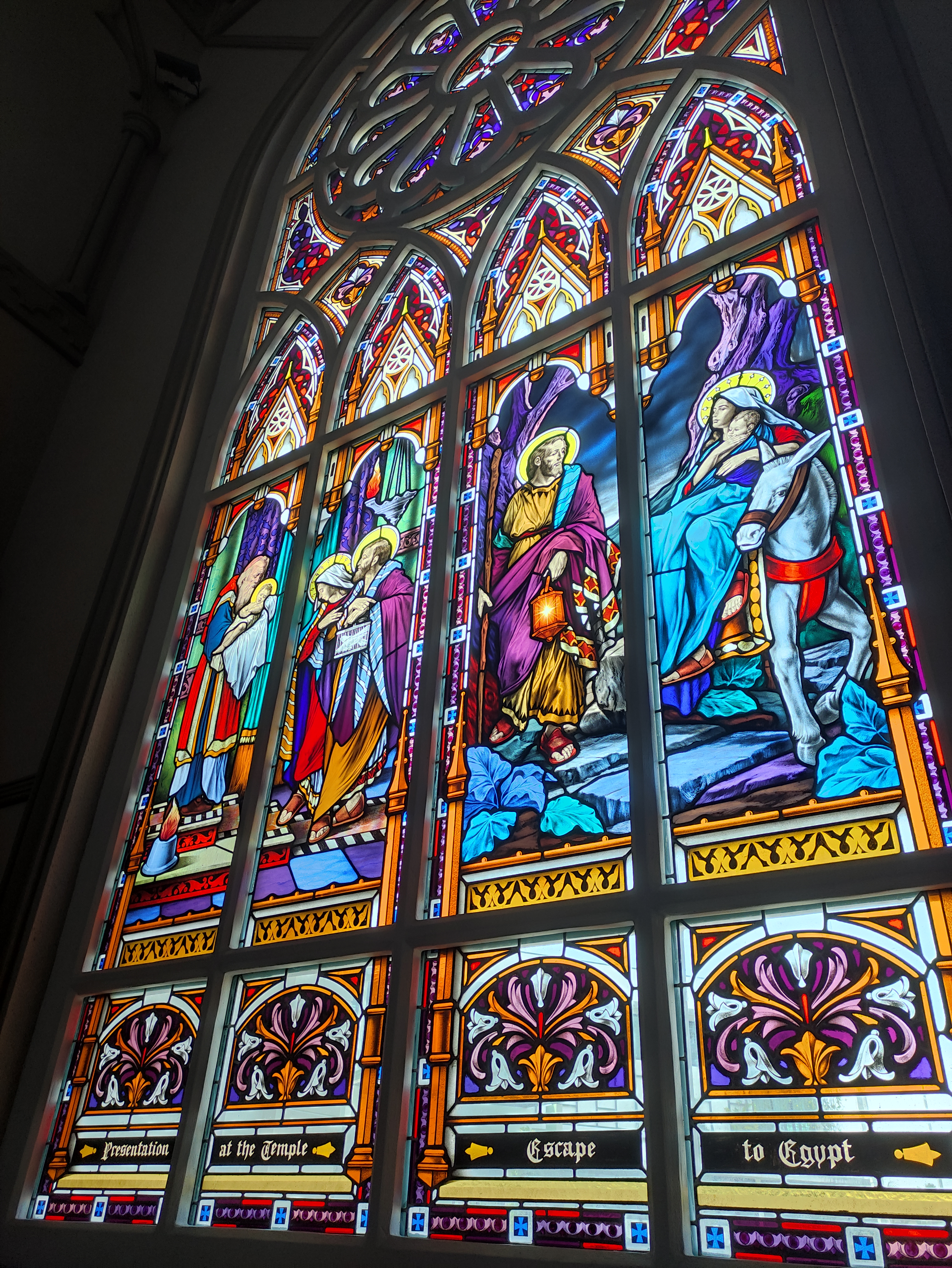
Italian handmade stained glass

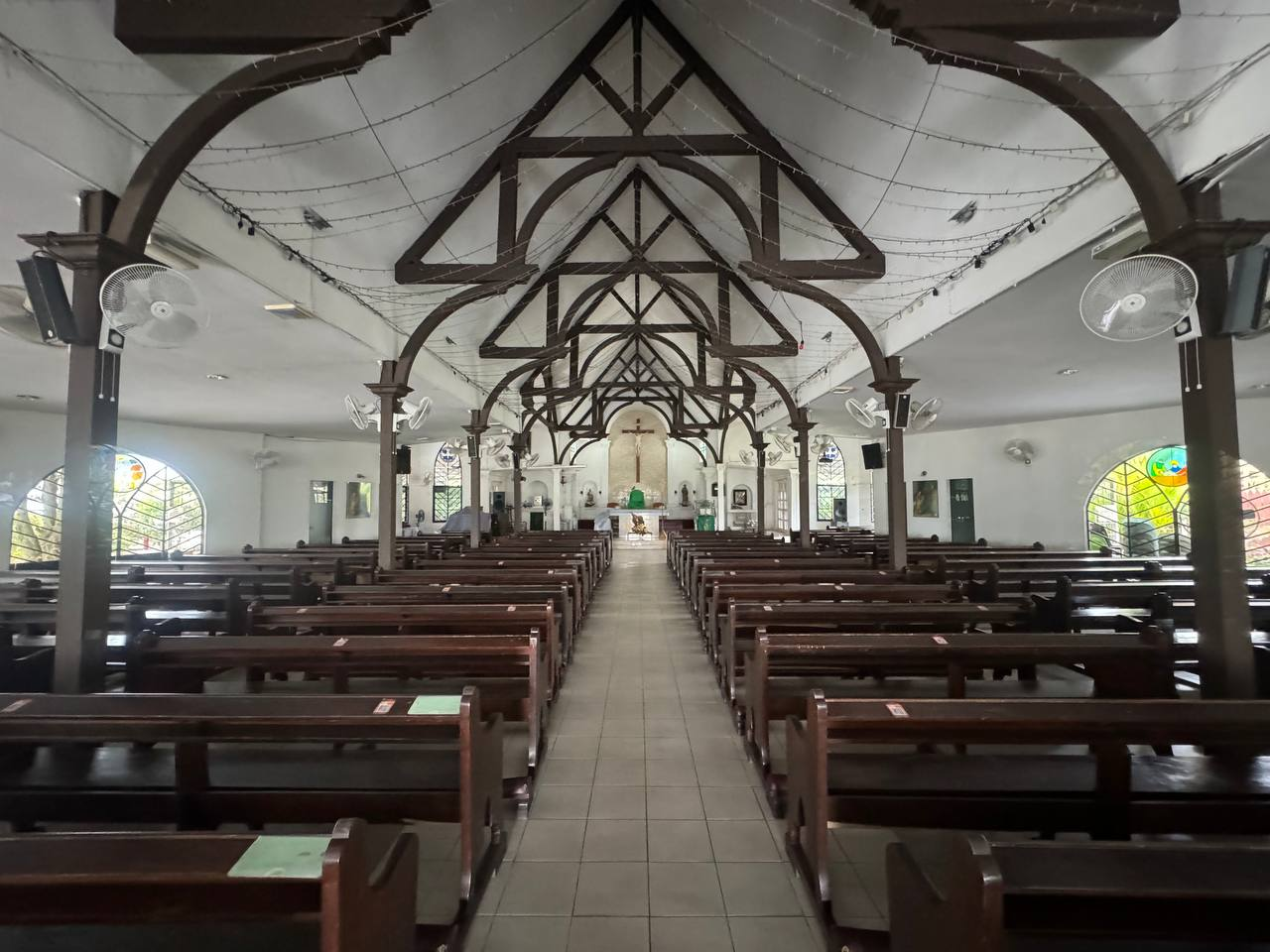
Interior view (old church)

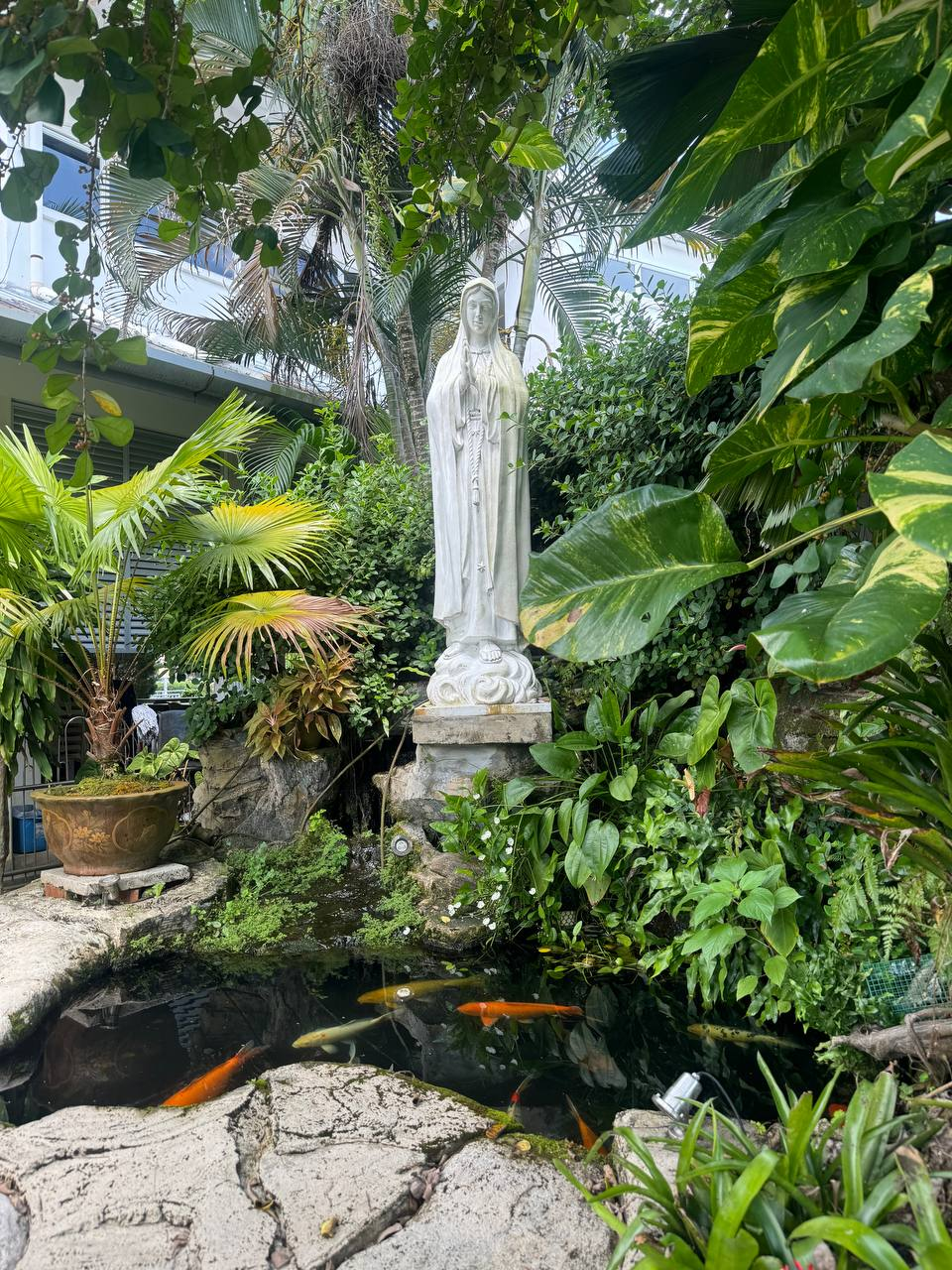
Statue of Virgin Mary on the church compound

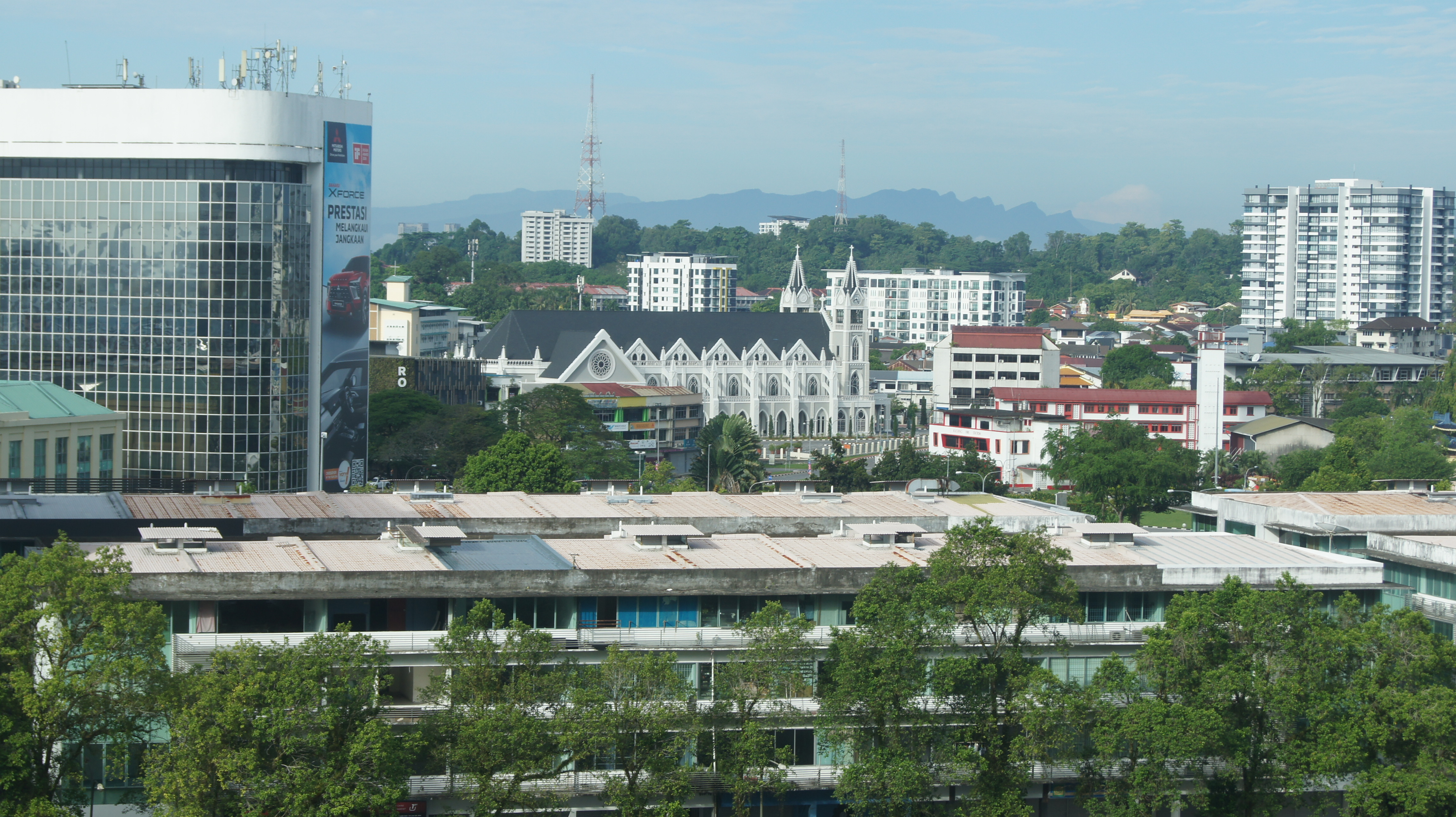
View of St Peter's Church Padungan from Pertanak

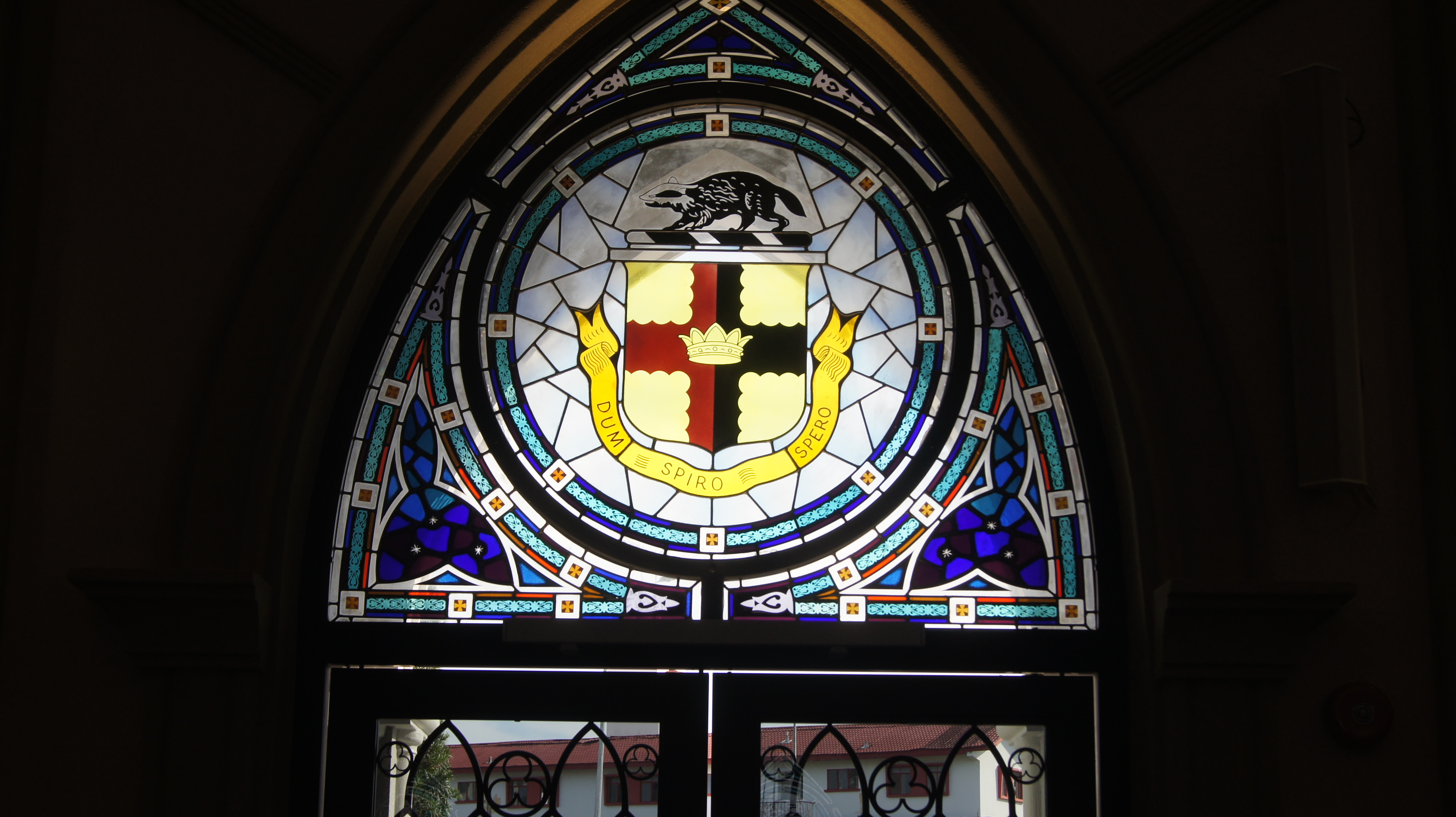
Stained Glass at St Peter's Church Padungan featuring the old Sarawak Emblem used during the Brooke dynasty.

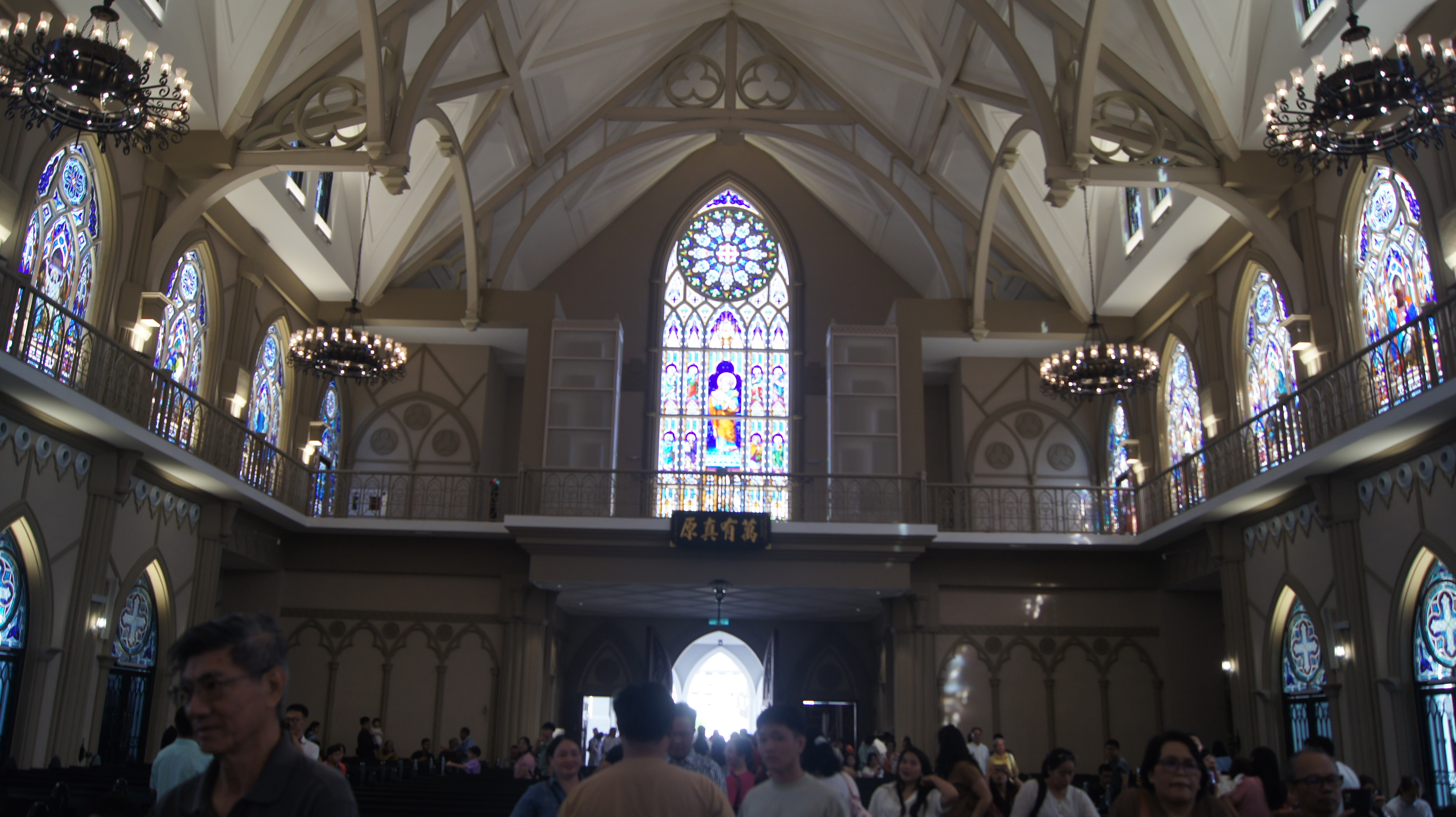
Interior of St Peter's Church Padungan facing front Entrance

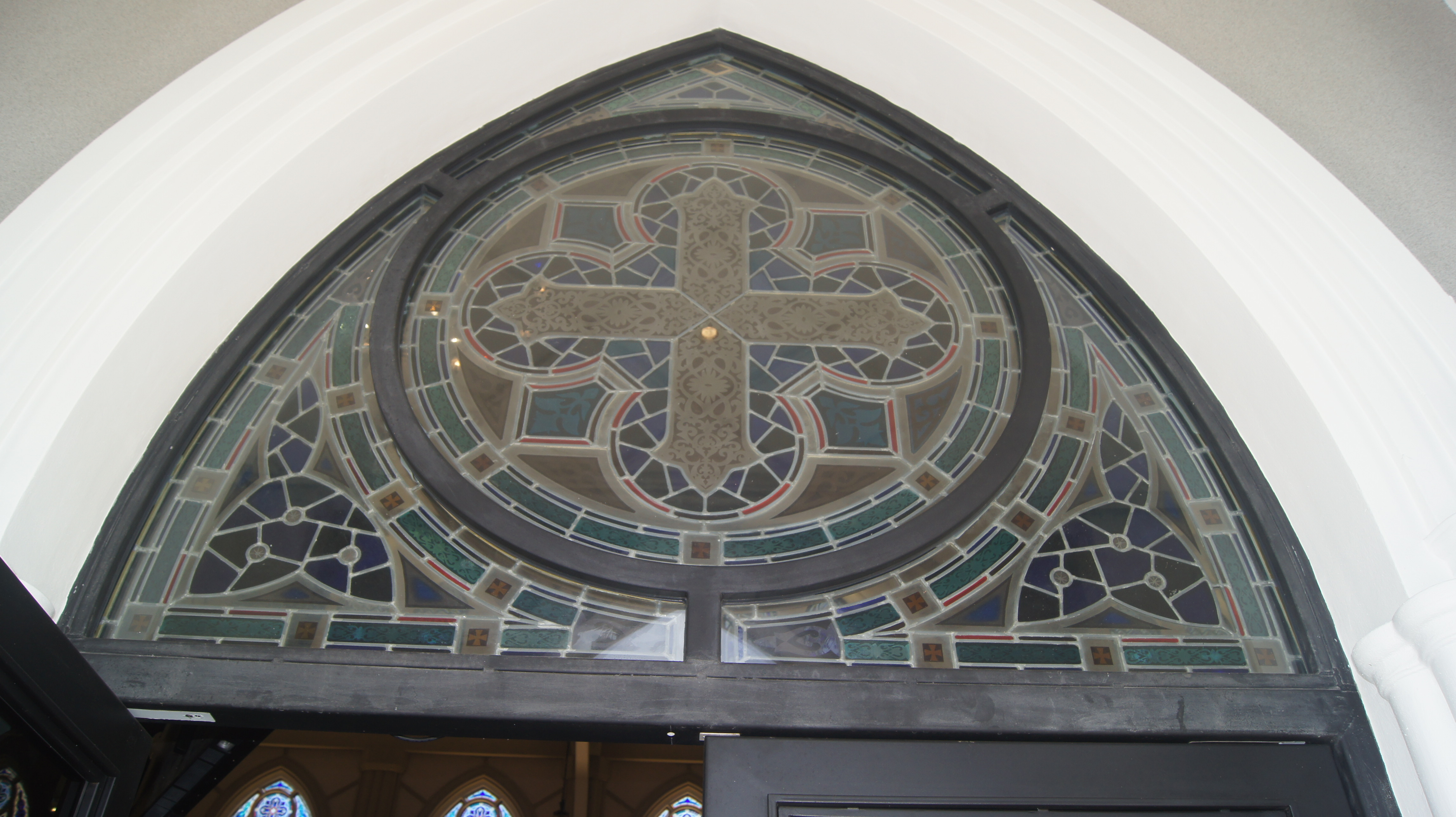
Stained Glass featuring Cross on top of side doors St Peter Padungan

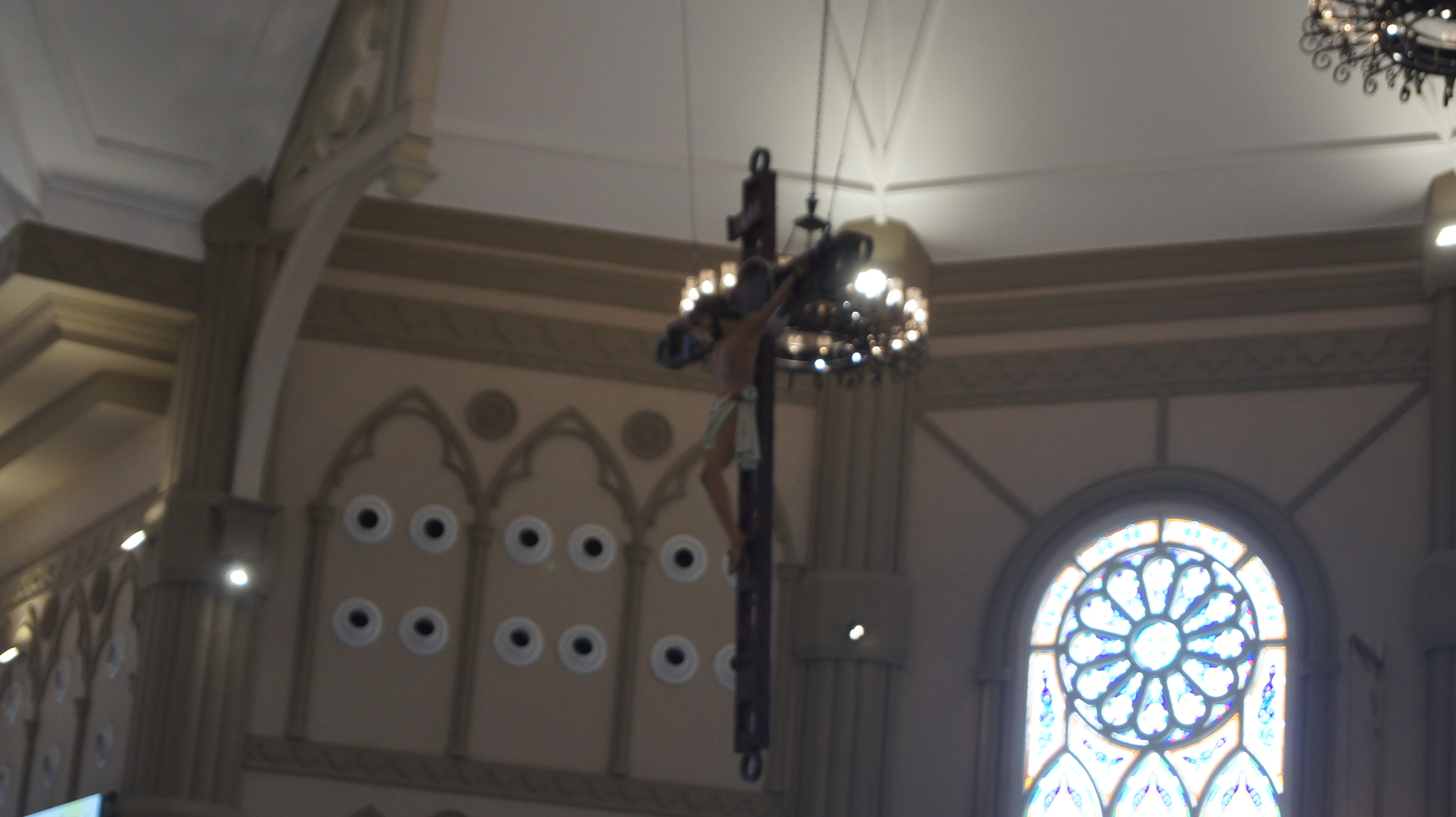
The crucifix at St Peter's Church Padungan, hanging over the altar
