= John Ha Tiong Hock =

Malaysian Archbishop Emeritus of Kuching

His Excellency, The Most Reverend Dato John Ha Tiong Hock PSBS
- Archbishop Emeritus of Kuching
- Church: Roman Catholic Church
- Archdiocese: Kuching
- Appointed: 21 June 2003
- Installed: 16 July 2003
- Term ended: 4 March 2017
- Predecessor: Peter Chung Hoan Ting
- Successor: Simon Peter Poh Hoon Seng
- Previous posts: Auxiliary Bishop of Kuching (1998–2003); Titular Bishop of Canapium (1998–2003)

Orders
- Ordination: 14 December 1972 by Charles Reiterer, MHM
- Consecration: 6 June 1998 by Peter Chung Hoan Ting

Personal details
- Born: 5 March 1947 (age 79) Kuching, Crown Colony of Sarawak, British Empire (now Malaysia)
- Education: Pontifical Biblical Institute (SSL, SSD)
- Motto: Verbum caro factum (Latin for 'The Word was made flesh')

Styles of John Ha Tiong Hock
- Reference style: His Grace
- Spoken style: Your Grace
- Religious style: Archbishop Emeritus

Ordination history of John Ha Tiong Hock
History
Priestly ordination
- Ordained by: Charles Reiterer, MHM
Episcopal consecration
- Principal consecrator: Peter Chung Hoan Ting
- Co-consecrators: Anthony Soter Fernandez & Gregory Yong Sooi Ngean
Episcopal succession
Bishops consecrated by John Ha Tiong Hock as principal consecrator
- Julian Leow Beng Kim: 6 October 2014
- Simon Peter Poh Hoon Seng: 24 September 2015

Dato John Ha Tiong Hock (born 5 March 1947) is a Malaysian prelate of the Roman Catholic Church. He served as the Archbishop of Kuching, from 2003 to 2017. Previously, he served as an auxiliary bishop of the same archdiocese from 1998 to 2003.

== Early life and education ==
Ha was born on 5 March 1947 in Kuching, Sarawak. He studied at St Joseph's Secondary School. At that time, the late Brother Albinus and the late Brother Hilary were instrumental in inspiring him to join the priesthood.

== Ordination and ministry ==
Ha first joined the religious order as a De La Salle brother. However, he decided to join College General in Penang and was ordained to the priesthood on 14 December 1972. He was later sent to Rome, Italy to study at the Pontifical Biblical Institute. He then obtained a Licentiate in Sacred Scripture and later with Doctorate in Sacred Scripture.

After a two-year pastoral work back in the Archdiocese of Kuching, Ha was appointed to teach Bible at College General. After the St. Peter's College seminary was set up in Kuching, he was appointed as its second rector, from 1986 to 1991. He was commissioned to run the Bible Year and served as the rector of the St. Joseph's Cathedral, Kuching. In 1997, he was appointed back to the seminary again.

== Episcopal and ministry ==
=== Auxiliary bishop of Kuching ===
On 17 January 1998, Pope John Paul II appointed Ha as auxiliary bishop of Kuching and titular bishop of Canapium. He received his episcopal consecration on 6 June 1998 from Archbishop Peter Chung Hoan Ting with Cardinal Anthony Soter Fernandez and Archbishop Gregory Yong, serving as co-consecrators.

=== Archbishop of Kuching ===
Coat of arms as Archbishop of Kuching

On 21 June 2003, Ha was appointed Archbishop of Kuching to succeed Archbishop Peter Chung Hoan Ting who resigned upon reaching canonical age. He was installed on 16 July 2003. During his tenure, he was the president of the Malaysia-Singapore-Brunei Episcopal Biblical Commission.

After several years of serving as archbishop, Ha revealed that he was increasingly feeling his age after it gradually showed symptoms. Thus, he saw the need for an auxiliary bishop. He took a considered decision to write a letter to Fernardo Cardinal Filoni, requesting the appointment of an auxiliary bishop. Fr. Simon Peter Poh Hoon Seng was appointed and consecrated in September 2015.

On 4 March 2017, Ha tendered his resignation from the archbishop's office, deliberately coinciding with his seventieth birthday. He took into consideration age 70 as the perfect age for a person to retire. The following day, Pope Francis accepted Ha's resignation and appointed Auxiliary Bishop Simon Peter Poh Hoon Seng as his successor. Ha officially handed over the archdiocese to Poh on the night of 20 March 2017. On the same day, Poh was also installed as the third archbishop of the archdiocese.

== Honour ==
=== Honour of Malaysia ===
- Sarawak
  - Commander of the Most Exalted Order of the Star of Sarawak (PSBS) – Dato (2012)

== See also ==
- Roman Catholic Archdiocese of Kuching

Catholic Church titles
Preceded by Paul Michael Boyle	Titular Bishop of Canapium; 6 June 1998 – 16 July 2003	Succeeded by Jonas Ivanauskas
Preceded by Peter Chung Hoan Ting	Archbishop of Kuching; 16 July 2003 – 4 March 2017	Succeeded by Simon Peter Poh Hoon Seng
