= Simon Peter Poh Hoon Seng =

Malaysian prelate

His Excellency, The Most Reverend Dato Simon Peter Poh Hoon Seng PSBS
- Archbishop of Kuching; President of Catholic Bishops' Conference of Malaysia
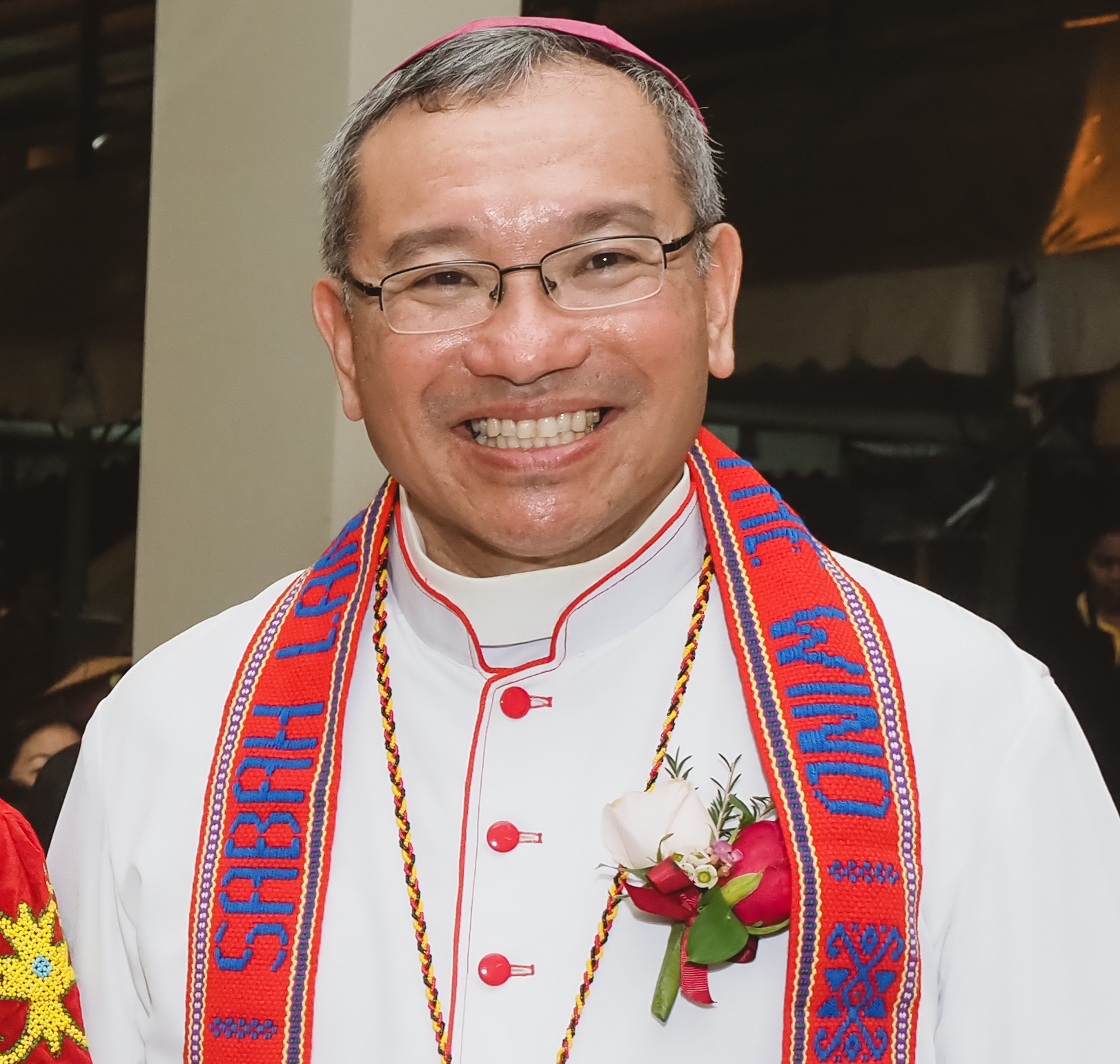
- Poh in 2019
- Church: Roman Catholic Church
- Archdiocese: Kuching
- Appointed: 4 March 2017
- Installed: 20 March 2017
- Predecessor: John Ha Tiong Hock
- Previous posts: Titular Bishop of Sfasferia (2015‍–‍2017); Auxiliary Bishop of Kuching (2015‍–‍2017)

Orders
- Ordination: 31 July 1988 by Peter Chung Hoan Ting
- Consecration: 24 September 2015 by John Ha Tiong Hock

Personal details
- Born: 15 April 1963 (age 63) Simanggang, Crown Colony of Sarawak (present day Sri Aman, Sarawak, Malaysia)
- Parents: Joseph Poh Tong Boo; Geraldine Tay Huang Siew
- Education: Pontifical Urbaniana University; Fu Jen Catholic University; Graduate Theological Foundation
- Motto: Pastor cordis Christi (Latin for 'Shepherd of the heart of Christ')
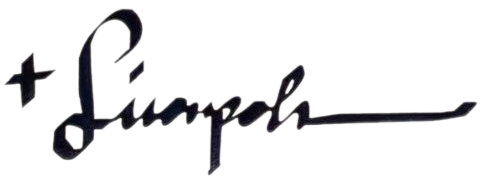
- Signature: Simon Peter Poh Hoon Seng's signature

- Coat of arms: Simon Peter Poh Hoon Seng's coat of arms

Styles of Simon Peter Poh Hoon Seng
- Reference style: His Grace; The Most Reverend
- Spoken style: Your Grace
- Religious style: Archbishop

Simon Peter Poh Hoon Seng
- Simplified Chinese: 傅云生
- Traditional Chinese: 傅雲生
- Hanyu Pinyin: Fù Yúnshēng
- Jyutping: Fu6 Wan4 Saang1
- Hokkien POJ: Pò͘ Hûn-seng
- Tâi-lô: Pòo Hûn-sing

Ordination history of Simon Peter Poh Hoon Seng
History
Priestly ordination
- Ordained by: Peter Chung Hoan Ting
Episcopal consecration
- Principal consecrator: John Ha Tiong Hock
- Co-consecrators: Peter Chung Hoan Ting & Julius Dusin Gitom

Simon Peter Poh Hoon Seng (born 15 April 1963) is a Malaysian Catholic prelate who has been serving as archbishop of the Archdiocese of Kuching since 2017. He served as an auxiliary bishop of the same archdiocese from 2015 to 2017.

== Early life and education ==
Simon Peter Poh Hoon Seng was born on 15 April 1963, in Sri Aman, Sarawak, to Joseph Poh and Geraldine Poh. The oldest child in the family, he has two sisters, Irene and Doreen, and two brothers, Raymond and Norman. From 1970 to 1975, Poh attended St. Joseph's primary school. He then continued his studies at St. Joseph's Secondary School from 1976 to 1982. He and his family converted to Catholicism between the years 1979 and 1980. After becoming a Catholic, Poh joined the school's club, Young Christian Students, the Legion of Mary, and St. Joseph's Cathedral's altar servers.

== Ordination and ministry ==
The parish priest of the church Poh attended at the time, Fr. Josef Wassermann, greatly inspired him due to his commitment and dedication. In 1982, Poh decided to enter the seminary at St. Peter's College Major Seminary, Kuching. During his years as a seminarian, he learnt to master and speak few languages of natives such as Bidayuh, and Iban. At the age of 25, Poh was ordained to the priesthood by Archbishop Peter Chung Hoan Ting on 31 July 1988.

In 1996, Poh obtained a Licentiate in Missiology from the Pontifical Urbaniana University in Rome, Italy. He returned back to Kuching and served as parish rector for four years at St. Ann's Church, Kota Padawan. Poh then became the director of the Commission for Vocations and also served as Spiritual Director of the Commission for Youth.

Poh also worked as Chancellor of the archdiocese, Member of the College of Consultors, Professor of Missiology, and Spiritual Director of St. Peter's College Major Seminary. Besides serving as assistant parish rector of St. Joseph's Cathedral, Kuching, he also coordinated the archdiocesan commission on mission and evangelisation. In 2001, he studied Mandarin at Fu Jen Catholic University in Taiwan.

Poh was officially appointed parish rector of the cathedral in 2012. In 2015, he earned a Doctorate in Ministry from the Graduate Theological Foundation in Indiana, United States.

Poh has spent much of his priesthood guiding members of the Church through the youth ministry. He has spent nearly 20 years ministering to youths and is passionate about youth ministry.

== Episcopal ministry ==
=== Auxiliary bishop of Kuching ===
On 9 July 2015, Pope Francis appointed Poh as auxiliary bishop of Kuching and titular bishop of Sfasferia. He received his episcopal consecration on 24 September 2015 from Archbishop John Ha Tiong Hock with Archbishop Peter Chung Hoan Ting and Bishop Julius Dusin Gitom, serving as co-consecrators.

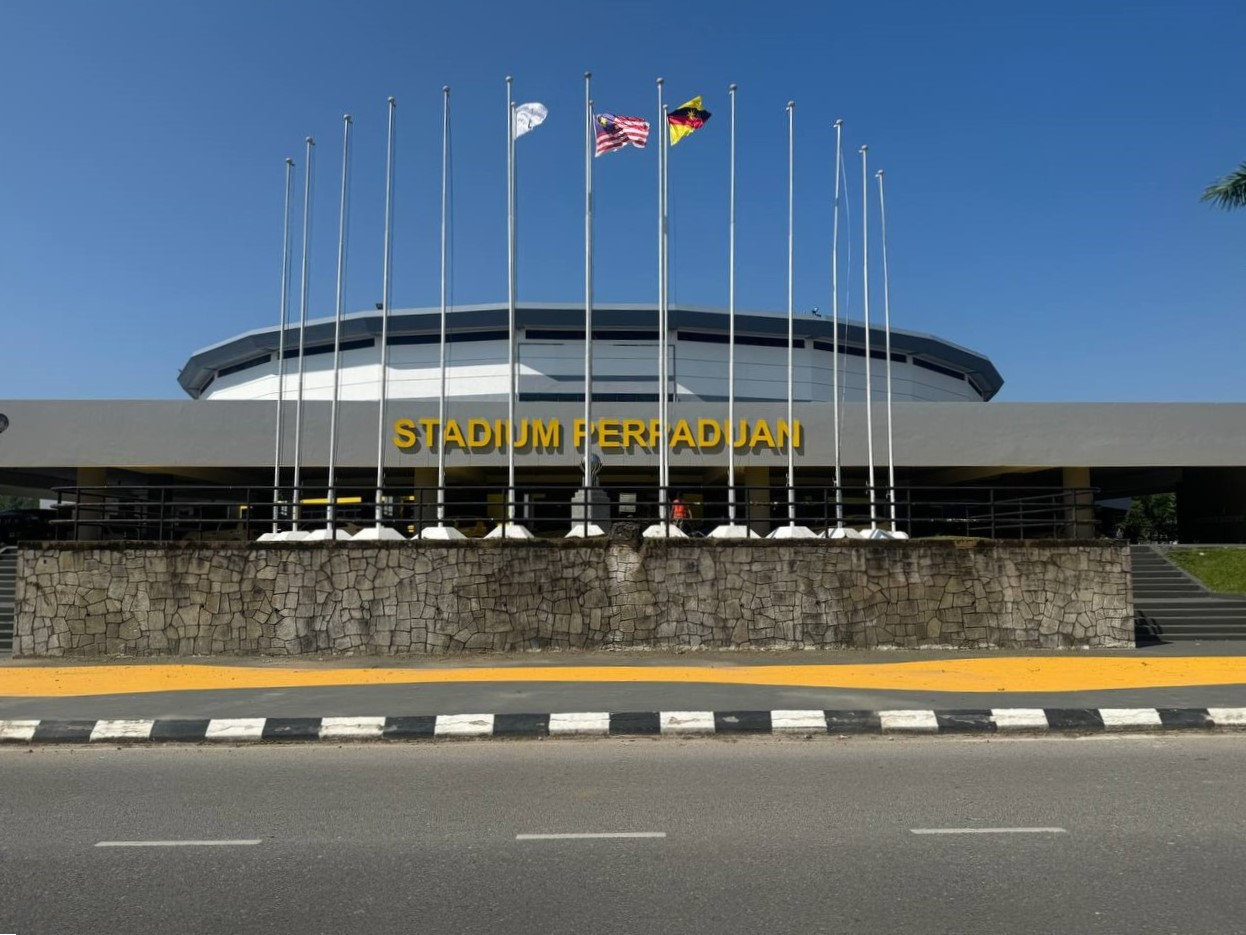
Perpaduan Stadium held the episcopal ordination of Bishop Simon Poh.

=== Archbishop of Kuching ===
On 5 March 2017, Poh was appointed Archbishop of Kuching by Pope Francis to succeed Archbishop John Ha Tiong Hock who resigned for early retirement. He took canonical possession of the diocese and was installed on 20 March 2017.

==== Federal court's ruling ====
On 27 February 2018, after the Federal Court's ruling on apostasy cases in Sarawak, tensions arose outside the courthouse as a group of youths shouted at Poh while he exited the building. As he walked through the crowd, a widely shared video captured the moment when tensions escalated. Despite the charged atmosphere, several individuals, including Muslim youths, quickly stepped forward to protect him. They formed a protective barrier around Poh and escorted him safely to his vehicle. Police later described the incident as minor, explaining that the youths reacted emotionally but that the situation remained under control. They confirmed that no arrests were made and estimated that around 400 people had gathered at the court complex. Following the incident, Poh urged for unity and calm, saying "in Sarawak, we work as friends. Let us not allow emotions to overcome everything." He clarified that the court's decision was based on legal jurisdiction rather than religious conflict and encouraged thoughtful discussions and prayers. He also praised the judges for their neutrality and fairness, stressing the importance of ongoing dialogue and mutual respect, while expressing hope that lawmakers would address the issue fairly.

== Coat of arms ==
Coat of arms of Simon Peter Poh Hoon Seng
| Notes Source Adopted 2017 Escutcheon Bible with text 1 Peter 5:1-11, chalice composed using the Chinese character 聖 with the IHS Christogram, jug with water and baruk icon Motto PASTOR CORDIS CHRISTI (Latin for 'SHEPHERD OF THE HEART OF CHRIST') Symbolism On the shield: Bible with text 1 Peter 5:1-11 – representing the words of the Saint Peter, who is also the patron Saint for Archbishop Poh. In these verses, he speaks to him as a brother bishop and also to those who will be ministering with him.; Chalice – composed using the Chinese character 聖 (Holy), symbolises the Holy Eucharist as "the source and summit of the Christian life" with the IHS Christogram above it. This also represents Archbishop Poh's cultural root.; Jug with water – symbolises the foot washing and ministry of Jesus, the water inside the jug stands for the waters of Baptism.; Baruk icon – baruk is a traditional Bidayuh community house, where the whole village gathers to meet, discuss and worship. This icon represents the indigenous communities in the Archdiocese of Kuching. The design of this icon is based on the tabernacle in St. Joseph's Cathedral, Kuching, with seven steps representing the seven Sacraments. |

== Honour ==
=== Honour of Malaysia ===
- Sarawak
  - Commander of the Most Exalted Order of the Star of Sarawak (PSBS) – Dato (2024)

Catholic Church titles
| Preceded by John Ha Tiong Hock | Archbishop of Kuching; 2017–present | Incumbent |
Titles in pretence
| Preceded by Michael Gorō Matsuura | — TITULAR — Bishop of Sfasferia; 2015–2017 | Succeeded by Job Koo Yobi |
