= Sfasferia =

Former ancient city in Roman North Africa

Sfasferia is a former ancient city and bishopric in Roman North Africa.

== History ==
Sfasferia was one of many cities, important enough in the Roman province of Mauretania Caesariensis, in the papal sway, to become a suffragan bishopric.

Its only historically documented incumbent, bishop Rufus, participated in the synod called at Carthage in 484 by king Huneric of the Vandal Kingdom, after which he was exiled like most Catholic participants, unlike their Donatist heretic counterparts.

It faded completely, even its site somewhere in modern Algeria hasn't been identified.

== Titular see ==
The diocese was nominally restored in 1933 as Latin titular bishopric of Sfasferia (Latin =Curiate Italian) / Sfasferien(sis) (Latin adjective).

It is vacant, having had the following incumbents, so far of the fitting Episcopal (lowest) rank :

- Antonio Silvio Zocchetta, Friars Minor (O.F.M.) (1968.02.16 – death 1973.01.22), first as Auxiliary Bishop of the then Apostolic Vicariate of Mogadishu (Somalia) (1968.02.16 – 1970.10.19), then as last Apostolic Vicar of Mogadishu (now a diocese) (1970.10.19 – 1973.01.22)
- Jean-Baptiste Outhay Thepmany (1975.07.10 – death 1998.03.19) as Apostolic Vicar of Savannakhet (Laos) (1975.07.10 – retired 1997.04.21), also President of Episcopal Conference of Laos and Cambodia (1987 – 1995)
- Michael Gorō Matsuura (ミカエル松浦悟郎) (1999.04.19 – 2015.03.29) as Auxiliary Bishop of Archdiocese of Osaka 大阪 (Japan) (1999.04.19 – 2015.03.29); later Bishop of Nagoya 名古屋 (Japan) (2015.03.29 – ...)
- Simon Poh Hoon Seng (傅雲生) (2015.07.09 – 2017.03.04) as Auxiliary Bishop of Archdiocese of Kuching (Sarawak, Borneo, Malaysia) (2015.07.09 – 2017.03.04); next promoted Metropolitan Archbishop of Kuching (2017.03.04 – ...)
- Bishop-elect Job Koo Yobi (구요비(具要備) 욥) (2017.06.28 – ...), Auxiliary Bishop of Archdiocese of Seoul 서울 (South Korea) (2017.06.28 – ...).

== See also ==
- List of Catholic dioceses in Algeria

== Sources and external links ==
- GCatholic - (former and) titular see, with incumbent bio links

Bibliography

- Pius Bonifacius Gams, Series episcoporum Ecclesiae Catholicae, Leipzig 1931, p. 468
- Stefano Antonio Morcelli, Africa christiana, Volume I, Brescia 1816, p. 276
