= James Buis =

Dutch Catholic bishop (1902–1980)

His Excellency James Buis MHM
- Vicar Apostolic of Kota Kinabalu
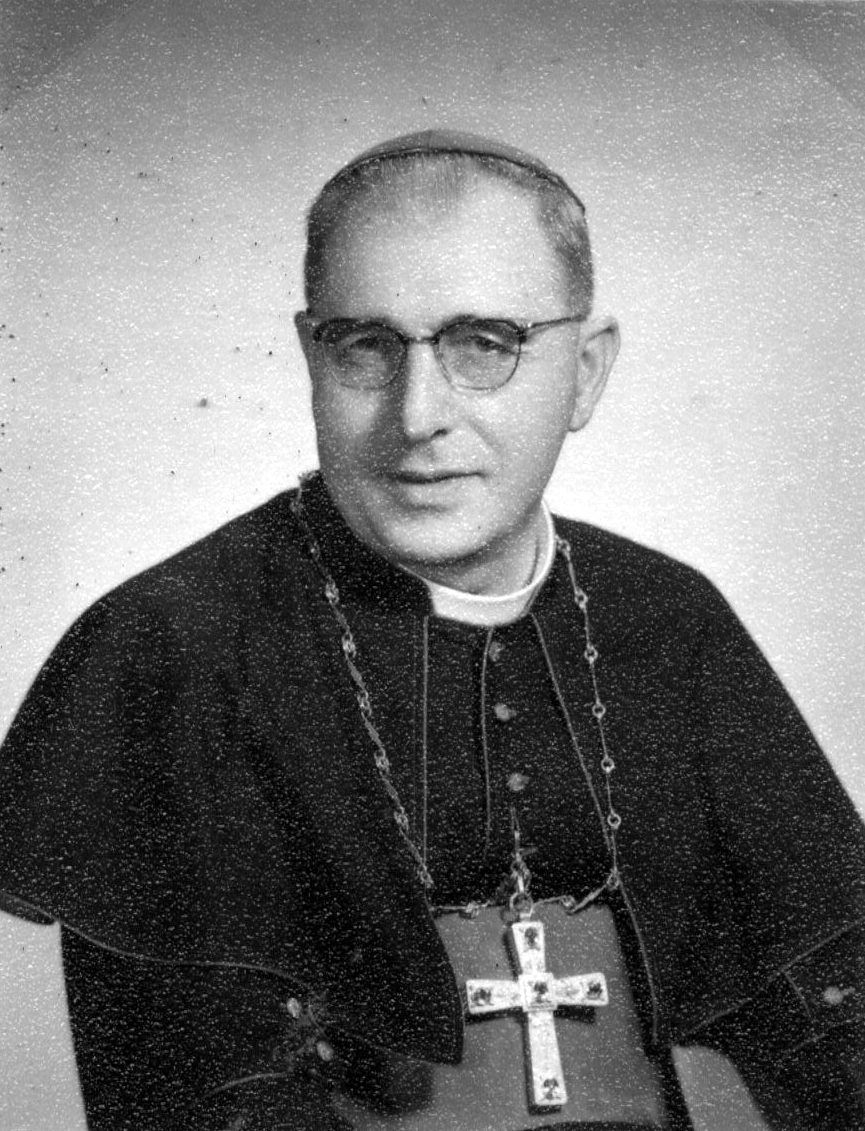
- Metropolis: Kota Kinabalu
- Installed: 18 January 1947
- Term ended: 1 August 1972
- Predecessor: August Wachter
- Successor: Peter Chung Hoan Ting

Orders
- Ordination: 17 July 1927
- Consecration: 1 May 1952 by Johannes Petrus Huibers

Personal details
- Born: 19 June 1902 Leiden
- Died: 24 April 1980 (aged 77) Holland
- Denomination: Roman Catholic
- Motto: In verbo tuo laxabo rete (“At thy word, I will let down the net.”)
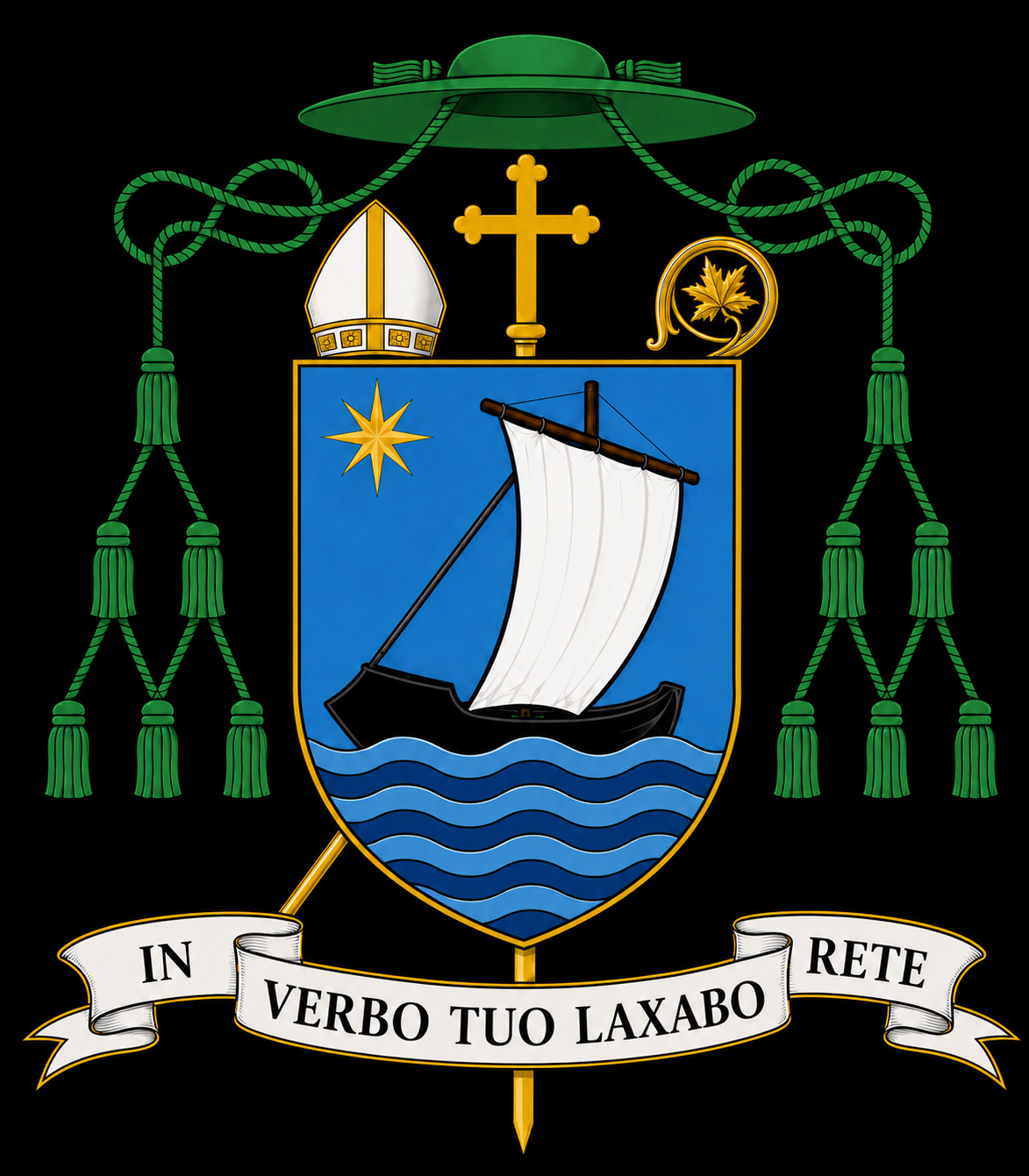
- Coat of arms

James Buis (19 June 1902 – 24 April 1980) was a Dutch Roman Catholic prelate of the Mill Hill Missionaries. He was titular bishop of Astypalaia from 1952 until his death and first Vicar Apostolic of Kota Kinabalu from 1947 to 1972.

Catholic Church titles
Preceded by August Wachter	Vicar Apostolic of Kota Kinabalu; 1947–1972	Succeeded by Peter Chung Hoan Ting
