= Peter Chung Hoan Ting =

The Most Reverend Dato' Sri Peter Chung Hoan Ting PNBS
- Archbishop Emeritus of Kuching
- Church: Roman Catholic
- Archdiocese: Kuching
- Installed: 31 May 1976
- Term ended: 21 June 2003
- Predecessor: Established
- Successor: John Ha Tiong Hock
- Previous posts: Vicar Apostolic of Kota Kinabalu (1972-1975), Titular Bishop of Acelum (1972-1975), Vicar Apostolic of Kuching (1975)

Orders
- Ordination: 26 September 1954 by Jan Vos, MHM
- Consecration: 15 November 1970 by James Buis, MHM

Personal details
- Born: 10 September 1928 (age 98) Laohekou, Hubei, Republic of China
- Denomination: Roman Catholic
- Residence: Mother Mary Priest's Retirement Home, Kuching
- Motto: Gratia cum omnibus
- Coat of arms: Peter Chung Hoan Ting's coat of arms

Styles of Peter Chung Hoan Ting
- Reference style: His Grace
- Spoken style: Your Grace
- Religious style: Archbishop Emeritus

Ordination history of Peter Chung Hoan Ting
History
Priestly ordination
- Ordained by: Bishop John Vos
Episcopal consecration
- Consecrated by: Bishop James Buis
Episcopal succession
Bishops consecrated by Peter Chung Hoan Ting as principal consecrator
- Anthony Lee Kok Hin: 20 November 1977
- John Lee Hiong Fun-Yit Yaw: 26 June 1987
- Cornelius Piong: 6 May 1993
- John Ha Tiong Hock: 6 June 1998

Peter Chung Hoan Ting (born 10 September 1928) is a Malaysian Roman Catholic prelate, who served as a metropolitan archbishop of the Roman Catholic Archdiocese of Kuching, Malaysia from 1976 to 2003, the first archbishop of the diocese.

Chung entered the diocesan minor seminary of the Diocese of Laohekou in 1940. In 1947, he entered the Regional Major Seminary at Hankou. However, in 1949, during the communist insurgency, the entire seminary was moved to Hong Kong and later to Macau. In 1954, he graduated from the seminary and arrived in Kuching for his priestly ordination on 26 September. He was ordained by Bishop John Vos and became the first priest to be ordained in Sarawak. In 1966, he was sent to study canon law in Rome and obtained a Doctorate of Canon Law.

On 1 September 1970, Pope Paul VI appointed Chung as Coadjutor Vicar Apostolic of Kota Kinabalu and Titular Bishop of Acelum. He was consecrated in Kota Kinabalu by Bishop James Buis on 15 November 1970. In 1972, he became the Vicar Apostolic of Kota Kinabalu.

On 30 January 1975, Chung was appointed as Vicar Apostolic of Kuching. The Ecclesiastical Province of East Malaysia was established and Apostolic Vicariate of Kuching was raised to be an archdiocese and Chung became its first archbishop on 31 May 1975. On 21 June 2003, he retired and handed over the archdiocese to his auxiliary bishop, John Ha Tiong Hock.

Catholic Church titles
Preceded by Established	Titular Bishop of Acelum; 15 November 1970 – 31 May 1976	Succeeded by Jean Romary
Preceded by Established	Archbishop of Kuching; 31 May 1976 – 21 June 2003	Succeeded by John Ha Tiong Hock
