= Padungan =

Padungan is a main city area of Kuching, Sarawak, Malaysia.

== Government ==
The Kuching South City Council (MBKS) headquarters is located there.

The state constituency represented in the Sarawak State Legislative Assembly is Padungan (state constituency). The elections were heavily contested in 1983, and 1991.

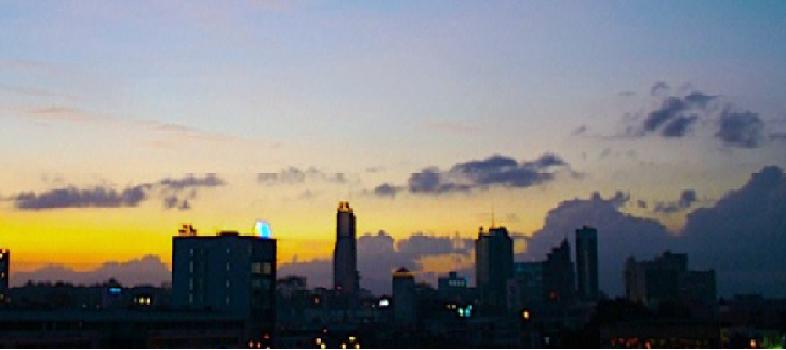
View of Padungan and Kuching City Centre

== Businesses ==
A number of civic associations have had headquarters in Padungan for the past 90 years, with many businesses having offices there. An “industrial estate” and a housing estate were built in the area in 1959. In the 1960s, the area became industrial.

There are a variety of banks, travel agencies, currency exchanges, and related institutions in the neighboring area, and even right on the high street, in the 21st century.

A significant new ecologically friendly hotel has opened, the Roxy Pandungan Hotel.

== Amenities and tourism ==
Tourism in Malaysia has boomed in the 21st century, especially to the islands, including to Kuching. Hotels are being built in the Padungan area.

Padungan became a budget tourism destination for inexpensive food and hostels, as well as its central location in Kuching. In 2014, Rough Guides featured the Nomad hostel and restaurants in the Topspot food court and Pinoy restaurant (serving Philippines cuisine) on Jalan Padungan, the main or high street of the neighborhood. Nightlife and cafe culture has arrived in recent years, as of 2012, pushing aside the traditional karaoke culture. A variety of businesses that cater to tourists have been operating in the area, including currency exchanges, dining options, and cyber cafes.

At both the western and eastern sides of Jalan Padungan are “kitschy” monuments to cats; the city’s name is a homophone of “cat” in the local language.
