= Archdiocese of Kuching =

Latin Catholic archdiocese in Malaysia

Coordinates: 1.5508°N 110.3420°E

Archdiocese of Kuching Archidioecesis Kuchingensis Keuskupan Agung Kuching 古晋总教区

Catholic
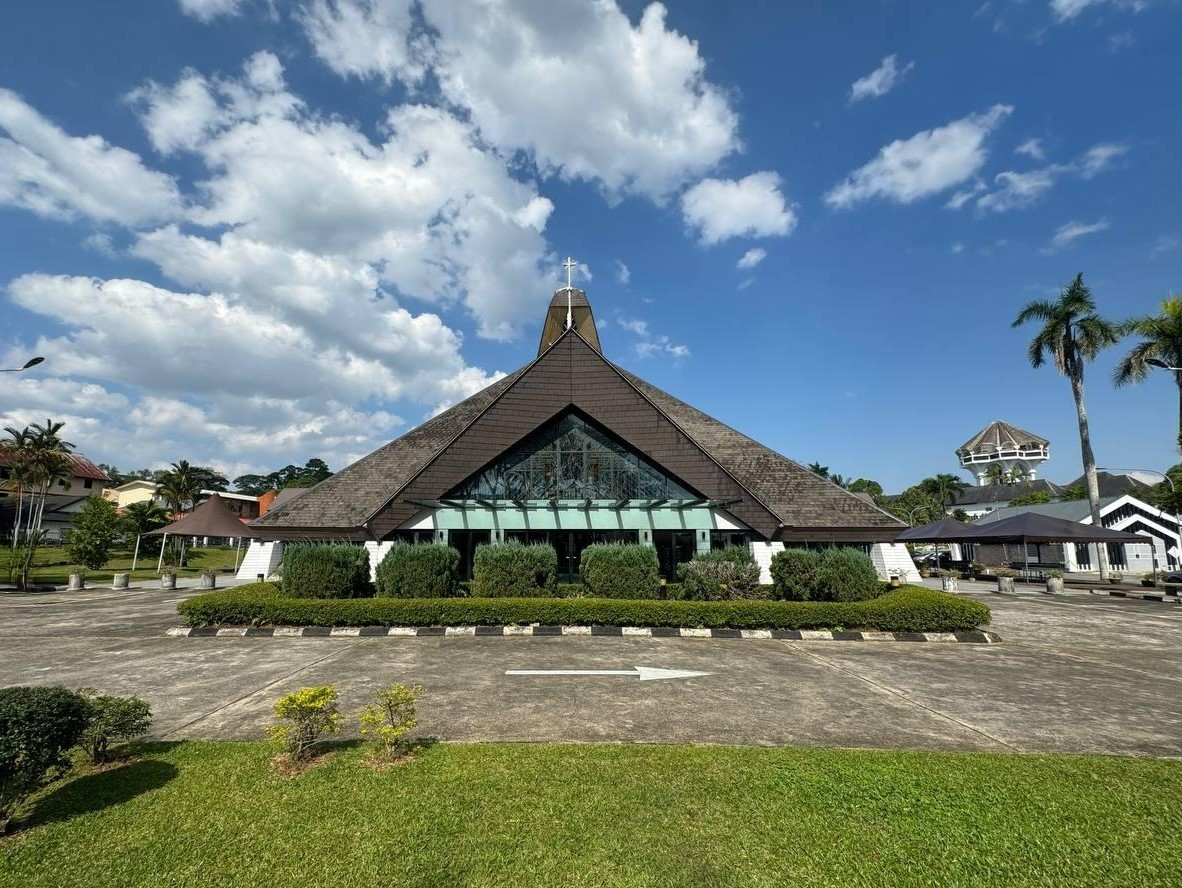
- St Joseph Cathedral, Kuching

- Coat of arms

Location
- Country: Malaysia
- Territory: Kuching, Kota Samarahan, Bau, Serian, Simunjan, Sri Aman, Padawan, Lundu, Betong, Lubok Antu and Saratok
- Episcopal conference: Catholic Bishops' Conference of Malaysia, Singapore and Brunei; Roman Congregation for the Evangelization of Peoples
- Ecclesiastical province: Kuching

Statistics
- Area: 19,173 km^{2} (7,403 sq mi)
- Population: Total; Catholics: (as of 2021); 812,900; 240,575 (38.2%)
- Parishes: 19

Information
- Denomination: Catholic Church
- Sui iuris church: Latin Church
- Rite: Roman Rite
- Established: 1976
- Cathedral: St. Joseph's Cathedral in Kuching
- Patron saint: Saint Joseph
- Language: Ecclesiastical Latin; Bidayuh language; English language; Iban language; Mandarin language; Malay language

Current leadership
- Pope: Leo XIV
- Metropolitan Archbishop: Dato Dr. Simon Peter Poh Hoon Seng
- Suffragans: Diocese of Miri; Diocese of Sibu
- Vicar General: William Sabang
- Episcopal Vicars: Patrick Heng, Chancellor
- Bishops emeritus: Dato John Ha Tiong Hock; Dato' Sri Peter Chung Hoan Ting

Website
- kuchingcatholic.org

The Archdiocese of Kuching (Latin: Archidioecesis Kuchingensis; Malay: Keuskupan Agung Kuching; Mandarin: 古晋总教区) is a Metropolitan Latin archbishopric of the Catholic Church in Kuching, Sarawak, Malaysia, covering the western part of the state, up from Lundu to Saratok. It is however remains dependent on the missionary Roman Congregation for the Evangelization of Peoples.

Its cathedral archiepiscopal see is in St. Joseph's Cathedral, in the city centre, named after the spouse of the Virgin Mary, who was the diocese's patron.

Former auxiliary bishop Simon Peter Poh Hoon Seng was appointed as the third and current Archbishop of Kuching by Pope Francis on 4 March 2017 following the resignation of his predecessor, John Ha Tiong Hock.

Erected in 1927 by Pope Pius XI as an Apostolic Prefecture, Kuching was elevated to Metropolitan Archdiocese by Pope Paul VI in 1976 with the suffragan dioceses of Sibu and Miri, and it was first led by Peter Chung Hoan Ting.

== History ==
- It was erected it as the Apostolic Prefecture of Sarawak by Pope Pius XI on 5 February 1927, on territory split off from the Apostolic Prefecture of Labuan and Borneo.
- It was promoted to the Apostolic Vicariate of Kuching by Pope Pius XII on 14 February 1952.
- Lost territory on 1959.12.19 to establish the Apostolic Vicariate of Miri (now its senior suffragan see of separated Apostolic Vicariate of Brunei Darussalam and Diocese of Miri; by the installation of Anthony Denis Galvin, MHM as its first vicar in 1960, and Anthony Lee Kok Hin as its first bishop in 1977).
- Pope Paul VI elevated it to the rank of a metropolitan archdiocese on 31 May 1976.
- Lost territory on 1986.12.22 to establish the Diocese of Sibu as its second suffragan (by the installation of Dominic Su Haw Chiu as its first bishop).

== Ecclesiastical Province ==
Its ecclesiastical province comprises the Metropolitan's own Archbishopric and the following suffragan sees, both daughter dioceses :

- Diocese of Miri
- Diocese of Sibu.

== Bishops ==
The following are the lists of ordinaries (bishops of the diocese) and auxiliary bishops, and their terms of service. They are followed by other priest of this diocese who became bishop.

=== Apostolic Prefects of Sarawak ===
| No. | Portrait | Name | From | Until | Insignia |
|---|---|---|---|---|---|
| 1 | | Edmund Dunn, MHM (1857-1933) | 1927 | 1935 | |
| 2 | | Aloysius Hopfgartner, MHM (1874-1949) | 1935 | 1949 | |
| 3 | | Jan Vos, MHM (1902-1973) | 1949 | 1952 | |

=== Apostolic Vicars of Sarawak ===
| No. | Portrait | Name | From | Until | Insignia |
|---|---|---|---|---|---|
| 1 | | Jan Vos, MHM (1902-1973) | 1952 | 1968 | |
| 2 | | Charles Reiterer, MHM (1923-1974) | 1968 | 1974 | |
| 3 | | Dato' Sri Peter Chung Hoan Ting (born 1928) | 1975 | 1976 | |

=== Archbishops of Kuching ===
| No. | Portrait | Name | Period in office | Insignia |
|---|---|---|---|---|
| 1 | | Dato' Sri Peter Chung Hoan Ting (born 1928) | 31 May 1976 – 21 June 2003 | |
| 2 | | Dato John Ha Tiong Hock (born 1947) | 16 July 2003 – 4 March 2017 | |
| 3 | | Dato Dr. Simon Peter Poh Hoon Seng (born 1963) | 20 March 2017 – present | |

=== Former Auxiliary Bishops of Kuching ===
- Dato John Ha Tiong Hock (1998–2003), appointed Archbishop of this diocese
- Simon Peter Poh Hoon Seng (2015–2017), appointed Archbishop of this diocese

=== Other priest of this diocese who became bishop ===
- Richard Ng, appointed Bishop of Miri in 2013

== Clergy ==
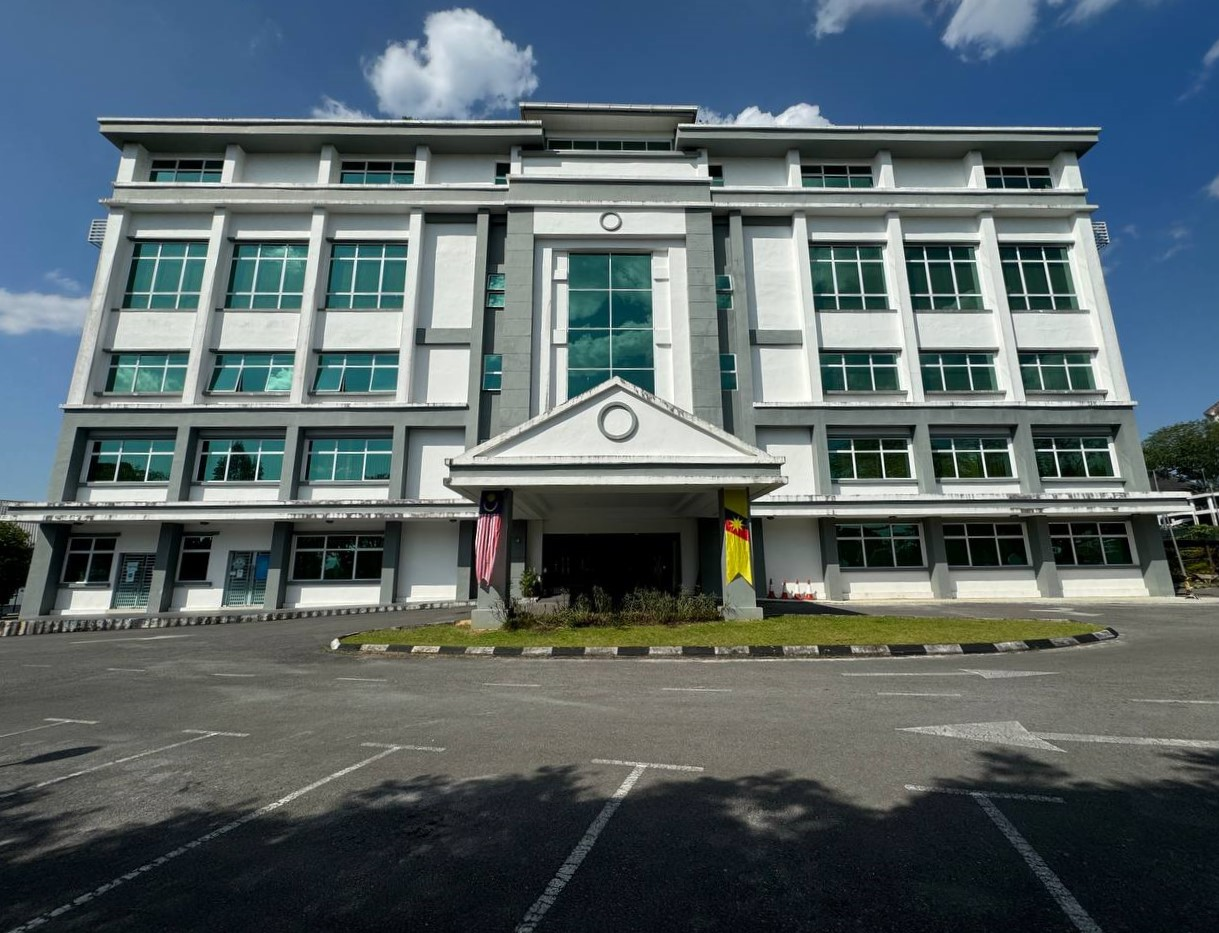
Archdiocesan Curia and Cathedral Pastoral Centre of Kuching.

=== Vicar General ===
- (Sarawak) The Very Rev. Msgr. William Sabang

=== Diocesan Chancellor ===
- (Sarawak) Rev. Fr. Patrick Heng

=== Diocesan Deacons ===
- N/A

=== Diocesan Seminarians ===
- Seminarian Boniface Chang

=== Diocesan Clergies ===
- (Sabah) Rev. Fr. Abel Madisang (Outstationed from Archdiocese of Kota Kinabalu)
- Rev. Fr. Addie Frank Lingge
- (Sarawak) Rev. Fr. Adrian Kho
- (Sarawak) Rev. Fr. Augustine Jepy
- (Sarawak) Rev. Fr. Bernard Jim Bujang
- (Sarawak) Rev. Fr. Casimir Henrry Umar
- (Sarawak) Rev. Fr. Christopher Laden
- (Sarawak) Rev. Fr. Dannie Luis Romanus
- (Sarawak) Rev. Fr. Davie Entalai
- (Sarawak) Rev. Fr. Felix Au
- (Sabah) Rev. Fr. Francis Dakun (Outstationed from Diocese of Keningau)
- (Sarawak) Rev. Fr. Galvin Richard Ngumbang
- (Sarawak) Rev. Fr. Henry Jimbey
- (Sarawak) Rev. Fr. Jerome Juleng
- (Sarawak) Rev. Fr. John Chong
- (Sarawak) Rev. Fr. John Ekly Direk
- (Sarawak) Rev. Fr. Joseph Chai
- (Sarawak) Rev. Fr. Joseph Liew
- (Sarawak) Rev. Fr. Lazarus Swinie
- (Sarawak) Rev. Fr. Leonard Yap
- (Sarawak) Rev. Fr. Mark Noel Bunchol
- (Sarawak) Rev. Fr. Martin Wong
- (Sarawak) Rev. Fr. Nicholas Ng
- (Sarawak) Rev. Fr. Paul Herry
- (Sarawak) Rev. Fr. Paul Ling Keh Yiing (Outstationed from Diocese of Sibu)
- (Sarawak) Rev. Fr. Peter Liston
- (Sarawak) Rev. Fr. Robert Jissem
- (Sarawak) Rev. Fr. Stephen Chin
- (Sarawak) Rev. Fr. Stephen Lim
- (Sarawak) Rev. Fr. Vincent Chin Chu Yang

=== Religious Clergies ===
- (Sarawak) Rev. Fr. David Au, OFM
- (Sabah) Rev. Fr. Don Don Romero Ramerez, OFM (Outstationed from Archdiocese of Kota Kinabalu)
- (Sarawak) Rev. Fr. Joseph Lee Hock Jin, OFM (Outstationed from Diocese of Sibu)
- (Sarawak) Rev. Fr. Joseph Ng, SJ
- (Federal Territories of Malaysia) Rev. Fr. Lucas Ng, CDD (Outstationed from Archdiocese of Kuala Lumpur)
- (Sabah) Rev. Fr. Nelson Evarinus Sipalan, OFM (Outstationed from Diocese of Keningau)

=== Foreign Clergies ===
- Rev. Fr. Agustinus Tanudjaja, SJ (Jesuit missionary from Indonesia)
- Rev. Fr. Albert Jacobse, MHM (Mill Hill missionary from the Netherlands)
- Rev. Fr. Aloysius Dirgahayu Bayu, CDD (CDD missionary from Indonesia)
- Rev. Fr. Andre Delimarta, SDB (Salesian missionary from Indonesia)
- Rev. Fr. Arockyaraj Pavulu, CMF (Claretian missionary from India)
- Rev. Fr. Augustine Radhakanta Singh, CMF (Claretian missionary from India)
- Rev. Fr. Berchmans Rayar, CMF (Claretian missionary from India)
- Rev. Fr. Delphin Kahemba Ndungu, SDB (Salesian missionary from the Democratic Republic of Congo)
- Rev. Fr. Eugenio (Eugene) Gocela Maglasang, SDB (Salesian missionary from the Philippines)
- Rev. Fr. Paul Hu Pi Xian, CDD (CDD missionary from China)
- Rev. Fr. Pratap Baskey, CMF (Claretian missionary from India)
- Rev. Fr. Prince Carneelyes Arockiam, CMF (Claretian missionary from India)
- Rev. Fr. Ramon Borja, SDB (Salesian missionary from the Philippines)
- Rev. Fr. Stanley Goh Yu Ming, SJ (Jesuit missionary from Singapore)

=== Deceased Bishops ===
- Msgr. Edmund Dunn, MHM (1857-1933)
- Msgr. Aloysius (Alois) Hopfgartner, MHM (1874-1949)
- Msgr. John (Jan) Vos, MHM (1902-1973)
- Msgr. Charles (Karl) Reiterer, MHM (1923-1974)

=== Deceased Clergies ===
- Rev. Fr. Peter Aichner, MHM (1914–1995)
- (Sarawak) Rev. Fr. Joachim Pang (1921–2007)
- Rev. Fr. Leopold van Rooyen, MHM (1917–2008)
- (Sarawak) Rev. Fr. Richard Khoo Choon Phoe (1940–2016)
- Rev. Fr. Terence Burke, MHM (1944–2017)
- Rev. Fr. James Meehan, MHM (1933–2018)
- Rev. Fr. Noel Hanrahan, MHM (1928–2019)
- (Sarawak) Rev. Fr. Dato Lawrence Chua (1936–2021)
- Rev. Fr. Michael O'Brien, MHM (1941–2022)
- (Sarawak) Rev. Fr. Peter Ng Kan Lim (1941–2026)

== Statistics and extent ==
As per 2021, it pastorally served 240,575 Catholics (38.2% of 812,900 total) on 19,173 km² in 12 parishes with 37 priests (26 diocesan, 11 religious), 82 lay religious (13 brothers, 69 sisters), 5 seminarians. There is a major seminary of St. Peter.

There are about 19 parishes and chapels administering outstations around the archdiocese.

== Churches ==
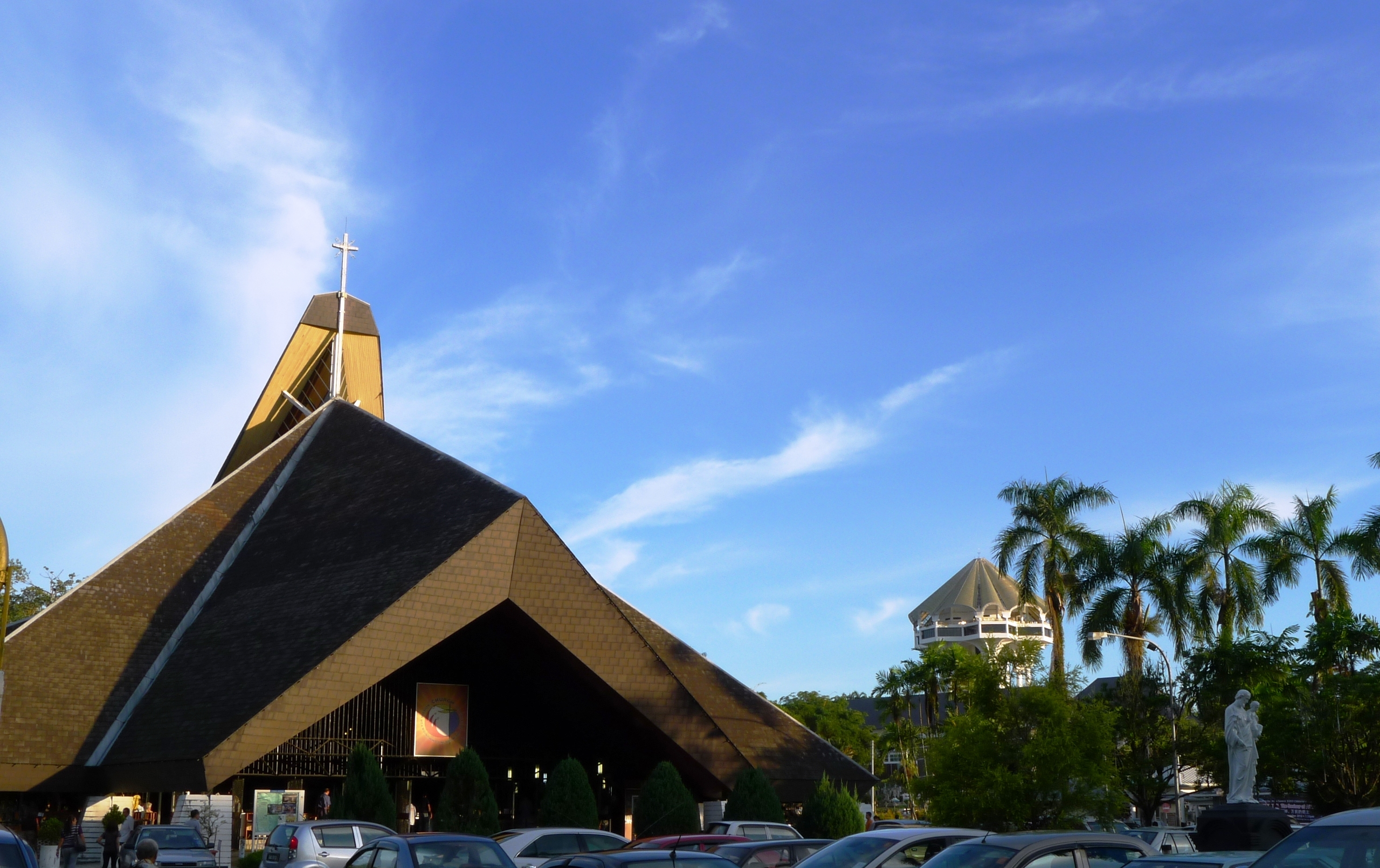
St. Joseph's Cathedral in Taman Budaya, Kuching (old view).

- St. Joseph's Cathedral, Taman Budaya, Kuching
  - sub-parishes of Carmelite Chapel, Jalan Tun Abang Haji Openg, Kuching
  - St. Colette's Catholic Centre, Taman Malihah, Kuching
  - Semariang New Township Catholic Centre, Kuching and
  - Mother Mary Chapel cum Archbishop's residence, Stutong, Kuching

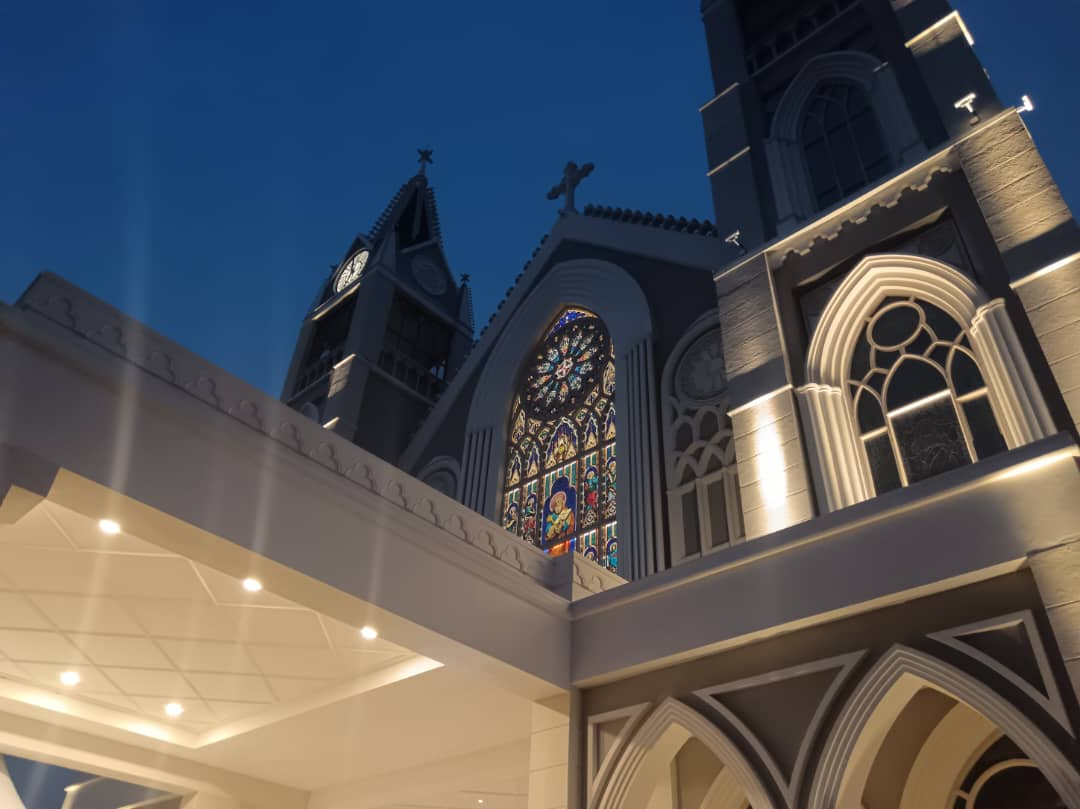
St Peter Padungan new church.

- St. Peter's Church, Padungan, Kuching
  - sub-parish of Our Lady Star of the Sea Church, Bintawa, Padungan, Kuching
- St. Teresa's Church, Serian
  - sub-parishes of Sacred Heart Church, Tebakang, Serian
  - St. Mark's Church, Triboh, Gedong, Serian
  - St. Elizabeth's Church, Ampungan, Serian
  - St. John Bosco's Church, Bintawa Lama, Serian
  - St. Mary's Church, Baru Mawang, Serian
  - St. Andrew's Church, Paon, Serian
  - St. Joseph the Worker's Church, Seroban, Serian
  - St. David's Church, Tong Nibong, Serian
  - St. Peter's Church, Lebor, Gedong, Serian
  - St. Patrick's Church, Tangga, Serian
  - Holy Trinity Church, Pichin, Serian
  - St. John Vianney's Church, Krusen, Serian
  - St. Patrick's Church, Marung, Serian
  - St. Philip's Church, Bugu, Serian
  - St. Henry's Church, Resak, Serian
  - St. Peter's Church, Pridan, Serian
  - St. Sylvester I Church, Mantung Birawan, Serian
  - St. Vincent's Church, Mubuk, Serian
  - St. John's Church, Mantung, Serian
  - St. James' Church, Merian Bedup, Serian
  - St. Daniel's Church, Bedup, Serian
  - St. Pio of Pietrelcina Church, Slabi, Serian
  - St. Thomas' Church, Sorak, Serian
  - All Saints' Church, Koran, Serian
  - St. John's Church, Koran Empaneg, Serian
  - St. Philip's Church, Koran Mawang, Serian
  - St. John Bosco's Church, Sangai Mawang, Serian
  - St. Luke the Evangelist Church, Sangai Empani, Serian
  - St. Lawrence's Church, Jenan, Serian
  - St. Martin de Porres Church, Sira, Serian
  - St. Andrew's Church, Ensebang Kuari, Serian
  - St. Vincent de Paul Church, Ensebang Padang Bilon, Serian
  - St. Bonaventure's Church, Meboi/Merbau, Balai Ringin, Serian
  - St. Lawrence's Church, Kpg. Sg. Engkabang, Serian
  - St. Dominic's Church, Menyang A, Balai Ringin, Serian
  - St. Patrick's Church, Krangan, Balai Ringin, Serian
  - St. Rose of Lima's Church, Antayan Keropok, Balai Ringin, Serian
  - St. Flora's Church, Krait, Serian
  - St. Charles' Church, Rasau, Serian
  - St. Matthew the Apostle Church, Sebangkui, Serian
  - St. Mark the Evangelist Church, Kakeng Karuh, Serian
  - St. Jude's Church, Slabi Sangkam, Serian
  - St. Lucy's Church, Tarat Sibala, Serian
  - St. Paul's Church, Rayang, Serian
  - St. Paul Miki's Church, Merang, Serian
  - St. Paul Miki's Church, Munggu Kopi, Serian
  - St. Sylvester I Church, Sebemban, Gedong, Serian
  - St. James' Church, Murud Plaman, Serian
  - St. Joseph Mikasa's Church, Pati, Serian
  - St. Valencia's Church, Betong Kanowit, Serian
  - St. Richard of Chichester Church, Segenam, Serian
  - St. Jerome of Bethlehem Church, Patung/Kerumboi, Serian
  - St. Peter's Church, Reteh Plaman, Serian
  - St. Ambrose's Church, Reteh Mawang, Serian
  - St. Christopher Magallanes' Church, Tanah Mawang A, Serian
  - St. Cleopas' Church, Kg. Kuala, Gedong, Serian
  - St. Joseph's Church, Semada Belatok, Serian
  - St. Ann's Church, Kakai, Serian
  - St. Joseph's Church, Balai Ringin, Serian
  - St. Monica's Church, Junggu Mawang/Batu Kudi, Balai Ringin, Serian
  - St. Michael's Church, Krangan Jaya, Balai Ringin, Serian
  - St. Michael's Church, Longgo/Merang Bedup, Serian
  - St. Adrian's Church, Semukoi, Serian
  - St. Francis Xavier's Church, Sg. Lingkau, Simunjan
  - St. John Chrysostom's Church, Melanjok, Simunjan and
  - St. Louis' Church, Kuhom, Serian
- St. Stephen's Church, Bau
  - sub-parishes of St. Agnes Tsaou's Church, Grogo, Bau
  - Mary Immaculate Conception Church, Suba, Bau
  - St. Lawrence Ruiz's Church, Suba Buan, Bau
  - St. Patrick's Church, Krokong, Bau
  - St. Francis of Assisi's Church, Seropak, Bau
  - St. Peter Damian's Church, Seromah, Bau
  - St. Edward the Confessor Church, Skio, Bau
  - St. Elizabeth's Church, Sogo, Bau
  - St. Ambrose's Church, Kopit, Bau
  - St. Andrew's Church, Serembu, Bau
  - Holy Trinity Church, Peninjau, Bau
  - St. Thomas More's Church, Kandis Baru, Sg. Pinang, Bau
  - St. Paul's Church, Boka Toya, Sg. Pinang, Bau
  - St. Mathias' Church, Rumih, Bau
  - St. Joseph's Church, Opar, Bau
  - Blessed Sacrament Church, Bijuray/Mongag, Bau
  - St. Faustina Kowalska's Church, Ledan Gumbang, Bau
  - St. Sylvester I Church, Tringgus, Bau
  - St. Philip's Church, Skibang, Bau
  - St. Mark's Church, Stass, Bau
  - St. Leo's Church, Serasot, Bau
  - St. Anthony of Padua's Church, Merembeh, Bau
  - St. Thomas the Apostle's Church, Skiat, Bau
  - St. Barnabas' Church, Skiat Lama, Bau
  - St. Martha of Bethany's Church, Garung, Jalan Wira Penrissen, Kuching
  - St. Teresa de Avila Church, Stenggang, Bau
  - St. Jude's Church, Stum Muda, Bau
  - St. John's Church/Mt. Singai Catholic Memorial & Pilgrimage Centre, Singai, Bau
  - St. Peter's Church, Sippau, Singai, Bau
  - St. Leonard's Church, Atas, Singai, Bau
  - St. James' Church, Bitikie, Singai, Bau
  - St. Michael's Church, Sudoh, Singai, Bau
  - St. Henry's Church, Apar, Singai, Bau
  - Holy Family Woodhouse, Catholic Retreat Centre, Senibong, Singai, Bau
  - St. Andrew Kim Tae-gon Church, Bobak, Singai, Bau
  - St. Martin's Church, Segong, Singai, Bau
  - St. Gonzalo Garcia's Church, Padang Pan, Bau
  - St. Nicholas' Church, Gumbang, Bau
  - St. Paul Miki's Church, Nowang, Bau
  - St. Benedict's Church, Tembawang Sauh, Bau
  - St. Anna's Church, Jugan, Bau
  - St. Francis Xavier's Church, Serikin, Bau
  - St. Mary's Church, Bogag, Serikin, Bau
  - St. Joachim's Church, Segubang, Bau
  - St. Andrew's Church, Sega, Bau
  - St. Felicity's Church, Plaman Buow, Bau
  - St. Lucas the Evangelist Church, Duyoh, Bau
  - St. Matthew the Evangelist Church, Sibuluh, Bau
  - St. Augustine of Hippo Church, Sebobok, Bau
  - Holy Trinity Church, Pries, Bau
  - St. Paul's Church, Ngiramak, Bau
  - St. Claire of Assisi Church, Sibulung, Paku, Bau and
  - Holy Family Church, Podam, Paku, Bau
- St. Jude's Church, Bunan Gega, Serian
  - sub-parishes of Holy Cross, Tebedu, Serian
  - St. Leo, Mujat, Serian
  - St. Bernardette, Mongkos, Serian
  - St. Gabriel the Archangel, Terbat Mawang, Serian
  - St. Jacob, Daha Seroban, Serian
  - St. Peter, Gahat Mawang, Serian
  - St. Joseph, Tesu, Serian
  - St. Mark the Evangelist, Kujang Plaman, Serian
  - St. Nicholas, Daha Mawang, Serian
  - St. Andrew, Daha Kisau, Serian
  - St. Matthew the Apostle, Mapu Tantu, Serian
  - St. Joseph, Temong Mawang, Serian
  - St. Mary, Temong Mura, Serian
  - St. Augustine of Hippo, Kg. Tebedu, Serian
  - St. Simon, Kujang Sain, Serian
  - Gethsemane Pilgrimage Centre, Bunan Gega, Serian
  - St. Jude Thaddeus, Sungan, Tebedu, Serian
  - St. Paul, Tema Saan, Tebedu, Serian
  - St. Henry, Bidak Plaman, Serian
  - Sts. Peter and Paul, Payau Achau, Serian
  - St. John Paul II, Sebintin, Serian
  - St. James, Paon Gahat, Serian
  - St. Anthony, Kawan, Serian
  - St. Francis of Assisi, Mentu Tapu, Serian
  - St. Justin, Mentu Pondok, Serian
  - St. Lawrence, Lobang Batu, Serian
  - Sacred Heart, Pulau Piranuk, Serian
  - St. Martin, Batu Bedang, Serian
  - St. John, Kujang Mawang, Serian
  - St. Elizabeth, Bidak Mawang, Serian
  - St. Aiden, Mawang Tahup, Serian
  - St. William, Payau Burus, Serian
  - St. Timothy, Sejijag, Serian
  - St. Mary, Terbat Leban, Serian and
  - St. Margaretha, Mapu Tragu, Serian

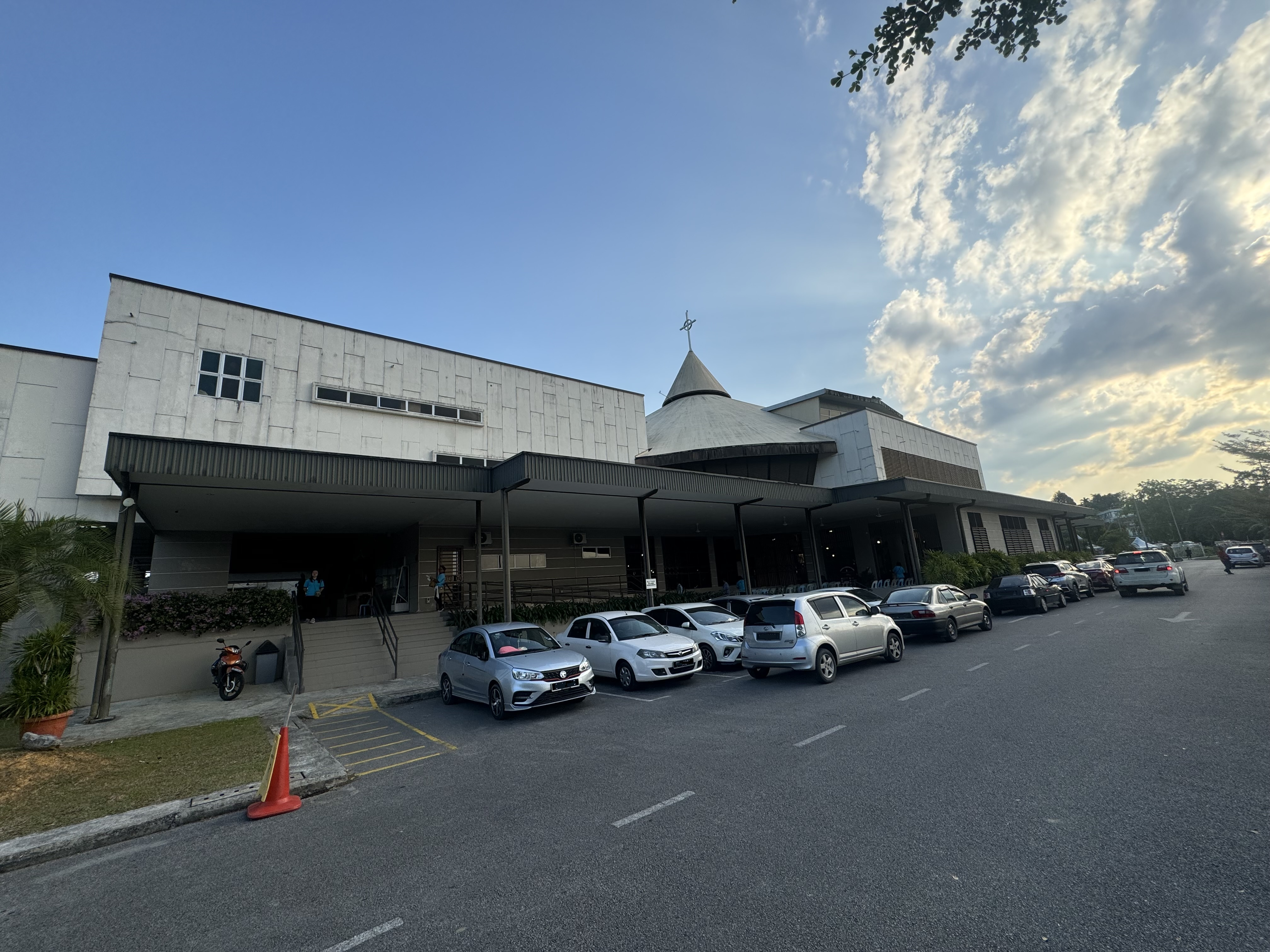
St. Ann's Church in Kota Padawan, also known as Baruk, managed by the Franciscans.

- St. Ann's Church, Kota Padawan, Kuching
  - sub-parishes of St. Peter's Church, Simpok, Kota Padawan, Kuching
  - St. Maximillian Kolbe's Church, Bayur, Kota Padawan, Kuching
  - St. Michael's Church, Teng Bukap, Kota Padawan, Kuching
  - St. Mary's Church, Jambu, Kota Padawan
  - Christ the King Church, Tijirak, Siburan
  - St. Joachim's Church, Batu 12, Kota Padawan, Kuching
  - St. Vincent de Paul Church, Chupak, Kota Padawan, Kuching
  - St. Francis of Assisi's Church, Bidak, Kota Padawan, Kuching
  - St. Clare of Assisi's Church, Payang, Kota Padawan, Kuching
  - St. Agnes' Church, Serumah, Kota Padawan, Kuching
  - St. Andrew's Church, Sitaang, Siburan
  - St. Luke the Evangelist's Church, Petag/Bangau, Siburan
  - St. Anthony of Padua's Church, Peraya, Siburan
  - St. Emily of Vialar Church, Krian, Serian
  - St. Joseph's Church, Gayu, Serian
  - St. Patrick's Church, Masaan, Siburan
  - St. Catherine's Church, Bratan, Siburan
  - Holy Family Church, Punau, Siburan
  - St. Matthew's Church, Benuk, Siburan
  - St. Margaret's Church, Kpg. Betong, Landeh, Siburan
  - Our Lady of Lourdes Church, Sikog/Simboh, Siburan
  - St. Francis Xavier's Church, Seratau, Siburan
  - All Saints Church, PULAPOL, Kuching
  - St. John Baptist Mary Vianney's Church, Prutan, Siburan
  - St. Christopher's Church, Sapit, Kota Padawan, Kuching
  - St. Monica's Church, Kakas, Kota Padawan, Kuching
  - St. James' Church, Tatuk, Kota Padawan, Kuching
  - St. Dominic's Church, Kuang, Serian
  - St. Gerard Majella's Church, Sentah, Siburan
  - St. Joseph's Church RCBM, ILKKM Kuching, Semenggok, Siburan
  - St. Rita of Cascia Church, Pesang, Siburan
  - St. Joseph's Church, Bengoh, Siburan and
  - St. Charles Lwanga Church, Timurang, Puncak Borneo, Kota Padawan, Kuching

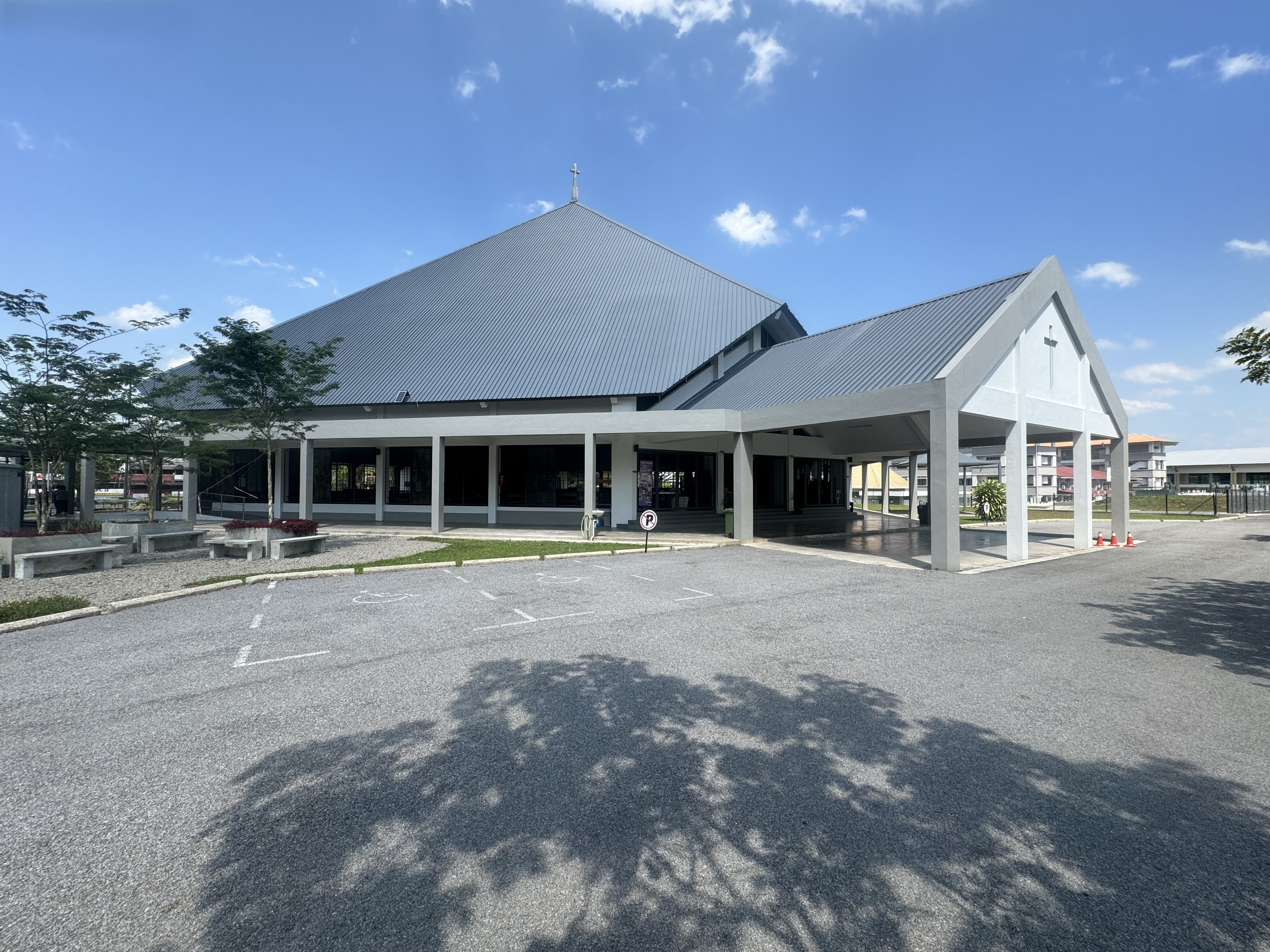
Sacred Heart Church in Kota Sentosa, Kuching.

- Sacred Heart Church, Kota Sentosa, Kuching
  - sub-parish of St. Mark the Apostle's Church, Batu Kawa, Kuching
  - Immaculate Conception Church, Sudat, Kota Sentosa, Kuching
  - Sacred Heart Church, Sarawak Heart Centre, Kota Samarahan
  - St. Joseph's Church, Sg. Empit, Kota Samarahan
  - Assumption of Our Lady Church, Sampun Kelili, Asajaya, Kota Samarahan
  - St. Mary's Church, Bumbok, Batu Kitang, Kuching
  - St. John De Brebeuf Church, Tematu, Kota Sentosa, Kuching and
  - Sacred Heart Church, Semeba, Kota Sentosa, Kuching

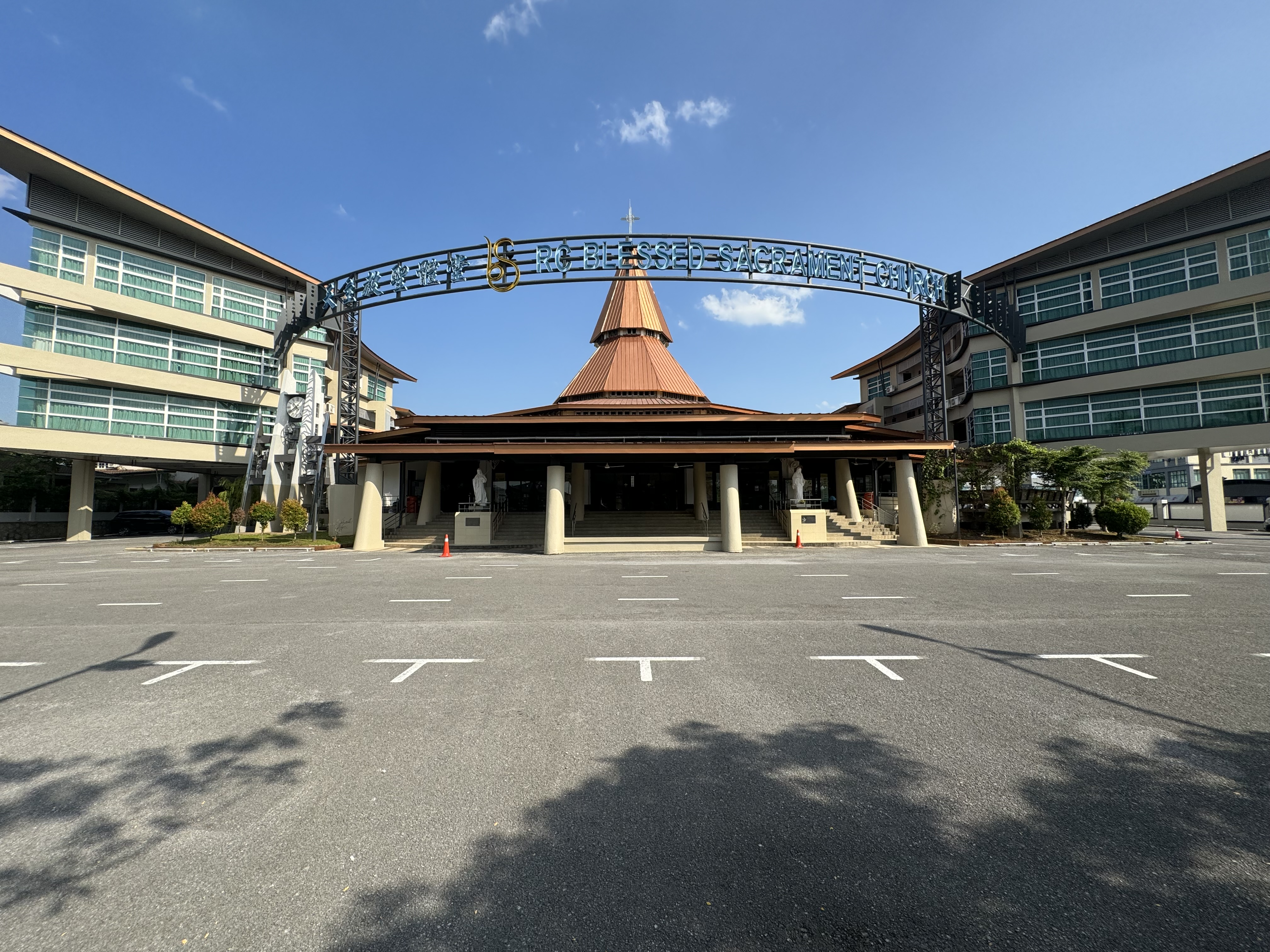
Blessed Sacrament Church in BDC, Stampin, Kuching.

- Blessed Sacrament Church, BDC, Stampin, Kuching
- Holy Spirit Church, Lundu
  - sub-parishes of St. Clement Church, Perian/Senibong, Lundu
  - St. Gregory Church, Selampit/Bitokan, Lundu
  - St. Peter Church, Stungkor Lama, Lundu
  - St. Vincent Church, Stungkor Baru, Lundu
  - St. George Church, Bokah, Lundu
  - St. Mark Church, Rukam, Lundu
  - St. Felix Church, Biawak, Lundu
  - St. Anthony Church, Pasir Ulu, Biawak, Lundu
  - Holy Trinity Church, Jantan, Biawak, Lundu
  - St. Charles Lwanga Church, Jangkar, Biawak, Lundu
  - St. Cosmas Church, Pasir Tengah, Biawak, Lundu
  - St. Christina Church, Kendaie, Biawak, Lundu
  - St. Timothy Church, Sebiris, Lundu
  - St. Mary Church, Serayan/Keranji, Lundu
  - St. Boniface Church, Judin, Lundu
  - St. John Church, Sebako, Lundu
  - St. Simon Church, Sebat Dayak, Sematan, Lundu
  - Good Shepherd Church, Siru/Pueh, Sematan, Lundu
  - St. Louis Church, Raso 1, Lundu
  - St. Catherine Church, Raso 2, Lundu and
  - Holy Family Church, Paon, Lundu

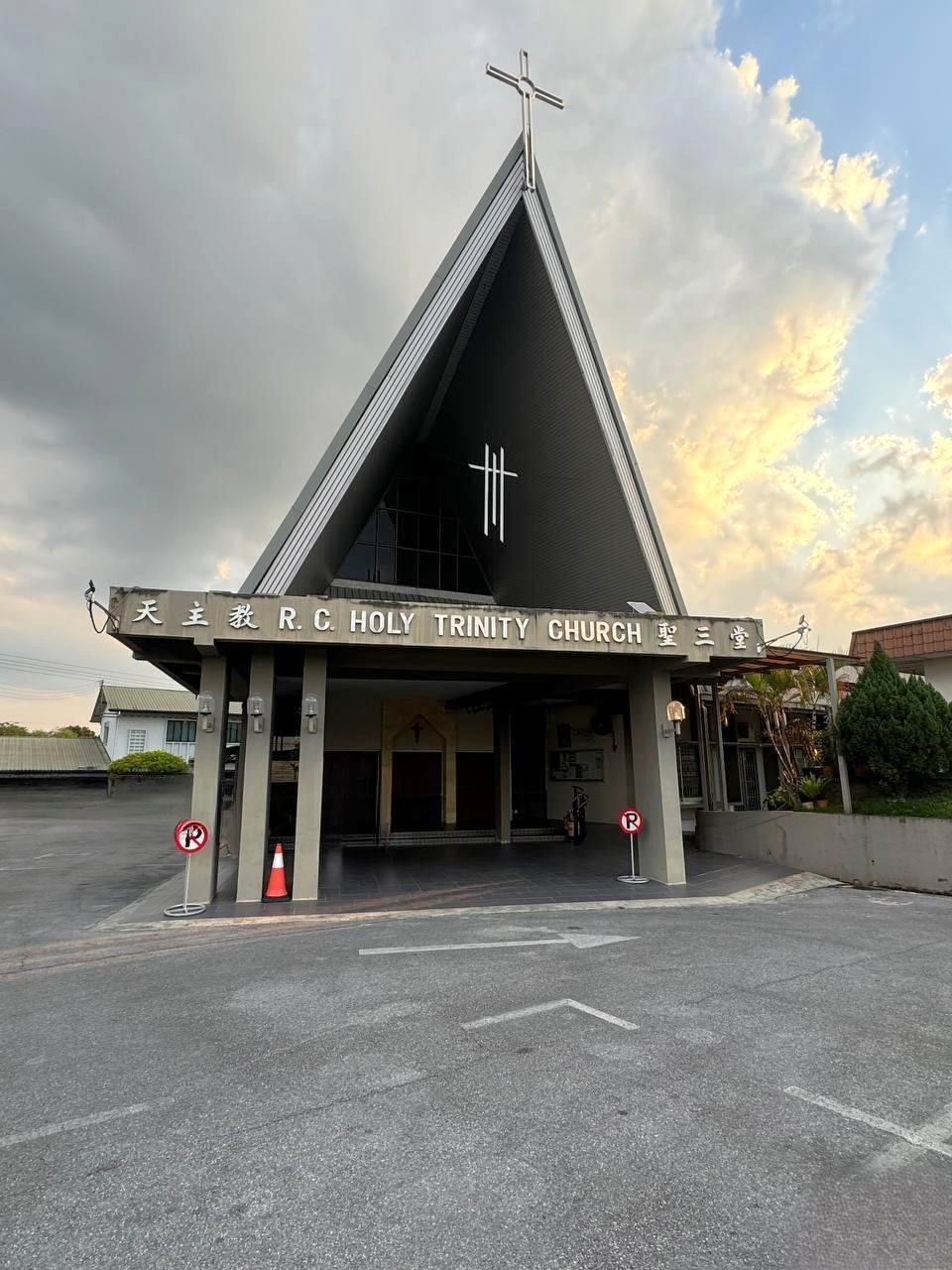
Holy Trinity church in Kenyalang Park, Kuching.

- Holy Trinity Church, Kenyalang Park, Kuching
- Our Lady Queen of Peace Church, Sri Aman
  - sub-parishes of Mount Hosanna Chapel, Selepong/Gua, Sri Aman
  - Holy Family Church, Betong
  - St. Anthony Church, Skrang, Betong
  - St. Patrick Church, Rantau Beruru, Nanga Kara, Betong
  - St. Ignatius Church, Saratok
  - St. Matthew the Apostle Church, Meruji, Sg. Awik, Saratok
  - St. Peter Church, Jaong, Ulu Roban, Saratok
  - St. Jerome of Bethlehem Church, Krangan Rusa, Saratok and
  - St. Michael the Archangel Church, Kaong Ulu, Lubok Antu

== Religious communities ==
=== Men ===
- (China) Congregation of the Disciples of the Lord (CDD)
- (Italy) Congregation of Missionary Sons of the Immaculate Heart of the Blessed Virgin Mary / Claretians (CMF)
- (Italy) Order of the Discalced Brothers of the Blessed Virgin Mary of Mount Carmel / Discalced Carmelites (OCD)
- (Italy) Marist Brothers (FMS)
- (United Kingdom) Saint Joseph's Missionary of Mill Hill / Mill Hill Missionaries (MHM)
- (Italy) Order of Friars Minor / Franciscans (OFM)
- (Italy) Society of Saint Francis de Sales / Salesians of Don Bosco (SDB)
- (Italy) Society of Jesus / Jesuits (SJ)

=== Women ===
- (Italy) Discalced Carmelites (OCD) (Women's section)
- (Malaysia) Sisters of St. Francis of Sarawak (SSFS)

== Missionary schools ==
=== Primary ===
- St. Joseph's Private Primary School, Kuching
- SK St Teresa, Kuching
- SK Sacred Heart, Semeba, Batu Kitang, Kuching
- SK St Andrew, Sg Apong, Pending, Kuching
- SK St Stephen, Bau
- SK St Jude, Bunan Gega, Serian
- SK St Philip, Bugu, Serian
- SK St Dominic, Pichin, Serian
- SK St Henry, Slabi, Serian
- SK St Patrick, Tangga, Serian
- SK St John, Mantung, Serian
- SK St Michael, Mongkos, Serian
- SK St Norbert, Paon Gahat, Serian
- SK St Anthony, Kawan, Serian
- SK St Alban, Ampungan, Serian
- SK St Raymond, Mujat, Serian
- SK St Peter, Simpok, Kota Padawan
- SK St Elizabeth, Tijirak, Siburan
- SK St Francis Xavier, Seratau, Siburan
- SK St Teresa, Stenggang, Bau
- SK St John, Singai, Bau
- SK St Patrick, Krokong, Bau

=== Secondary ===
- SMK St Joseph, Kuching
- St Joseph Private Secondary School, Kuching
- SMK St Teresa, Kuching

== See also ==
- List of Catholic dioceses in Malaysia
- Catholic Church in Malaysia

== Sources and external links ==
- GCatholic.org, with Google map and satellite photo - data for all sections
- Official website
- Catholic-Hierarchy
