= Canapium =

Roman–Berber town in Africa Proconsolare

Canapium was a Roman–Berber town in the province of Africa Proconsolare. Its stone ruins are located near Henchir-El-Casbath, in the region of Mornag, Tunisia.

The city was also the seat of an ancient Latin Catholic bishopric under the leadership of the Bishop of Carthage. The Bishopric was founded during the Roman Empire and survived through the arian Vandal and Orthodox Byzantine empires, only ceasing to function with the Muslim conquest of the Maghreb.

The diocese survives today as a titular see of the Roman Catholic Church, and the current bishop is José Luiz Gomes de Vasconcelos.
