= St. Joseph's Cathedral, Kuching =

St. Joseph's Cathedral
- Cathedral Parish of St. Joseph, Kuching
- Malay: Katedral St. Joseph
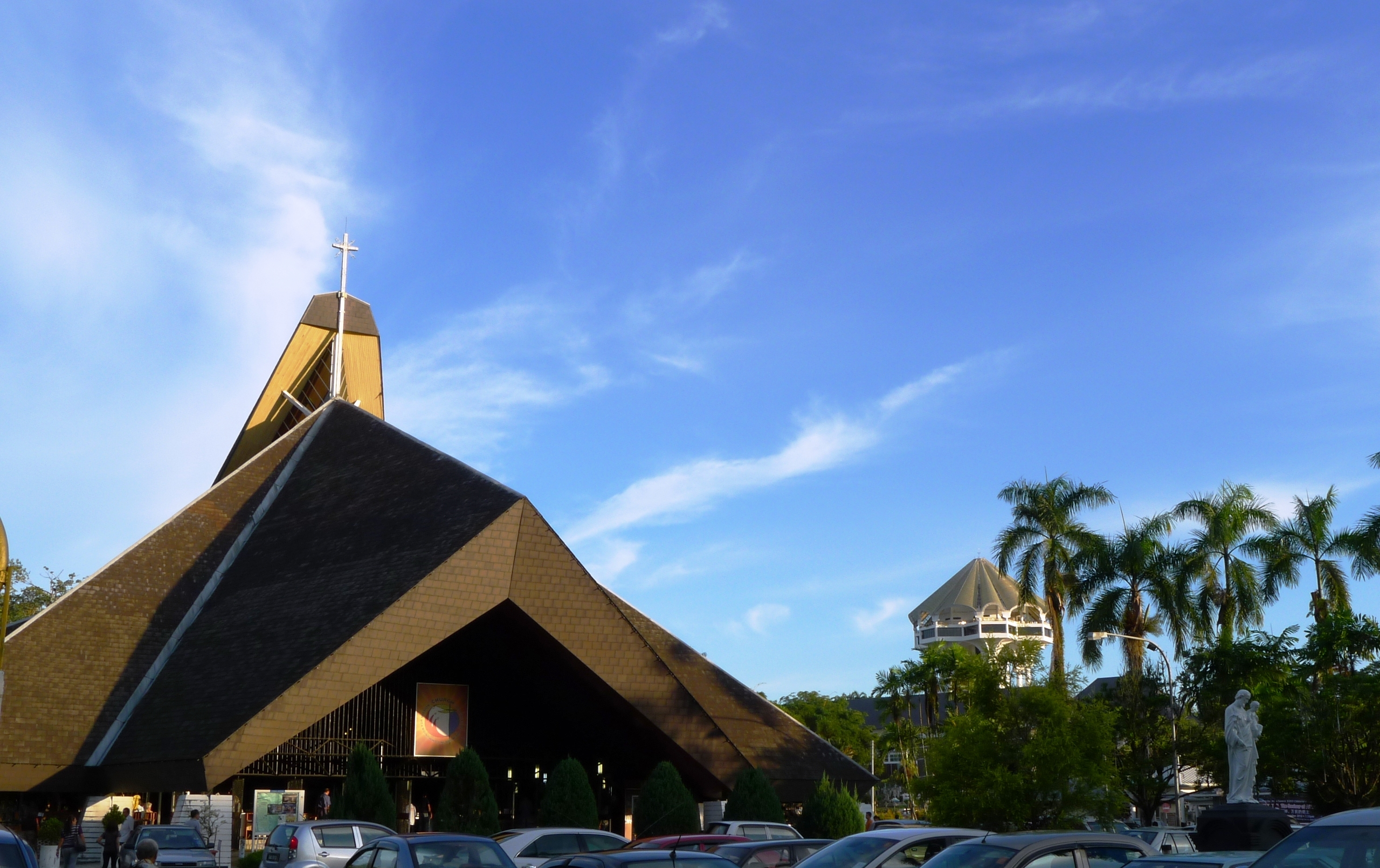
- St. Joseph's Cathedral
- 1°33′03″N 110°20′32″E
- Location: Kuching
- Country: Malaysia
- Denomination: Roman Catholic Church
- Website: www.stjosephkuching.org

History
- Founded: 1976

Architecture
- Completed: 1891 (old cathedral); 1976 (new cathedral)

Administration
- Province: Kuching
- Archdiocese: Kuching

Clergy
- Archbishop: Simon Peter Poh Hoon Seng
- Vicar: William Sabang

The St. Joseph's Cathedral also called Cathedral of Kuching is a religious building that is affiliated with the Catholic Church and is located in the city of Kuching, a Malaysian city situated in the island of Borneo and the state capital of Sarawak.

The building follows the Roman or Latin rite and is the main mother church or the Metropolitan Archdiocese of Kuching (Archidioecesis Kuchingensis; Keuskupan Agung Kuching) which gained its current status by bull "Quoniam Favente Deo" of Pope Paul VI.

It is under the pastoral responsibility of Archbishop Simon Poh Hoon Seng since 4 March 2017.

== See also ==
- Roman Catholicism in Malaysia
- Roman Catholic Archdiocese of Kuching
- St. Joseph's Cathedral (disambiguation)
