= List of schools in Thailand =

Schools in Thailand provide basic education, which covers pre-primary, primary and secondary education. Though most schools provide formal education following the National Curriculum, certain specialised schools may provide non-formal education. Most state schools operate under the auspices of the Office of the Basic Education Commission (OBEC), local governments, or universities, while private schools operate under the oversight of the Office of the Private Education Commission.

There are 37,175 schools in Thailand providing general education as of the 2011 academic year. These include 31,286 schools under the OBEC, 1,726 operated by local governments, 57 university demonstration schools, 414 Phrapariyatidhamma (Buddhist) schools and 3,679 private schools. (Note: Others include eleven sports schools, one autonomous private organisation and one under the Ministry of Defence.) This list covers notable schools providing general education in the K1-K3 (Anuban), primary P1-P6 (Pratom) and secondary M1-M6 (Mathayom) levels, listed by province. A list of private and public Montessori Schools can be found on Montessori in Thailand.

== Amnat Charoen Province ==
- Amnatcharoen School, Amnat Charoen

== Buriram Province ==
- Buriram Pittayakhom School, Buriram
- Lamplaimat Pattana School, Buriram
- Princess Chulabhorn Science High School Buriram

== Chaiyaphum Province ==
- Chaiyabhumbhakdeechumphon School, Muangchaiyaphum

== Chachoengsao Province ==
- Benchamaratrungsarit 2 School, Chachoengsao
- Dat Daruni School, Chachoengsao
- Saint Louis School, Chachoengsao

== Chanthaburi Province ==
- La Salle School, Chanthaburi

== Chiang Mai Province ==
- Fangchanupathum School, Ban Song Kwae
- Panyaden International School, Hang Dong
- Prem Tinsulanonda International School, Mae Rim

=== Chiang Mai ===
- American Pacific International School
- Chiang Mai International School
- Christian German School
- Dara Academy
- Grace International School
- Lanna International School
- Montfort College
- Nakornpayap International School
- Prince Royal's College
- Yupparaj Wittayalai School

== Chiang Rai Province ==
- Chiang Rai Witthayakhom School, Chiang Rai
- Doilan Pittaya School
- Princess Chulabhorn Science High School Chiang Rai
- Samakkhi Witthayakhom School, Mueang Chiang Rai

== Chonburi Province ==
- Assumption College Sriracha, Si Racha
- Chonkanyanukoon School, Chonburi
- ISE International School, Bowin
- Princess Chulabhorn Science High School Chonburi
- Singsamut School, Sattahip
- Thai-Japanese Association School Sriracha, Si Racha

== Kamphaeng Phet Province ==
- Princess Chulabhorn Science High School Kamphaeng Phet

== Kanchanaburi Province ==
- Visuttharangsi School, Tha Muang

== Khon Kaen Province ==
- Banphai School, Ban Phai
- Phuwiang Wittayakhom School, Phu Wiang
- Khon Kaen Wittayayon School, Khon Kaen

== Kalasin Province ==
- Princess Chulabhorn Science High School Kalasin

== Lampang Province ==
- Bunyawat Witthayalai School, Lampang
- Princess Chulabhorn Science High School Lampang

== Lamphun Province ==
- Chakkam Khanathon School, Lamphun
- Rapeeleart Wittaya School

== Loei Province ==
- Loeipittayakom School, Mueang Loei
- Princess Chulabhorn Science High School Loei

== Lopburi Province ==
- Princess Chulabhorn Science High School Lopburi

== Maha Sarakham Province ==
- Sarakhampittayakhom School, Maha Sarakham

== Mukdahan Province ==
- Princess Chulabhorn Science High School Mukdahan

== Nakhon Nayok Province ==
- Armed Forces Academies Preparatory School

== Nakhon Pathom Province ==
- Joseph Upatham School, Sam Phran
- Mahidol University International Demonstration School, Salaya
- Mahidol Wittayanusorn School, Phutthamonthon
- Phrapathom Wittayalai School

== Nakhon Sawan Province ==
- Nakhon Sawan School, Nakhon Sawan

== Nakhon Si Thammarat Province ==
- Kanlayanee Si Thammarat School, Nakhon Si Thammarat
- Princess Chulabhorn Science High School Nakhon Si Thammarat
- Srithammarat Suksa School, Nakhon Si Thammarat

== Nakhon Ratchasima Province ==
- Suranaree School, Nakhon Ratchasima
- St. Stephen's International School, Khao Yai

== Nong Bua Lamphu Province ==
- Nawangsuksawit School, Na Wang
- Nongbuapittayakarn School
- Sriboonruang Wittayakarn School, Si Bun Rueang

== Nonthaburi Province ==
- Ampornpaisarn School, Pak Kret
- International School Bangkok
- St. Andrews Samakee International School
- Suankularb Wittayalai Nonthaburi School, Pak Kret

== Pathum Thani Province ==
- Princess Chulabhorn Science High School Pathum Thani

== Phang Nga Province ==
- Hanseatic School for Life, Khao Lak

== Phetchaburi Province ==
- Benchamatheputhit School, Phetchaburi
- Princess Chulabhorn Science High School Phetchaburi
- Prommanusorn Phetchaburi School, Moung

== Phitsanulok Province ==
- Chalermkwansatree School, Phitsanulok
- Padoongrasdra School, Phitsanulok
- Princess Chulabhorn Science High School Phitsanulok

== Phra Nakhon Si Ayutthaya Province ==
- Ayutthaya Wittayalai School, Phra Nakhon Si Ayutthaya
- Chomsurang Upatham School, Phra Nakhon Si Ayutthaya
- Laboratory School of Phranakhon Si Ayutthaya Rajabhat University

== Phuket Province ==
=== licensed as a Learning Center ===
- Balanced Naturally S.O.U.L - Montessori - Rawai
- Good Shepherd School Phuket Town, Talard Yai
- Saint Euphrasia BanYa Literacy and Learning Center, Thalang
- Yes School Phuket, Rawai, Naiharn

=== 0-6 years licensed as Nursery, Kindergarten 0-K3 ===
- Greenhouse Phuket Kindergarten - Montessori - Cherngtaley
- Indigo Kids International Preschool, Cherngtaley
- Rainbow Montessori International School - Montessori - Vichit

=== 12-18 years licensed as Secondary School M1-M6 ===
- Phuket Wittayalai School
- Satree Phuket School

=== 3-18 years licensed up to Secondary School K1-M6 ===
- British International School, Phuket
- Muang Phuket Minicipal School
- Muangthalang School, Thalang
- Galileo Maritime Academy
- QSI International School of Phuket
- United World College Thailand

== Ratchaburi Province ==
- Anuban Ratchaburi School, Mueang
- Photha Wattana Senee School, Photharam

== Rayong Province ==
- Banchangkarnchanakul Wittaya School, Ban Chang
- Kamnoetvidya Science Academy, Wang Chan
- Rayong English Programme School, Ban Chang
- Rayongwittayakom School, Rayong

== Sakaeo Province ==
- Princess Chulabhorn Science High School Sakaeo

== Samut Prakan Province ==
- American School of Bangkok
- Assumption College Samutprakarn, Mueang Samut Prakan
- Concordian International School
- Nawaminthrachinuthit Triam Udomsuksa Pattanakarn School, Bang Bo
- Ratwinit Bangkaeo School, Bang Phli
- Sriwittayapaknam School, Samut Prakan
- Samutprakan School, Samut Prakan
- Streesmutprakan School, Samut Prakan
- Thai-Chinese International School
- Thai Sikh International School

== Samut Sakhon Province ==
- Samutsakhonburana School, Mahachai

== Saraburi Province ==
- Adventist International Mission School, Muak Lek

== Satun Province ==
- Princess Chulabhorn Science High School Satun

== Songkhla Province ==
- Hatyaiwittayalai School, Hat Yai
- Mahavajiravudh Songkhla School, Songkhla

== Suphan Buri Province ==
- Princess Chulabhorn Science High School Suphan Buri

== Surat Thani Province ==
- Suratthani School
- The International School of Samui, Koh Samui

== Tak Province ==
- Sapphawitthayakhom School, Mae Sot

== Trang Province ==
- Princess Chulabhorn Science High School Trang

== Ubon Ratchathani Province ==
- Princess Chulabhorn Science High School Ubon Ratchathani

== Udon Thani Province ==
- Udonpittayanukoon School, Mueang Udon Thani

== Uttaradit Province ==
- Fak Tha Wittaya School, Fak Tha
- Uttaradit School, Uttaradit

== See also ==
- Education in Thailand
- List of demonstration schools in Thailand
- List of international schools in Thailand
- List of libraries in Thailand
- List of universities and colleges in Thailand
