= Nawangsuksawit School =

Nawang Suksawit School
- โรงเรียนนาวังศึกษาวิช

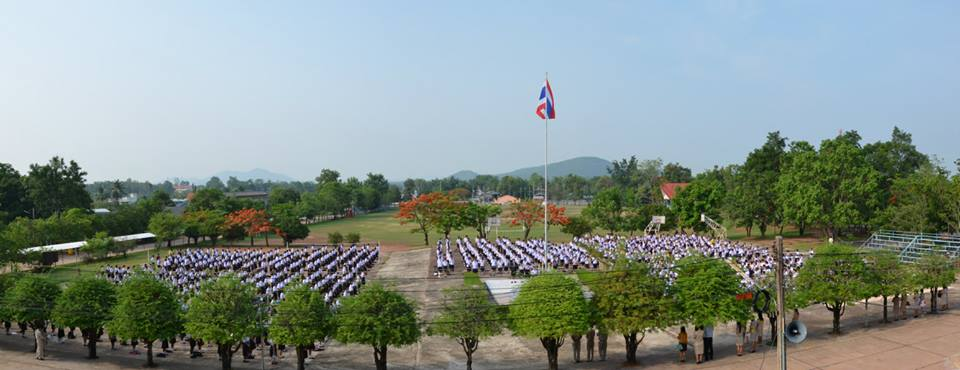

Location
- Na Wang District, Nongbua Lamphu Province; Kingdom of Thailand
- 17°19′40.8″N 102°03′59.0″E

Information
- Type: Public school
- Motto: Wisdom is the light in the World
- Established: 30 March 1978
- Founder: Department of General Education
- Locale: 55 Udon-Loei Road, Nalao, Na Wang District, Nongbua Lamphu Province, Thailand 39170
- Director: Mr. Chamnian Matkit
- abbreviation: NW, น.ศ
- Teaching staff: 91 (2019 academic year)
- Grades: 7–12
- Gender: Coeducational
- Enrollment: 1,314 (2019 academic year)
  - Grade 7: 221
  - Grade 8: 232
  - Grade 9: 277
  - Grade 10: 211
  - Grade 11: 197
  - Grade 12: 176
- Language: (Thailand) Thai Language (Japan) Japanese Language (United Kingdom) English Language (China) Chinese Language (Vietnam) Vietnamese Language
- Color: Blue-Red
- Song: Nawang Suksawit School March (มาร์ชโรงเรียนนาวังศึกษาวิช)
- Mascot: Lagerstroemia speciosa
- O-NET average: 144.68/500 or 28.99% (2018 academic year)
- Website: http://www.nawang.ac.th

Nawang Suksawit School (also known as Nawang Education School) (commonly called: Nawangwit)(Thai: โรงเรียนนาวังศึกษาวิช; RTGS: Rongrian Nawang Sueksawit) is a large secondary school in the Nong Bua Lamphu Province of Thailand. It is in the Wang Saen Suwan campus. Under the Office of the Secondary Educational Service Area Office 19.

== History ==
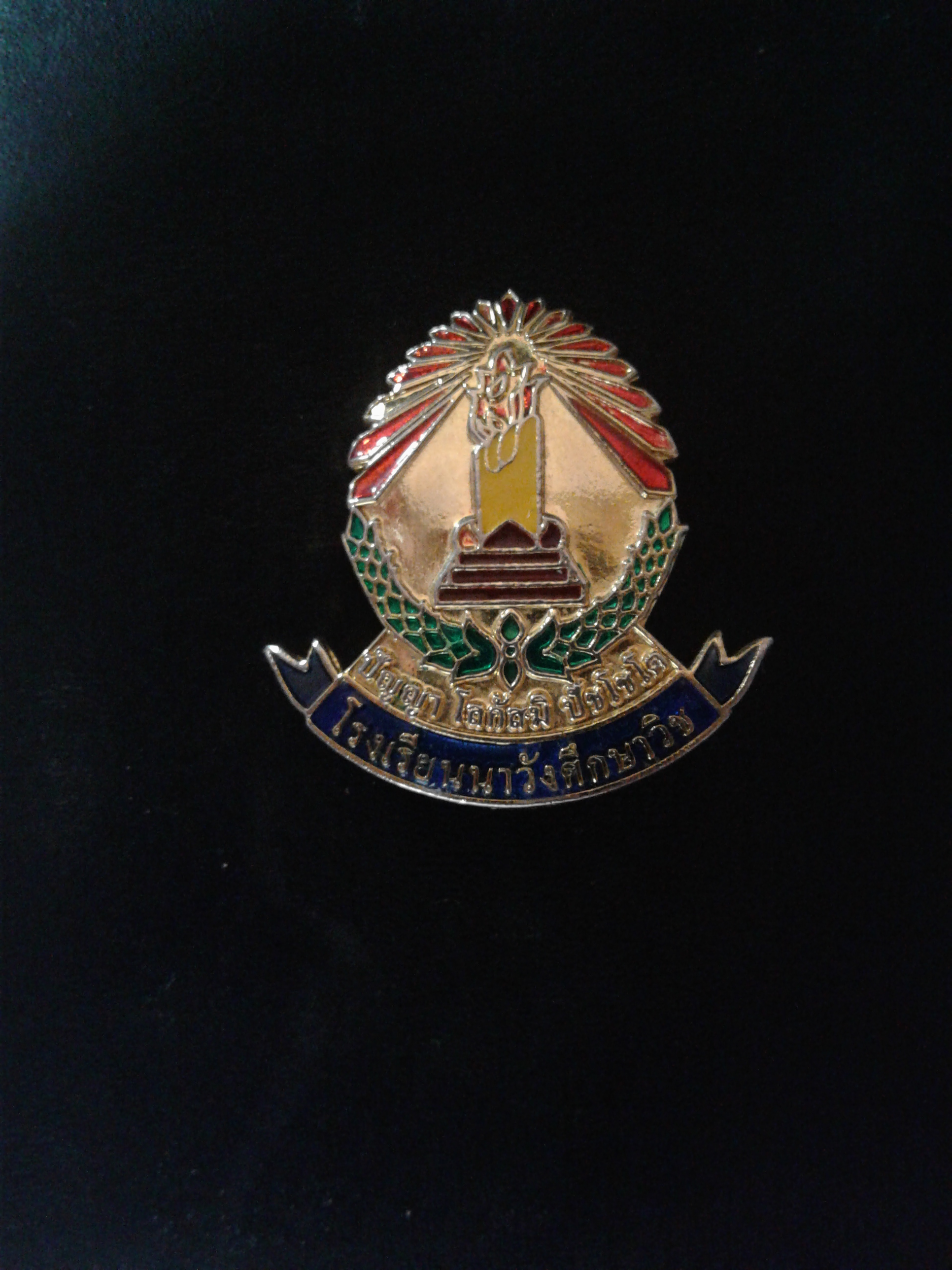
School symbol

Nawang Suksawit School is a high school of Na Wang District, Nong Bua Lamphu was formerly known as Naklang Suksawit School, Naklang District, Udonthani Province. Established on March 30, 1978. First opened in May 1978. There are 120 students, 4 teachers have been allocated. Mr. Peerapol Srilao is the principal teacher. The area is generally sloping from the west to the east. The area is mostly clay, clay, clay. It is a cultivation problem. Area Reclamation And the water is very strong. The first term in Udon Thani. The school is located in Tambon Na lao, Naklang District, Udon Thani Province. First, use a delicious home is a place to teach. The first school building is The Inthanin Building was completed in 1980, followed by Ratchaphruek Building. Until the academic year 2535 approved by the Ministry of Education to teach in the secondary school. Then in 1993, on the west side of Udon Thani, which is adjacent to Loei Province. Nongbua Lamphu District, Suwannakhuha District Sriboonrueng District And noonsang district. It was declared as Nong Bua Lam Phu Province on December 1, 1993, published in the Government Gazette Vol. 110, Part 125, dated September 2, 1993. Nawang Suksawit School is located in the district. Nongbua Lamphu province Until April 30, 2537, the Ministry of Interior announced the five districts of the district of Naklang district, namely, Thep Kiri, Nalao, Nakae, Wang Thong and Wang Plapom. Raised as a semi-district Na Wang. The school was renamed after the name of the district in those days. Nawang Suksawit School Due to the increasing number of students from high school students Secondary school is Na Wang district. Therefore, it was approved to build a new school building, Leelawadee Building, in the year 2538 to support the expansion of the school will occur in the future. Then in 2003, the school was selected by the Ministry of Education as a school in one district one school in dream of Na Wang District, Nongbua Lamphu province. This is a remarkable project of educational reform of the government in those days.

With the potential and quality of the various schools of Na Wang Education, the school has become an important source of learning in Na Wang district. And received many awards at the provincial level. Northeast and national level

With the cooperation of teachers and students, the school has become more popular in Nong Bua Lamphu. Nawang Suksawit School is also selected. School of Development Leadership in ASEAN Community of Nong Bua Lamphu Province. The development of education in any district. The school past Nawang Suksawit School. It can not be done alone. It is important to rely on and get support from all sectors to be successful, such as the Alumni Association Nawang Suksawit School, Tonkla Nawangwit club, Na Wang Hospital, a teacher and students in Na Wang District.

At Present, Nawang Suksawit School is located at 55 Moo 13, Udon Than - Loei Road, Tambon Nalao, Nawang District, Nong Bua Lamphu Province. There are 3 school buildings, 4 operating buildings, 1 temporary building and one main hall. The school has a total area of over 14 rais. The school director is Mr. Pisit Shinchaipong. School distance from the school to the provincial center 42 km.

== Course ==
Nawang Suksawit School has developed a curriculum based on the Basic Education Curriculum BE 2551, a core curriculum for both compulsory and core curriculum. Also included is the school's curriculum management. Military students From 1st to 3rd year

=== Junior high school level ===
Junior high school level (Grade 7–9)
Special Study plan	Special	2 rooms		Students
Mathematics by Computer system Special classroom	MCS	2 rooms	Special program for school	60
General Study Plans	General	7 rooms		Students
General Study Plans	GS			
General Study Plans	GS	7 rooms	School program	210
All		9 rooms		270 students

=== High school level ===
High school level (Grade 10–12)
Group Learning	initials	Classrooms	annotation	Students
Science Education	Science Program	4 rooms		120
Science Math Quality Program	Quality	1 room	Special program for school	30
Science Math Program	Science-Math	3 rooms	School program	90
Arts Education	Arts Program	4 rooms		120
Computer	Arts-Com	2 rooms	School program	60
Language	Arts-Lang	1 room	School program	30
Industry	Arts-Ind	1 room	School program	30
All		8 rooms		240 Students

== Director names ==
No.	Name	Duration
1	Mr. Peerapol Srilao	1978 - 1981
2	Mr. Sanuk Sirisatit	1981 - 1982
3	Mr. Saidern Buntra	1982 - 1982
4	Mr. Sombat Moolnoi	1982 - 1982
5	Mr. Wanchai Visetphosri	1982 - 1983
6	Mr. Kittisak Sopha	1983 - 1992
7	Mr. Ngern Chiwpricha	1992 - 2000
8	Mr. Teeraphong Suwanwethin	2000 - 2001
9	Mr. Thawat Moolmuang	2001 - 2010
10	Ms. Wilawan Promso	2010 - 2011
11	Mr. Lek Khaminkhiew	2011 - 2014
12	Dr. Jirawat Jirawatthanaphisit	2014 - 2014
13	Dr. Sukkasem Papinit	2014 - 2018
14	Mr. Pisit Chinchaipong	2018 - 2019
15	Mr. Chaamnian Matkit	2019–Present

== O-NET average ==
This is O-NET average of Nawang Suksawit School in 5 Basic Subject. They are Math, Science, Social study, English and Thai language. This is the national test of grade 12 in secondary level.

Academic Year	2011	2012	2013	2014	2015	2016	2017	2018
Point	157.05	174.15	167.55	174.45	158.10	151.25	143.47	144.68
average	31.41	34.83	33.51	34.89	31.62	30.25	28.69	28.99
Students	200	218	222	250	247	197	167	201

== School premises ==
- Sattaban Hall
- Building 1 Inthanin
- Building 2 Ratchaphruek
- Building 3 Leelavadee
- Kahakam Building
- Autsahakam Building
- Kasettakam Building
- Sillapa Building
- Imaroy Food Building
- Dome 39 years Nawang Suksawit School
- Sillapa Art Garden
- Nangphomhom Garden
- Motorcycle Dome
- Welfare Shop
- Tennis Court
- Football Field
- Activities Floor

== Orthur ==
- Website of Nawangsuksawit School
- Website of The Secondary Education Area office 19
- Facebook Fanpage
