= Nong Bua Lamphu (disambiguation) =

Nong Bua Lamphu may refer to these places in Thailand:

- Nong Bua Lamphu, a town
- Nong Bua Lamphu province
- Mueang Nong Bua Lam Phu district
- 2022 Nong Bua Lamphu massacre
- Nong Bua Lamphu Province Stadium
- Nong Bua Lamphu subdistrict
