= Sriboonruang Wittayakarn School =

- โรงเรียนศรีบุญเรืองวิทยาคาร

Location
- Si Bun Rueang District, Nongbua Lamphu; Kingdom of Thailand
- 16.963272°N 102.278974°E

Information
- Type: Public school
- Motto: Life will flourish with wisdom
- Established: May 23, 1974
- Founder: Department of General Education
- Locale: 13 Bansattisuk, Muang Mai, Si Bun Rueang District, Nongbua Lamphu Province, Thailand 39170
- Director: Mr. Samnao Thaimduangkhae
- abbreviation: SRW, ศ.ร.ว
- Teaching staff: 150 (2024 academic year)
- Grades: 7–12
- Gender: Coeducational
- Enrollment: 3,084(2024 academic year)
  - Grade 7: 568
  - Grade 8: 525
  - Grade 9: 529
  - Grade 10: 503
  - Grade 11: 521
  - Grade 12: 438
- Language: Thai Language; Japanese Language; English Language; Chinese Language
- Color: Blue-White
- Song: Sriboonruang Wittayakarn School March (มาร์ชโรงเรียนศรีบุญเรืองวิทยาคาร)
- O-NET average: 148.45/500 or 29.69% (2016 academic year)
- Website: http://www.srw.ac.th

Sriboonruang Wittayakarn School (commonly called: Siboonrueang; Thai: โรงเรียนศรีบุญเรืองวิทยาคาร; RTGS: Sibunrueang Witthayakhan) is a large high school in Nong Bua Lamphu. The school is in Mu 13, Ban Santisuk, Muang Mai, Sriboonrueng District, Nongbua Lamphu province. It is in the BuaBan campus and under the Office of the Secondary Educational Service Area Office 19.

== History ==
Before 1974, most of the graduates of Sriboonrueng Nongbua Lamphu province had no education opportunities. One of the reasons was that the secondary school was located far away. It was not easy to travel until 2512, when it was planned to establish a secondary school in Si Bun Rueang. However, this project was stopped for a brief period until 1973, when the district brought information to the Ministry of Education. The school was established on May 23, 1973, to be named Sriboonruang Wittayakarn School. The first student was admitted on May 17, 1974. In the first year, two classes were offered and 161 students enrolled. The school began with only 90 students, and the number of classrooms and students increased every year to the present. It is currently the secondary school of Sriboonrueng and is a large international standard school and there are more than 3,000+ students.

== Course ==
=== Junior high school level ===
Junior high school level (Grades 7–9)
Special Program	Special	2 rooms		Students
English integrated study	EIS	2 rooms	Special program of School	70
General	General study plans	10 rooms		Students
Science-math	SM			
Science-math	SM	6 rooms	School Program	210
Language-Technological	Leg-Tech			
Language-Technological	Leg-Tech	2 rooms	School Program	70
Social Education	So-Ed			
Social Education	So-Ed	1 room	School Program	35
Arts Education	Arts-Ed			
Arts Education	Arts-Ed	1 room	School Program	35
All		12 rooms		420

=== High school level ===
High school level (Grade 10–12)
Group Learning	initials	Classrooms	annotation	Students
Science Education	Science-Math	8 rooms		240
Science-Math	EIS	1 room	Special program	30
Science-Math	SMTE	1 room	Special program	30
Science-Math	Sc-Ma	6 rooms	School program	180
Arts Education	Arts	4 rooms		100
Language	Arts-Leg	2 rooms	School Program	50
Sport Education	Arts-Sport	1 room	School Program	25
Technological	Arts-Techno	1 room	School Program	25
All		12 rooms		340

== Director names ==
No.	Name	Duration
1	Mr. Deth Saenbua	1974 - 1975
2	Mr. Rangsadit Srivichai	1975 - 1976
3	Mr. Narong Chatiprot	1976 - 1986
4	Ms. Yupin Suwannee	1986 - 1987
5	Mr. Prajuab Muangjaipet	1987 - 1992
6	Mr. Issara Pansri	1992 - 2003
7	Mr. Prasit Srichiangsa	2003 - 2007
8	Mr. Veera Prompakdi	2007 - 2009
9	Me. Thawat Moolmuang	2009 - 2010
10	Ms. Wilawan Promso	2010 - 2013
11	Mr. Lek Khaminkhiew	2014 - 2018
12	Mr. Jirasak Chaichanashrup	2018 - 2019
13	Mr. Rangsan Suekraksa	2019 - 2020
14	Mr. Natthanchai Biawkep	2020 - 2024
15	Mr. Samnao Thiamduangkhae	2024–Present

== O-NET average ==
This is the O-NET average of the Sriboonruang Wittayakarn School in 5 Basic Subjects. They are Math, Science, Social study, English, and Thai language

Academic Year	2011	2012	2013	2014	2015	2016	2017
Point	128.65	148.50	144.60	150.05	161.80	161.90	148.45
average	25.73	29.70	28.92	30.01	32.36	32.38	29.69
Students	400	450	444	530	473	552	542
