= Samut Prakan (disambiguation) =

Samut Prakan may refer to

- Samut Prakan province
- See Amphoe Mueang Samut Prakan for Mueang Samut Prakan district
- See Samutprakan School for School in Samut Prakan Province
