= Nongbuapittayakarn School =

Nong Bua Pittayakarn School
- โรงเรียนหนองบัวพิทยาคาร
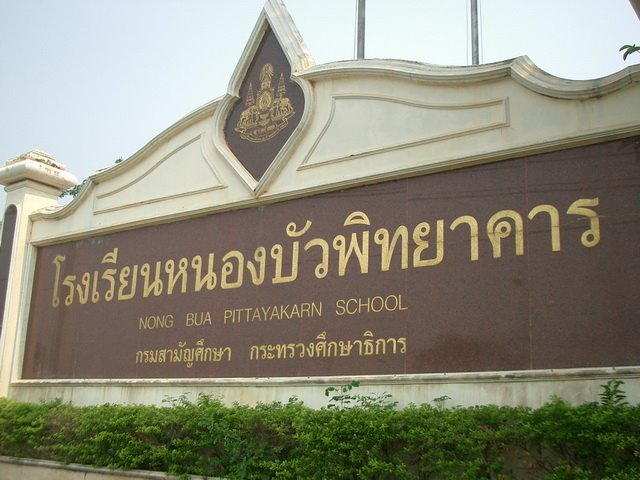

Location
- Nongbua Lamphu Province; Thailand; 17.211277°N 102.447057°E

Information
- Type: Public school
- Motto: Wisdom is the light in the World
- Established: 3 April 1971
- Founder: Department of General Education
- Locale: Udon-Loei Road, Mueang Nong Bua Lam Phu District, Nongbua Lamphu Province, Thailand 39000
- Director: Mr. Lek Khaminkhiew
- abbreviation: NPK, น.พ
- Teaching staff: 218 (2019 academic year)
- Grades: 7–12
- Gender: Coeducational
- Enrollment: 3,437 (2019 academic year)
  - Grade 7: 669
  - Grade 8: 637
  - Grade 9: 605
  - Grade 10: 541
  - Grade 11: 497
  - Grade 12: 488
- Language: Thai; Japanese; English; Chinese
- Color: Blue-Pink
- Song: Nong Bua Pittayakarn School March (มาร์ชโรงเรียนหนองบัวพิทยาคาร)
- Mascot: Lotus
- O-NET average: 163.81/500 or 32.76% (2017 academic year)
- Website: http://www.buapit.ac.th

Nong Bua Pittayakarn School (commonly called: Buapit) (Thai: โรงเรียนหนองบัวพิทยาคาร; RTGS: Rongrian Nong Bua Phitthayakhan) is a Nongbua Lamphu Province Special secondary school in Thailand. Nong Bua Pittayakarn School is located in Udon Thani-Loei Strategic Road, Nong Bua Lamphu Municipality, Mueang District, Nong Bua Lamphu. The Department of General Education in the Ministry of Education is located in the city. It is in the Buaban campus. Under the Office of the Secondary Educational Service Area Office 19.

== History ==
The school's establishment was approved on April 3, 1971. Admission for both male and female students opened in the first year. The Department of General Education governed elementary school systems in those days.

The first permanent building of the school was the central building (Now Building 3) and was built in 1973. The central building hosted eight classrooms encompassing a total area of 34 rais. The school started with three teachers and 90 students. Slowly other buildings were added as the school grew.

In academic year 1975, the Ministry of Education ordered the dissolution and merger of Nong Bua Lamphu School. The boundary of the school is Nong Bua. On May 12, 1975, the school had grown to 19 teachers and 2 janitors.

The school joined the 13th school in 1976 and opened a secondary school. In 1992, it joined the Educational Opportunity Expansion Project.

Before the establishment of Nong Bua Lam Phu Province as a secondary school in Nong Bua Lam Phu. Udon Thani Province, the Nong Bua Lamphu Provincial Act was promulgated on December 1, 1993.

The school later came to educate about 3,200 students.

== Director names ==
No.	Name	Duration
1	Mr. Sali Thornsena	1971 - 1972
2	Mr. Wirapong Chiwakhamnuan	1972 - 1980
3	Mr. Chalard Nited	1980 - 1986
4	Mr. Narong Chapirot	1986 - 1992
5	Mr. Sagob Palinyot	1992 - 1998
6	Mrs. Niworn Suthibun	1998 - 2001
7	Mr. Weera Phormpakdee	2001 - 2007
8	Mr. Prasit Srichiangsa	2007 - 2010
9	Mr. Sanit Wongsaengta	2011 - 2013
10	Ms. Wilawan Phormso	2014 - 2017
10	Mr. Lek Khaminkhiew	2018–Present

== O-NET average ==
This is the O-NET average of Nong Bua Pittayakarn School in 5 basic subjects, including math, science, social studies, English and Thai.

Academic Year	2011	2012	2013	2014	2015	2016	2017
Points	138.85	155.30	153.50	155.85	165.10	166.15	163.81
Average	27.77	31.06	30.70	31.17	33.02	33.23	32.76
Students	450	450	465	518	571	530	486

== Orthur ==
- Website of Nongbuapittayakarn School
- Website of The Secondary Education Area office 19
