= Maha Sarakham (disambiguation) =

Maha Sarakham, or Sarakham for short, may refer to these in Thailand:

- the town Maha Sarakham
- Maha Sarakham Province
- Maha Sarakham district
- Maha Sarakham University
- Mahasarakham University (Rajabhat Maha Sarakham)
- Sarakhampittayakhom School (Sarakham Pittayakhom)
- Mahasarakham SBT F.C., a Thai football club
