= Montessori in Thailand =

School system in Thailand

Montessori education was introduced to Thailand in the early 1990s

== History of Montessori Education in Thailand ==
The history of Montessori education in Thailand begins with the establishment of The Children's Center International (MCCI) in Pattaya Naklua in 1990, initiated by Dr. Wiravan Mootripakdee, also known as Miss Wee. After studying the Montessori approach in the United States, Miss Wee returned to Thailand and opened MCCI, which initially catered to 70 young students between the ages of 2 and 5.

The first Montessori school in Bangkok, the International Montessori Center (IMC), was founded in 1991 by Mrs. Mariam Mahmood.

The Rawai Progressive International Montessori School (RPIS) was established in Phuket in 1996 by Willem van Benthum. The school, under the leadership of the AMI-approved German Montessori Teacher Andreas Becker, expanded from 80 to over 120 students Thai, bilingual, and international students aged 3 to 15 by December 2004 in only 8 months since he had joined the school as Educational Director in May of the same year.

Piti Suksa School, founded in Chiang Mai in 1998, was another important addition to the growing Montessori presence in Thailand. It was established by proactive parents inspired by the Montessori Method, introduced to them by Willem van Benthum.

The influence of Maria Montessori's principles extends even further back, evidenced by the visit of the late King Bhumibol Adulyadej to the École nouvelle de la Suisse romande (ENSR) during World War II. ENSR, a member of the New Education movement, offers a kindergarten embracing the Montessori Method.

A pilot project to integrate the Montessori approach into the Thai public education system began in 2004. Subsequently, the first AMI (Association Montessori Internationale) 3 to 6 Diploma Course was offered in Thailand in 2006.

== See also ==
- Education in Thailand
- International Schools Association of Thailand
- List of international schools
- List of schools in Thailand

== Additional Reference ==
- Transformation in Education: Successes We Can Learn from Montessori, Serene Jiratanan • TEDxPunnawithi, "When education is transformed, humanity will transform,” Serene Jiratanan. Education must enable us to find our purpose. Ideally, we get educated to transform us from the ordinary, unaware state of being, to a transformed and enlightened state of being. ...". Serene Jiratanan is the founder and Principal of Montessori Academy Bangkok International School, the leading trilingual Montessori school in Bangkok
- The Role of Education in the Eastern Economic Corridor by Chantapong, S. (2023). This paper explores the potential role of education in the EEC's development. The author argues that the EEC's success could depend on the ability of Thailand's education system to produce highly skilled workers.
