= Princess Chulabhorn Science High Schools =

- Logo of PCSHS
- Thailand

Information
- School type: Public, Boarding, Secondary Science School
- Motto: Paṇya Yatthaŋ Vippa Shati
- Established: July 27, 1993 (age 33); The first 4 schools were established
- Founder: Princess Chulabhorn
- Authority: Office of the Basic Education Commission
- Oversight: Ministry of Education (Thailand)
- Administrator: Pichet Phophakdee OBEC Secretary-general
- Grades: 7–12 (Mathayom 1–6)
- Gender: Coeducational
  - Grade 7: 96
  - Grade 8: 96
  - Grade 9: 96
  - Grade 10: 144
  - Grade 11: 144
  - Grade 12: 144
- Average class size: 24
- Language: Thai, English
- Classrooms: 30
- Campus type: Rural
- Colours: Blue and Orange
- Slogan: Proud, Honor, Morality, and Bright-minded Academics, while Following The Mission of The Princess
- Song: March of Princess Chulabhorn's College
- O-NET average: 56.30% (Academic year 2017)
- Budget: 946.5746 million Baht (FY 2018)
- School fees: Full scholarship awarded to all students

Princess Chulabhorn Science High School (Thai: โรงเรียนวิทยาศาสตร์จุฬาภรณราชวิทยาลัย; RTGS: Rongrian Witthayasat Chulaphon Ratchawitthayalai), also known as PCSHS, is the name given to a group of science coeducation boarding schools that was established by the Thai Ministry of Education to honor science-oriented Princess Chulabhorn in 1993 when she was 36 years old. PCSHS focuses on developing the talents of students in grades 7-12 (secondary and high school students) in science, mathematics, technology, and environment to support science and technology professionals in Thailand.

== History ==
The first 4 schools were established on July 27, 1993. At that time, the Ministry of Education (MOE) named them "Chaloem Phrakiat Somdet Phrachao Lukthoe Chaofa Chulabhorn Walailak Akkhraratcha Kumari" (Thai: เฉลิมพระเกียรติสมเด็จพระเจ้าลูกเธอเจ้าฟ้าจุฬาภรณวลัยลักษณ์อัครราชกุมารี), followed by name of school located province. In the late 1993, Princess Chulabhorn granted permission to adapt her royal cypher to be the schools' logo and give the new schools' name "Princess Chulabhorn's College" (Thai: จุฬาภรณราชวิทยาลัย; RTGS: Chulaphon Ratchawitthayalai), followed by name of school located province.

On August 6, 2018, MOE announces that Princess Chulabhorn give the royal permission to MOE to change the name of "Princess Chulabhorn's College" to "Princess Chulabhorn Science High School" on July 3, 2018.

On February 2, 2023, MOE established six additional PCSHSs, in accordance with the Cabinet's resolution on October 5, 2021, which approved the expansion of PCSHS to cover all 18 inspection regions defined by Thai Office of the Prime Minister.

== Schools ==
Since 2023, there are 18 schools in the school group;

PCSHSs since 2023 expansion
No.	School	Est. date	Province within service area
1	PCSHS Nakhon Si Thammarat	July 27, 1993 (age 33)	Nakhon Si Thammarat, Chumphon, Phatthalung, Songkhla and Surat Thani
2	PCSHS Chiang Rai	July 27, 1993 (age 33)	Chiang Rai, Nan, Phayao and Phrae
3	PCSHS Trang	July 27, 1993 (age 33)	Trang, Krabi, Phang Nga, Phuket and Ranong
4	PCSHS Buriram	July 27, 1993 (age 33)	Buriram, Chaiyaphum, Nakhon Ratchasima and Surin
5	PCSHS Mukdahan	April 4, 1994 (age 32)	Mukdahan, Nakhon Phanom and Sakon Nakhon
6	PCSHS Satun	May 20, 1994 (age 32)	Satun, Narathiwat, Pattani and Yala
7	PCSHS Phetchaburi	June 2, 1994 (age 32)	Phetchaburi, Prachuap Khiri Khan, Samut Sakhon and Samut Songkhram
8	PCSHS Loei	June 2, 1994 (age 32)	Loei, Bueng Kan, Nong Bua Lamphu, Nong Khai and Udon Thani
9	PCSHS Phitsanulok	February 3, 1995 (age 31)	Phitsanulok, Phetchabun, Sukhothai, Tak and Uttaradit
10	PCSHS Lopburi	February 3, 1995 (age 31)	Lopburi, Ang Thong, Chai Nat, Phra Nakhon Si Ayutthaya, Saraburi and Sing Buri
11	PCSHS Pathumthani	July 31, 1995 (age 31)	Pathum Thani, Bangkok, Nakhon Pathom, Nonthaburi and Samut Prakan
12	PCSHS Chonburi	March 19, 1996 (age 30)	Chonburi, Chachoengsao and Rayong
13	PCSHS Lampang	February 2, 2023 (age 3)	Lampang, Chiang Mai, Lamphun and Mae Hong Son
14	PCSHS Kalasin	February 2, 2023 (age 3)	Kalasin, Khon Kaen, Maha Sarakham, Roi Et
15	PCSHS Suphan Buri	February 2, 2023 (age 3)	Suphan Buri, Kanchanaburi and Ratchaburi
16	PCSHS Ubon Ratchathani	February 2, 2023 (age 3)	Ubon Ratchathani, Amnat Charoen, Sisaket and Yasothon
17	PCSHS Kamphaeng Phet	February 2, 2023 (age 3)	Kamphaeng Phet, Nakhon Sawan, Phichit and Uthai Thani
18	PCSHS Sakaeo	February 2, 2023 (age 3)	Sakaeo, Chanthaburi, Nakhon Nayok, Prachinburi and Trat

Before the expansion in 2023, the PCSHS includes 12 boarding schools around the country. They are:

PCSHSs before 2023 expansion
No.	School	Province within service area
1	PCSHS Nakhon Si Thammarat	Nakhon Si Thammarat, Chumphon, Phatthalung, Songkhla, Surat Thani
2	PCSHS Chiang Rai	Chiang Rai, Chiang Mai, Mae Hong Son, Nan, Phayao, Phrae, Lampang and Lamphun
3	PCSHS Trang	Trang, Krabi, Phang Nga, Phuket and Ranong
4	PCSHS Buriram	Buriram, Chaiyaphum, Maha Sarakham, Nakhon Ratchasima, Sisaket and Surin
5	PCSHS Mukdahan	Mukdahan, Amnat Charoen, Kalasin, Nakhon Phanom, Roi Et, Ubon Ratchathani and Yasothon
6	PCSHS Satun	Satun, Narathiwat, Pattani and Yala
7	PCSHS Phetchaburi	Phetchaburi, Kanchanaburi, Prachuap Khiri Khan, Ratchaburi, Samut Songkhram and Suphan Buri
8	PCSHS Loei	Loei, Bueng Kan, Khon Kaen, Nong Bua Lamphu, Nong Khai, Sakon Nakhon and Udon Thani
9	PCSHS Phitsanulok	Phitsanulok, Kamphaeng Phet, Nakhon Sawan, Phetchabun, Phichit, Sukhothai, Tak and Uttaradit
10	PCSHS Lopburi	Lopburi, Ang Thong, Chai Nat, Phra Nakhon Si Ayutthaya, Saraburi, Sing Buri and Uthai Thani
11	PCSHS Pathumthani	Pathum Thani, Bangkok, Nakhon Pathom, Nonthaburi, Samut Sakhon and Samut Prakan
12	PCSHS Chonburi	Chonburi, Chachoengsao, Chanthaburi, Nakhon Nayok, Prachinburi, Rayong, Sakaeo and Trat

== Curriculum ==
Originally, the curriculum depended on The Ministry of Education but the schools' course of instruction was changed in 2010 by cooperation of Mahidol Wittayanusorn School (Public Organization), a Thailand science high school, and have used this curriculum since then. The PCSHS students receive scholarships from the government for study, food, accommodation, etc.

== Symbols ==
In Thai

Schools' old logo

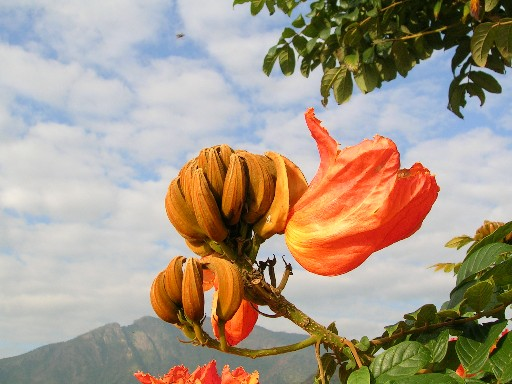
Schools' symbolic tree

The schools' logo is a princess' crown cover letter "จ.ภ." (Jor-Por), the royal initial of Princess Chulabhorn Walailak. The symbolic colors are blue, representing the Thai monarchy, a security-oriented, strict disciplinarian. And red-orange, which represents the traditional Thai color for Thursday, the day that Princess Chulabhorn Walailak was born (July 4, 1957).

The symbolic tree is Spathodea (Thai: แคแสด). This tree has orange-red flowers that represent the symbolic color of the schools.

The school motto is “Moral lead academic matter”. It shows that the PCSHS students have moral principle to bring their knowledge to use.

PCSHS logo has been bestowed by Princess Chulabhorn on 6 December 2019. Designed by Fine Arts Department.

== Notable Alumni ==
- Chuthiwat Jankane — Thai actor, singer, rapper and dancer; member of BUS, a Thai boy band (graduated from PCSHS Phetchaburi)
- Warintorn Panhakarn — Thai actor and model (graduated from PCSHS Lopburi)
- Kroekrit Thaweekarn — Thai footballer (graduated from PCSHS Chonburi)
