= Lamplaimat Pattana School =

- โรงเรียนลำปลายมาศพัฒนา

Location
- Buriram; Thailand; 14.941555°N 102.839336°E

Information
- Type: Private school
- Motto: Education for complete human development
- Established: May 16, 2002
- Headmaster: Mr. Wichian Chaiyabang
- Teaching staff: 35 (2011)
- Enrollment: 250 (2011)
- Website: http://www.lpmp.org/

Lamplaimat Pattana School (LPMP, Thai: โรงเรียนลำปลายมาศพัฒนา) is a private school in Buriram, Thailand. It is a private school, but is owned by a non-profit organization, the Lamplaimat Pattana School Foundation. It does not charge any tuition fee; financial support comes mainly from charitable donations. It was opened in 2003 and has approximately 240 children enrolled at the kindergarten and primary levels. It does not select children based on ability; instead, a lottery is used when necessary.

It is located in a rural part of Buriram province in the North-East of Thailand. Buriram is one of the poorest provinces with educational scores in the bottom 10% of provinces.

== Achievements ==
Despite its policy of not selecting children based on ability, it achieved the best results of all of Buriram's 860 schools in the primary-level nationwide standardized tests in 2010, and was in the top 15% of schools nationwide. In an external quality assessment for 2005–2010 by Office of Nation Education Standards and Quality Assessment, the school was assessed to be at the highest level for 13 out of 14 criteria, and at the second highest level for the one other criteria.

The school was evaluated by an independent team of educational experts from the Faculty of Education at the University of Tasmania in 2006. The review concluded that Lamplaimat Pattana "is an excellent school, which is achieving and exceeding its stated objectives. It compares favourably with international schools and benchmarks of international best practice drawn from the effective schools literature."

== Teaching methods ==
The school's approach to teaching uses ideas from the Teaching for Understanding framework developed by Project Zero at Harvard University's Graduate School of Education. However, it also integrates ideas from other methodologies and includes innovations that were developed at the school.

Subjects are divided into two categories. Thai, Mathematics and English are taught separately, because these involve foundational skills, which must be developed with practice. Other subjects are taught using an integrated project-based approach; each class does one project for an entire quarter. The school avoids the use of standard textbooks; instead teachers prepare learning materials tailored to students' needs. In all subjects, a large proportion of classroom time is spent in collaborative, group activities.

Every day starts with a twenty-minute session that is designed to put students in a peaceful state of mind. The session uses activities that include yoga, meditation, music and story-telling.
