= La Salle Chantaburi (Mandapitak) School =

La Salle Chantaburi (Mandapitak)
- โรงเรียนลาซาลจันทบุรี (มารดาพิทักษ์)

Location
- 58 moo. 1, Chantanimit, Chantaburi, Thailand 22000
- Coordinates: 12.6155478°N 102.127187°E

Information
- Other name: LSCM
- Type: Private school
- Established: 1945
- Teaching staff: 90
- Enrollment: 1,500
- Color: White - Blue
- Website: http://www.lasalle.ac.th/

La Salle Chantaburi (Mandapitak) School (Thai: โรงเรียนลาซาลจันทบุรี(มารดาพิทักษ์)) is a Lasallian Roman Catholic coeducational school. It teaches kindergarten through secondary school. The school is located at 58 moo. 1, Chantanimit, Chantaburi, Thailand. It was opened in 1945. It has about 1500 students and about 90 teachers. White and blue are the school colors. Although it is a catholic school, only about 7-9% of the students are catholic.

== History ==
At first in 1945, the school was named Mandapitak and accepted boys only in Primary Grades 1 to 4. On 17 May, the school was moved to 58 moo. 1, Chantanimit, Chantaburi, Thailand. The first school building has 3 floors, 15 classrooms and is administrated by the De La Salle Brothers. In 1977, they changed the name to La Salle Chantaburi (Mandapitak) School.

Later on, the school began kindergarten classes and built a dormitory for scholarship students who had trouble getting to school. The school set up an alumni club on 19 June 1994, and they also donated money to build school name plaque for their school. Afterwards, the school expanded to teach grades 10 to 12, constructed the De La Salle Brother's home, and built a new basketball stadium with donations from alumni. After that, the school improved the toilets, canteen, school building, park, added computer subjects, and constructed a new kindergarten building.
