= Loeipittayakom School =

Loei Pittayakom School
- โรงเรียนเลยพิทยาคม

Location
- Mueang Loei District, Loei; Kingdom of Thailand
- Coordinates: 17.490697°N 101.716007°E

Information
- Type: Public school
- Motto: Unity of the Blessed Group
- Established: 24 March 1972
- Founder: Dr. Koh Sawadphanit
- Locale: 237/9 Dansai-Loei Road, Kudpong, Mueang Loei District, Loei Province, Thailand 42000
- Director: Mr. Thawat Moolmuang
- abbreviation: LPK, ล.พ.ค
- Teaching staff: 224 (2019 academic year)
- Grades: 7–12
- Gender: Coeducational
- Enrollment: 3,373 (2019 academic year)
  - Grade 7: 552
  - Grade 8: 550
  - Grade 9: 536
  - Grade 10: 594
  - Grade 11: 556
  - Grade 12: 585
- Language: (Thailand) Thai Language (Japan) Japanese Language (United Kingdom) English Language (China) Chinese Language
- Color: Blue-Pink
- Song: Loei Pittayakom School March (มาร์ชโรงเรียนเลยพิทยาคม)
- Mascot: Samanea
- O-NET average: 206.48/500 or 41.30% (2017 academic year)
- Website: http://www.Loeipit.ac.th

Loei Pittayakom School (commonly called Loeipit; Thai: โรงเรียนเลยพิทยาคม; RTGS: Rongrian Loei Pitthayakhom) is a Loei Province Special secondary school in the Province. It is in the Lakmuang campus. Under the Office of the Secondary Educational Service Area Office 19.

== History ==
Loei Pittayakom school that combines Satri Loei schools. (Loei Women's School) with Samosorn Wittayalai School (Loei Men's School) According to the announcement of the Department of Education on March 24, 1972, in order to comply with the policy of the Department of Extraordinary Education. (Department of General Education) to improve public schools nationwide into a large school. By any government school of any province, if considered In the year 1972, the Ministry of Education also included the provincial boarding school and the female provincial boarding school. In the same period, other provinces included the provincial boarding school. Both men and women are in the same school as Saraburi Wittayakom School, Singburi School, Phichit Pittayakom School. The school is located in Tak province. It has to move from the same place with only 23 rai (the school in Loei today) to the school. The area of 81 rai 2 ngan 04 5/10

After the announcement of Mr. Somsin Tanasut, Loei Provincial Education Commissioner, has moved the school during the semester, but Mr. Chalerm Jiranat, head of the college club. He is the head of the school. At the beginning of teaching in 1972, there were 35 classrooms, including 1,468 students, 758 male, 710 female teachers, 61 teachers, and Dr. Sawasdi Panich. The Director General of the Department of Extraordinary Education and Mr. Vijin Suthawatta, Governor of Loei Province The school was opened on June 8, 1972. In 1975, the school taught 2 turns. In 1976, the school joined the program. 2521 transferred 2 high school students from Mueang Loei School and changed the education system from 7: 3: 2 to 6: 3: 3.

== Course ==
Loei Pittayakom School offers the following classes.

=== Junior high school level ===
- Science-Science Program
- Study Plan for Science - English
- Study Plan for English Language Arts
- Gifted Education Program (Gifted)
- English for Academic Purposes (EP-English Program)

=== High school level ===
- Study Plan - Visual Music and Technology
- Study Plan - Calculate (Math and English)
- Science-Math Program
- Science-Math Special Program (SM)
- Special Science Project, Science, Mathematics, Science and Technology (SC)
- Intensive Chinese-English Program (ICE)
- Intensive English Program (IEP)

== O-NET average ==
This is O-NET average of Loei Pittayakom School in 5 Basic Subject. They are Math, Science, Social study, English and Thai language. This is the national test of grade 12 in secondary level.

Academic Year	2011	2012	2013	2014	2015	2016	2017
Point	168.78	187.55	196.75	197.60	207.20	204.36	206.48
average	33.76	37.51	39.35	39.52	41.44	40.87	41.30
Students	450	480	494	517	512	490	476

== Director names ==
No.	Name	Duration
1	Mr. Chalerm Jiranat	1972 - 1973
2	Mr. Truang Yuwakant	1973 - 1977
3	Mr. Wirat Weerasukho	1977 - 1984
4	Mr. Saninpong Nualmanee	1984 - 1986
5	Mr. Sumeth Kapto	1986 - 1992
6	Mr. Prapon Polyeum	1983 - 1992
7	Mr. Kosol Boonchai	1992 - 1998
8	Mr. Kittipit Pisitnaowakul	1998 - 2010
9	Mr. Thawat Moolmuang	2010–Present
