= Saint Louis School, Chachoengsao =

School in Chachoengsao, Thailand

St Louis School, Chachoengsao
- โรงเรียนเซนต์หลุยส์ ฉะเชิงเทรา (Thai)
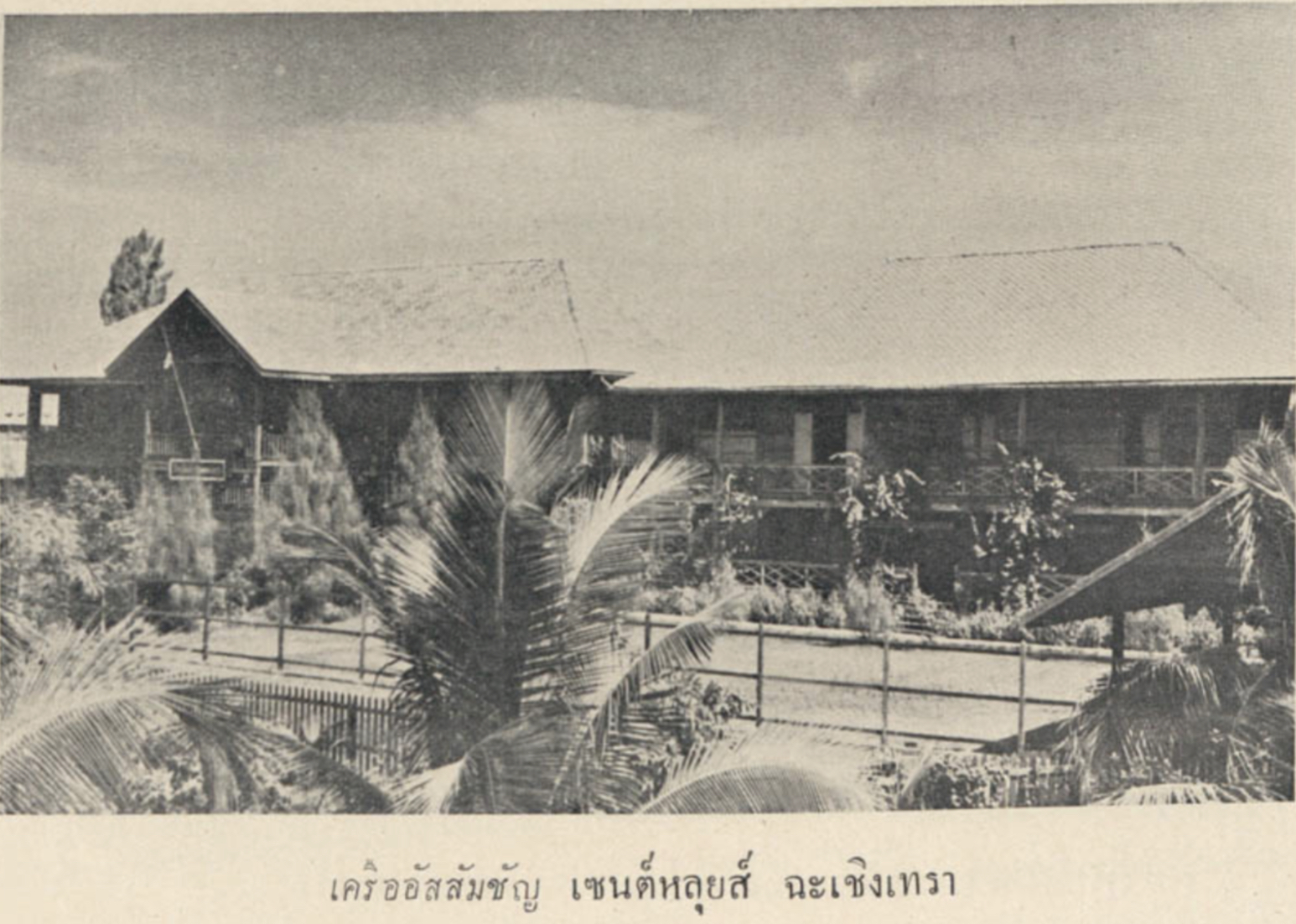
- St Louis School Chachoengsao, circa 1950

Location
- 128 Suppakit St., Na Mueang, Mueang Chachoengsao District, Chachoengsao; Thailand; 13.6923°N 101.0861°E

Information
- Motto: Labor Omnia Vincit (Latin) (Work conquers all)
- Rector: Bro. Kiangsak Mayot, f.s.g.
- Language: The languages taught in this school (Thailand) Thai (United States) (United Kingdom) (South Africa) (New Zealand) (Australia) English (China) Mandarin Chinese
- Website: http://www.sl.ac.th/

Saint Louis School, Chachoengsao (SLC) is a private Catholic school in Chachoengsao, Thailand. The school was established to teach students from the Kindergarten level to Primary level to Secondary Level (Grades 1-12). It is located at 128 Suppakit Street, Na Mueang, Mueang Chachoengsao District.

== History ==
St. Louis School Chachoengsao is part of the St. Gabriel Foundation of Thailand. When the school first opened, it only accepted boys until the year 1979, after which female students were accepted in kindergarten. Since then, St. Louis School continuous to be a coeducational school.

== School's philosophy ==
The aim of life is to know the real truth and access to justice as a noble origin of life. Every man must work, perseverance is the way to success. This philosophy is capsulized in the school's motto, "Labor Omnia Vincit". The English translation is "Work conquers all"
