= Benchamaratrungsarit 2 School =

Location
- Chachoengsao; Thailand
- Coordinates: 13.667002°N 101.100335°E

Information
- Other names: Ben 2; BRR2
- Type: Secondary school
- Motto: สุขา สงฺฆสฺส สามคฺคี (ความพร้อมเพรียงแห่งหมู่คณะ นำมาซึ่งความสุข)
- Established: 1989
- Locale: 111 M.12, Bang Tin Pet, Muang Chachoengsao, Chachoengsao, Thailand 24000
- Director: Mr.Wichai Tammametaporn
- Grades: 7–12
- Enrollment: 2260
- Colors: Yellow and blue
- Website: www.ben2.ac.th

Benchamaratrungsarit 2 School (Thai: โรงเรียนเบญจมราชรังสฤษฎิ์ 2), informally Ben 2, is in the provincial capital of Chachoengsao, Thailand. It is a public secondary school with 1900 students secondary education 1 to 6. The curriculum covers nine subjects: mathematics, science, English, Thai, Chinese, social studies, vocational studies, art and physical education. Students are required to pass examinations in all subjects each year. The school participates in the Lab School Project of Thailand. This is a government initiative designed to improve the standard of schools in Thailand. It emphasis a student-centered learning-by-doing approach to education. The school has an extremely popular English program where students study English, science, mathematics and computer science through English with foreign teachers.

== Chinese language program ==
Ben 2 School has a special program to help students improve their Mandarin Chinese. The Chinese Course is a program designed to enhance Chinese learning overseas in a joint effort between the Thai and Chinese governments to expand the use of Mandarin. The Thai schools that want to join the program are screened for their standard of education and if they qualify, they can apply to the Thai Educational Department for Chinese teachers to teach in their schools. Every year, the Chinese government sends qualified Chinese teachers to Thailand to teach Chinese.

It has been two years since Ben 2 joined the Chinese program. Currently, the course is open to students between grades 8 and 11. Beginning next semester, it will be available to students sitting for the grade 12 national exams. Students can opt to take the Chinese examination during the exam to help them qualify for university courses requiring Mandarin as a language.
