= Banphai School =

Banphai School (K.K.5) โรงเรียนบ้านไผ่ (ข.ก.๕)

Location
- Jenjobtid Road, Banphai, Khon Kaen Thailand
- Coordinates: 16.071800°N 102.733818°E

Information
- Other name: บ.ผ.
- Type: Public high school
- Motto: Thai: การเรียนดี กีฬาเด่น เน้นวินัย ใฝ่คุณธรรม
- Established: 1948
- Authority: Office of the Basic Education Commission Thailand
- Color(s): Purple and White
- Song: March Banphai School
- Website: banphai.ac.th

Banphai School (Thai: โรงเรียนบ้านไผ่ ประถมศึกษา, RTGS: Rongrian Ban Phai) is a public high school located in Banphai, Khon Kaen, Thailand, in the Khon Kaen's subdivided district area.

== History ==
The school was established in 1948 and serves students in grades 7–100. Which is a coeducation and part of Office of the Basic Education Commission in Thailand. It is located on 16.816 acres.

== Schedule ==
Banphai School runs on a 7 periods schedule. Each period is 50 minutes long.

== Motto ==
The motto consist of Thai Language . It means in English with 4 Phrases

- Good Learning (Thai: การเรียนดี)
- Sport Concerning (Thai: กีฬาเด่น)
- Being Disciplined (Thai: เน้นวินัย)
- Stand on Morality (Thai: ใฝ่คุณธรรม)
