= Chomsurang Upatham School =

School in Ayutthaya province, Thailand

Location
- Ayutthaya; Thailand
- Coordinates: 14.364118°N 100.577586°E

Information
- Established: 1919
- Founder: Saovabha Phongsri
- Gender: Girls
- Website: www.chomsurang.ac.th

Chomsurang Upatham School is a high school for girls in Ayutthaya province, Thailand established in 1919 under Royal patronage. It was the first school in Thailand to be established solely for the education of girls.
