= Princess Chulabhorn Science High School Loei =

- โรงเรียนวิทยาศาสตร์จุฬาภรณราชวิทยาลัย เลย

Location
- Chiang Khan District, Loei; Thailand
- 17.726568°N 101.729524°E

Information
- Type: Science High School
- Established: 2 June 1994
- Founder: Princess Chulabhorn
- Locale: 5 Chiang Khan-Loei Road, Tath, Chiang Khan District, Loei Province, Thailand 42110
- Director: Kitichai Kluaithong, As of 2019
- abbreviation: PCSHSLOEI, จ.ภ.ลย
- Teaching staff: 114 (Academic year 2019)
- Grades: 7–12
- Gender: Coeducational
- Enrollment: 720 (Academic year 2019)
  - Grade 7: 97
  - Grade 8: 96
  - Grade 9: 96
  - Grade 10: 144
  - Grade 11: 143
  - Grade 12: 144
- Language: Thai Language; Japanese Language; English Language; Chinese Language
- Campus type: Rural
- Colors: Blue and orange
- Song: Princess Chulabhorn's College March
- O-NET average: 252.95/500 or 50.59% (Academic year 2017)
- Website: www.pcshsloei.ac.th

Princess Chulabhorn Science High School Loei (Thai: โรงเรียนวิทยาศาสตร์จุฬาภรณราชวิทยาลัย เลย; RTGS: Rongrian Witthayasat Chulaphon Ratchawitthayalai Loei : PCSHSLOEI) is a medium-sized secondary school in Loei province, one of Princess Chulabhorn Science High Schools members. In addition, PCSHS Loei is ranked 96th out of 2,800 schools nationwide. Based on the O-NET test results for the year 2016 The past and the 1st in the province.

== Curriculum ==
Originally, PCC's curriculum depended on The Ministry of Education but the schools' course of instruction was changed in 2010 by cooperation of Mahidol Wittayanusorn School (Public Organization), a Thailand science high school, and have used this curriculum since then. The PCC's students receive scholarships from the government for study, food, accommodation, etc.

== Symbols ==
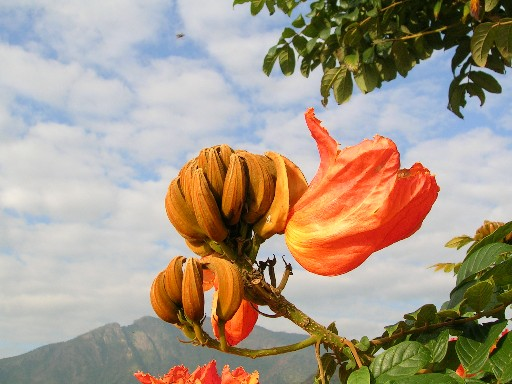
Schools' symbolic tree

The schools' logo is a crown cover letter "จภ." (Jaw-Por). "จภ." is the short version of the name of Princess Chulabhorn Walailak. The symbolic colors are blue, representing the Thai monarchy, a security-oriented, strict disciplinarian. And red-orange, which represents the traditional Thai color for Thursday, the day that Princess Chulabhorn Walailak was born (4 July 1957).

The symbolic tree is Spathodea (Thai: แคแสด). This tree has orange-red flowers that represent the symbolic color of the schools.

The school’s quote is “Moral lead academic matter”. It shows that the PCC’s students have moral principle to bring their knowledge to use.
