= Na Klang district =

Na Klang นากลาง
- District
- District location in Nong Bua Lamphu province
- Coordinates: 17°18′26″N 102°11′19″E
- Country: Thailand
- Province: Nong Bua Lamphu
- Seat: Fang Daeng

Area
  - Total: 570.656 km^{2} (220.332 sq mi)

Population (2005)
  - Total: 90,996
  - Density: 159.4/km^{2} (413/sq mi)
- Time zone: UTC+7 (ICT)
- Postal code: 39170
- Geocode: 3902

Na Klang (Thai: นากลาง, pronounced [nāː klāːŋ]; Northeastern Thai: นากลาง, pronounced [nâː kàːŋ]) is a district (amphoe) of Nong Bua Lamphu province, northeastern Thailand.

== History ==
The district was created as a minor district (king amphoe) on 16 July 1965, when the three tambons Na Klang, Kao Kloi, and Na Si were split from Nong Bua Lamphu District. It was upgraded to a full district in 1969.

On 6 October 2022, a former police officer killed 36 people, including 24 children, and injured 10 others in a combined shooting and stabbing spree before committing suicide. The attack mainly manifested at a children's daycare and this event is currently the deadliest mass murder to have taken place in Thailand's history.

== Geography ==
Neighboring districts are (from the north clockwise): Suwannakhuha of Nong Bua Lamphu Province; Kut Chap of Udon Thani province; Mueang Nong Bua Lamphu, Si Bun Rueang, and Na Wang of Nong Bua Lamphu; and Na Duang of Loei province.

== Administration ==
The district is divided into nine sub-districts (tambons), which are further subdivided into 119 villages (mubans). There are two townships (thesaban tambons) within the district. Na Klang covers parts of tambons Na Klang, Dan Chang, and Kut Hae, and Kut Din Chi covers parts of tambon Kut Din Chi. There are a further eight tambon administrative organizations (TAO).

No.	Name	Thai name	Villages	Pop.
1.	Na Klang	นากลาง	12	12,259
2.	Dan Chang	ด่านช้าง	12	10,334
5.	Kut Din Chi	กุดดินจี่	20	16,336
6.	Fang Daeng	ฝั่งแดง	18	11,856
7.	Kao Kloi	เก่ากลอย	13	8,991
9.	Non Mueang	โนนเมือง	15	10,714
10.	Uthai Sawan	อุทัยสวรรค์	12	6,357
11.	Dong Sawan	ดงสวรรค์	9	6,647
13.	Kut Hae	กุดแห่	8	7,502

Missing numbers are tambons which are now part of the districts Suwannakhuha and Na Wang
