= Suratthani School =

State school in Surat Thani, Thailand

- โรงเรียนสุราษฎร์ธานี

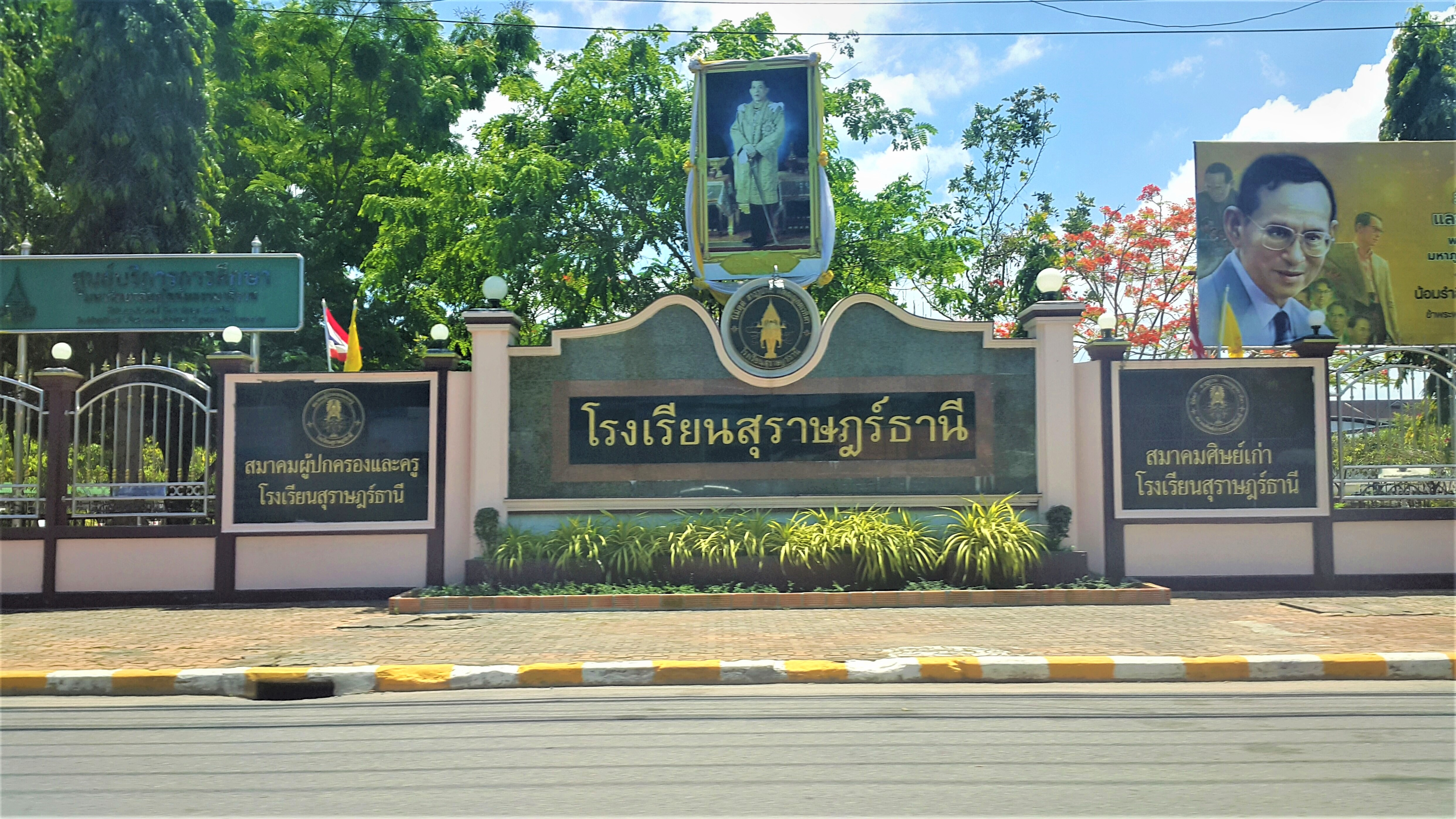
- Suratthani School sign, seen from a nearby road

Location
- Donnok Road, Tambon Talat, Mueang Surat Thani District, Surat Thani Province, 84000
- Coordinates: 9.133592°N 99.329999°E

Information
- Type: State school
- Motto: นิมิตฺตํ สาธุ รูปานํ กตญฺญู กตเวทิตา; Nimittaṃ sādhurūpānaṃ kataññū kataveditā (Appreciation and reciprocation is an emblem of the good)
- Established: 1907
- Status: Open
- Authority: Office of the Basic Education Commission
- Director: Kriangkrai Kaewmisri
- Grades: 7–12 (Matthayom 1–6)
- Gender: Coeducational
- Student Union/Association: Suratthani School Student Council
- Colors: Pink and Green
- Song: Suratthani School Song Suratthani School March
- Website: http://www.st.ac.th/

Suratthani School (Thai: โรงเรียนสุราษฎร์ธานี) is a state secondary school located in Surat Thani, Thailand. It provides education for secondary students from Matthayom 1 to Matthayom 6 (Equivalent to grade 7–12). The school was founded in 1907 at Wat Thammabucha in Surat Thani Province and was relocated many times throughout its history. Nowadays, the school is located on Donnok Road, next to Surat Thani's city hall. It is regarded as one of the best secondary schools in Southern Thailand.

== Notable alumni ==
- Adisorn Threesirikasem: Film Director.
- Apichad Thaveechalermdit: Footballer.
- Banyat Bantadtan: Former Deputy Prime Minister of Thailand.
- Ekaphan Inthasen: Footballer.
- Jarupong Thongsin: Thammasat University student, victim of the 1976 Thammasat Massacre.
- Jirapong Meenapra: Sprinter.
- Pimon Jamjarat: Writer, Translator.
- Prakat Watcharaporn: Former Vice President of the Thai Journalists Association.
- Suporn Atthavong: Politician.
- Siwakorn Lertchukiat: Actor.
- Thanapa Poomdit: Actor.
- Thawat Wichaidit: Former House of Representatives member, Former Provincial Waterworks Authority governor.
- Watchara Petthong: Former Thai House of Representatives member.

== Activities ==
=== Annual sports festival ===
As with many other schools in Thailand, students in Suratthani School participates in a Sports Festival annually. Students are divided into 5 color groups, Red, Yellow, Purple, Blue, and Cyan. Events are usually held at Surat Thani Provincial stadium and within the school itself.
