= Phuket Wittayalai School =

Location
- Phuket; Thailand; 7.892854°N 98.388329°E

Information
- Other name: ภ.ว.; PKW; Phuket Wit School
- Motto: Graduates will practice themselves (Pali: อตฺตานํ ทมยนฺติ ปณฺฑิตา)
- Established: 1897
- School district: Mueang Phuket
- Campus size: 37,400 square meters
- Colors: Blue and white

Phuket Wittayalai School ( P.K.W, Thai: โรงเรียนภูเก็ตวิทยาลัย (ภ.ว.) ) is a coeducational secondary school located in the Phuket municipality in Thailand.

It is regarded as the first school in southwestern Thailand.

There are currently 3417 students in the school making it the largest school in the Phuket Phang Nga Krabi Region.

== History ==
Phuket Wittayalai School was established in 1897 as a Thai language school in the Mongkolnimith temple area. Lord Wisuthiwongsajarn Sangklapamok, the governor of the Phuket province at the time, became the first teacher and head master of the school and developed the academic curricula significantly during his long tenure.

== Junior high school ==
The junior high school, or known as the lower level, provides a general education. It promotes mathematics, science, technology and foreign languages, providing a beginner's English program. At grade 8 and grade 9 it offers a specialist science and mathematics course. There are 5 programs in this level.

Science Mathematics Program Gifted : SMP

This program focuses heavily on Science and Mathematics to the point of expertise, by emphasizing on thinking skills. This program is often known as the King's room (Thai: ห้องคิง) due to how hard and prestigious it is. Rooms in this program ends in /1.

Intensive Science Mathematics and Technology : SMT

This program focuses on Science, Mathematics and Technology skills primary, emphasizing on competencies and scientific process skills. Rooms in this program ends in /2 and /3.

English Program : EP

This program focuses mainly on English proficiency and developing 21st century skills in students. Rooms in this program ends in /4 and /5.

Intensive Chinese and English Program : ICE

This program focuses mainly on language skills, especially in Chinese and English. Rooms in this program ends in /6.

Multiple Intelligence Program: MIP

Based on the Theory of multiple intelligences, this program aims for students to find their own strength in each subjects. This program is also known as the regular program, due to the majority of the school being from this program. Unlike other programs, this program has 40 students per room in contrast to the 30 students per room in other program. This program is also the only program to not have an air conditioner. Rooms in this program ends in /7 to /16.

== Senior high school ==
The senior high school, or known as the upper level, provides more advanced science and mathematics education, including a course in empowering science, mathematics, technology, and the environment which is part of a special national project.

Enrichment Program of Science Mathematics, Technology and Environment : SMTE Promoting Academic Olympiads

This program focuses on Science, Mathematics and Technology skills primary, emphasizing on competencies in preparation for international Olympiad programs. Rooms in this program ends in /1.

Enrichment Program of Science Mathematics, Technology and Environment : SMTE

This program focuses on Science, Mathematics and Technology skills primary, by integrating all subjects to develop desirable qualities in researchers and innovative thinking. Rooms in this program ends in /2 and /3.

English Program : EP

This program focuses mainly on English proficiency, developing 21st century skills in students and foundational knowledge on entrepreneurship in the digital age. Rooms in this program ends in /4.

English Program : EP Science - Mathematics

Also known as EPSM program, this program mainly focuses on enhancing science and mathematical skills and research process through English. Rooms in this program ends in /5.

Intensive Chinese and English Program : ICE

This program focuses mainly on language skills, especially in Chinese and English. Rooms in this program ends in /6.

Gifted Program for International Engineering : GIE

This program is mostly taught in Thai and seeks to create readiness for international engineering, by teaching about Computers, Mathematics, Physics and Chemistry. Unlike other programs, GIE students do not have to learn biology. On Monday till Thursday morning, students will learn at Phuket Wittayalai School. On the afternoon of that Thursday, students will go learn at Phuket Technical College. On Friday, GIE students will go learn at Prince of Songkla University (PSU). GIE students will also have to learn a 3rd language of their liking. During Matthayom 5 on semester 2, students that picked to learn Chinese will go to China, and students that choose Japanese will go to Japan. Matthayom 6 students in Semester 1 will receive special education for TPAT 3. Rooms in this program ends in /7.

Medical and Health Science Gifted Program : MSP

This program aims to develop Medical and Science skills mainly through hands-on experiences at Hospitals and through labs in Biology. This is the newest program to exist in the school. Rooms in this program ends in /8.

Multiple Intelligence Program: MIP

Based on the Theory of multiple intelligences, this program utilizes elective courses on each different professional fields to promote multi-dimensional learning that allows students to create their own learning experiences based on their own interests. This is also known as the regular program, but for the upper level, since most students from this school mainly come from here. Rooms in this program ends in /9 to /17.

== Languages ==
Language courses offered include English, French, Chinese, Japanese and Malay.
