= Muangthalang School =

Location
- (Thailand) 150 Moo 5 Thep Kasattri Rd., Thep Kasattri, Thalang District, Phuket, 83110; Thailand
- Coordinates: 8°04′05″N 98°20′27″E

Information
- Type: Public
- Mottoes: No light is as bright as wisdom.
- Established: 1971
- School board: Secondary Educational Service Area Office 14
- Authority: Office of the Basic Education Commission
- Grades: 7–12 (Mathayom 1–6)
- Gender: Coeducational
- Enrollment: ~ 1800
- Campus type: Suburb
- Colour: Orange - Blue
- Website: http://www.mt.ac.th

Muangthalang School is a public secondary school in Thalang District, Phuket, Thailand. This school belongs to the Secondary Educational Service Area Office 14, Office of the Basic Education Commission (OBEC), Ministry of Education. The school was founded at Thalang, Phuket, Thailand in 1971 as a district school.

Muangthalang School is located in the historical site of Thalang according to the Burmese attacked. Thao Thep Kasattri and Thao Sri Sunthon, The two heroines, best known for their bravery, sacrifice, and patriotism who repelled a five-week invasion by Burmese in 1785, by dressing up as male soldiers and rallying Siamese troops during the reign of King Rama I—the first king of Chakri dynasty.

== Symbols ==
- Name : Muangthalang School, MT(abbr.), Muang(colloquially)
- Motto : No light is as bright as wisdom.
- Seal : Thao Thep Kasattri and Thao Sri Sunthon : Two Heroines of Thalang.
- Colors : Orange-Blue

== Curriculum ==
The school follows the national Curriculum of Basic Education, BE 2544 (2001 CE), providing six years of secondary education, Mathayom 1–6. Many different programs are available for different needs, which aim to develop students' potentialities.

- Programs
1. Science - Math Ability Program (For Grades 7–12: Mathayom 1–6)
2. Science - Math
3. Arts - Math
4. Arts - French
5. Arts - Chinese
6. Arts - Japanese
7. Thai - Sociology
8. Physical Education - English
