= Amnatcharoen School =

Amnatcharoen School (ANC)
- โรงเรียนอำนาจเจริญ
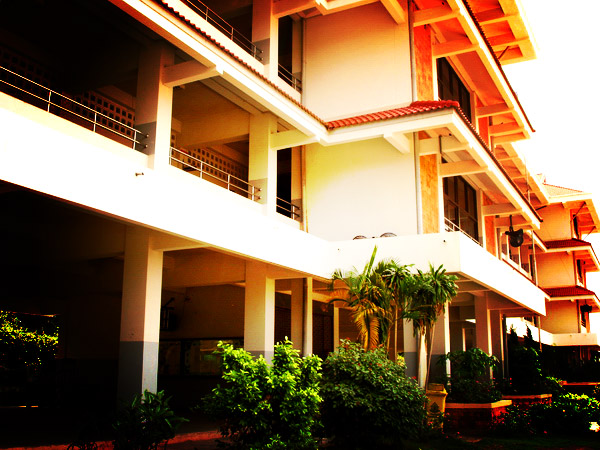

Location
- Amnatcharoen; Thailand
- Coordinates: 15.873017°N 104.624133°E

Information
- Type: State school, National Research School
- Motto: Sikha Chewitta Chotana (in Pali), Education is a Glorious Life. (Do unto others as you would have others do unto you)
- Established: 12 June 1951 1951; 75 years ago
- Principal: Neyom Rakprom
- Staff: 209
- Grades: 7-12 (mathayom 1–6)
- Enrollment: 3,570
- Language: (Thailand) Thai (United Kingdom) English (Japan) Japanese (China) Chinese
- Color
- Website: http://www.anc.ac.th

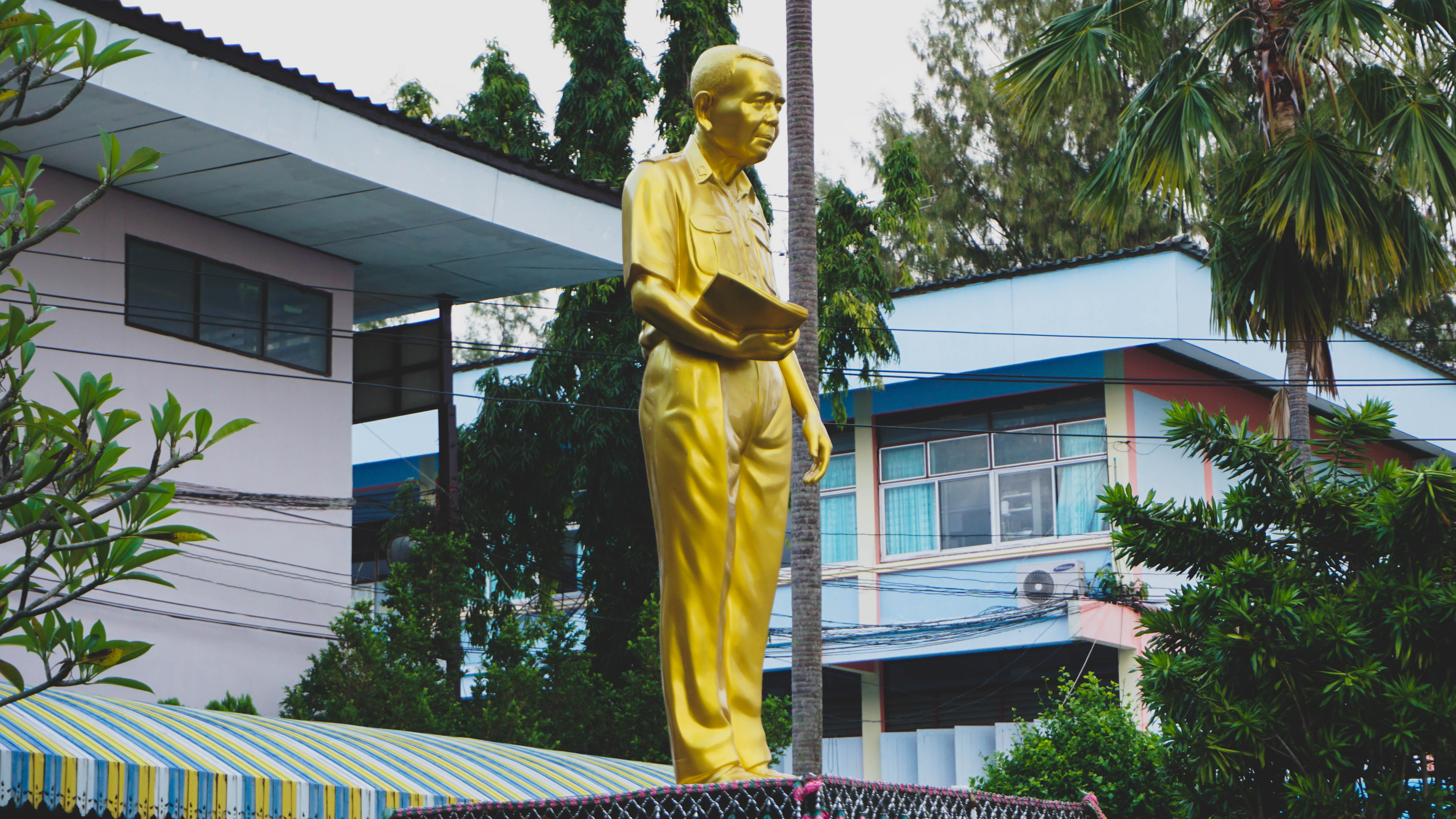
Statue of the first teacher of Amnat Charoen School, Plien Oupariwong

Amnatcharoen School (Thai: โรงเรียนอำนาจเจริญ, pronounced: Am-nat-cha-roen) is a state school with public research school in north east (isan) at Amnatcharoen, Thailand. It was established in 1951 as School of Provincial High School of Amnatcharoen Province Thailand. This is a special large secondary school of the Department of Secondary Education Area Office District 29. It is also one of the World Class Standard Schools (WCSS) in the country.

== History ==
Amnatcharoen School was established on June 12, 1951 according to the province's book 5858/2494 opened teaching at Bungchanwittaya School. Currently it is an Anuban Amnatcharoen School. At that time, there was only one teacher, Plien Oupariwong.

At present, Amnatcharoen School is located at 277, Village No. 13, Chayangkun Road, Bung Sub-district, Mueang District, Amnatcharoen Province which was moved to be established at this place and Amnatcharoenpittayakom School as the first branch of this school.

== Reputation ==
Amnatcharoen School offers law, ICT, foreign language, and arts such as music and dance.

This school is a successful school in the area of the groundwater bank. Several government agencies have visited this school's research works to be applied to organizations and society because this research can effectively tackle drought and flood problems.

== Courses ==
Amnatcharoen School offers courses from grade 7 to grade 12 with the following study plans and courses.

- Normal Program
  - Science and mathematics program
  - Art and foreign language program
  - Foreign language and dance or art program
  - Foreign language with career and technology program
- Special Program
  - Mini English Program (MEP)
  - Advance Program (AP)
  - Pre-Cadet Program (PP)
  - Laws Program (LP)
  - Information and communication technology program (ICTP)

== Extracurricular activities ==
The school also organizes Christmas activities, national children's day activities, sports day activities, freshmen orientation, various camp activities in school, orientation activities, and finishing activities, including various activities on important days in Thailand.

== School colors ==
Amnatcharoen School has established a color faculty to conduct sports activities and to strengthen unity among the group. By using the method of dividing by dividing into rooms in which all students in 7 class will belong to the same color team and will change the color of the team again when entering grade 10.

- Red Team is the science department.
- Yellow Team is the mathematics and art department.
- Green Team is the Thai language, career and technology department.
- Blue Team is the foreign language department.
- Pink Team is the social studies, religion and culture department.

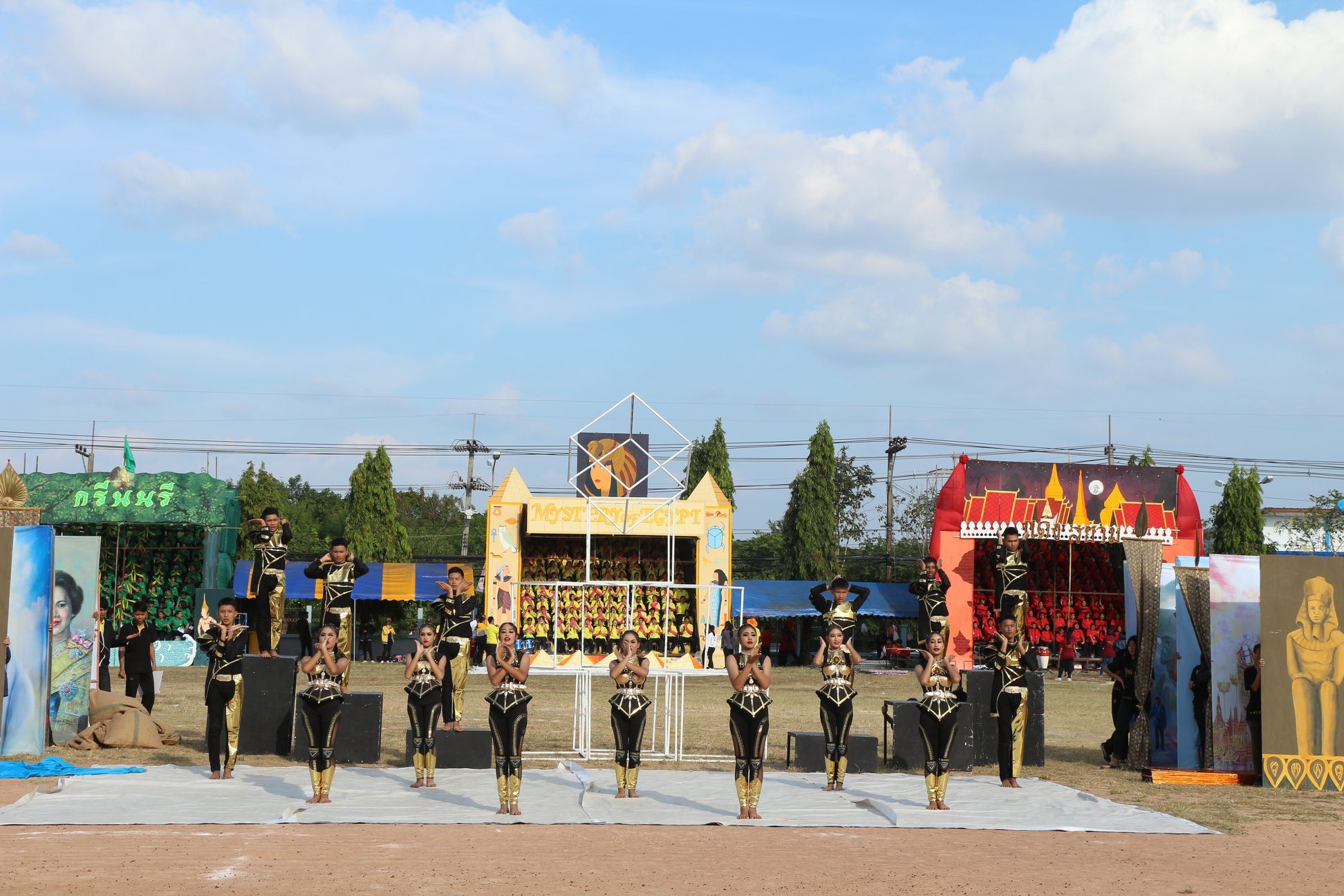
Yellow team on sports day activities

== Personnel ==
Category	Number
Thai teachers	187
Foreign teachers	22
Students	3,570

== Principal ==
Order	Name	Term of office
1	Plien Oupariwong	2494 - 2495
2	Pheiyr Chantabab	2495 - 2497
3	Sucharit Chanthakan	2497 – 2515
4	Charoonsak Jumpawan	2515 – 2521
5	Narong Chiyakarn	2521 – 2524
6	Kasaem Kumtawee	2524 – 2524
7	Sompong Lomarat	2524 – 2525
8	Manu Songsaerm	2525 – 2532
9	Charoen Chongching	2532 – 2535
10	Sompong Lomarat	2535 - 2541
11	Raksa Sripa	2541 – 2543
12	Pongsawat Lapboonrueng	2543 – 2543
13	Chariya Sarakan	2543 - 2547
14	Arune Tanee	2547 - 2548
16	Dr. Jukthip Keela	2548 - 2557
17	Dr. Pitoon Kunkaew	2557 - 2561
18	Acting Lt. Wised Kaew-mesee	2561 - 2563
19	Neyom Rakprome	2563–present

== Logo ==
The ANC logo is the lotus flower with a flame around the torch. In Pali, it means "Sikka Chewitta Chotana", meaning "Education makes life glorious".
