= Dat Daruni School =

School in Chachoengsao, Thailand

Coordinates: 13.689810°N 101.075456°E

- Thai: โรงเรียนดัดดรุณี
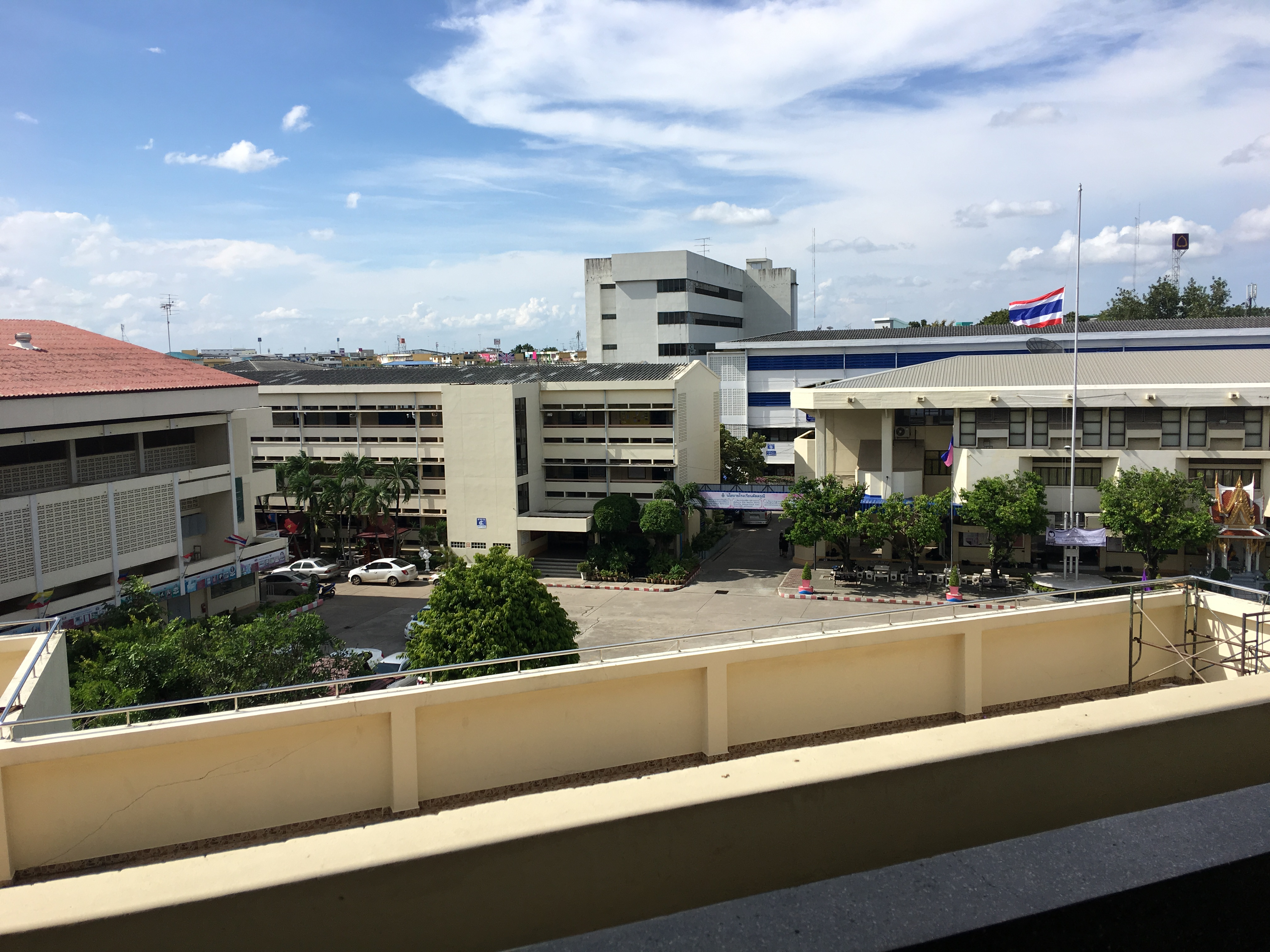
- Chachoengsao, Chachoengsao province Thailand

Information
- Established: 1915; 111 years ago
- Gender: Mixed (formerly); Girls (currently)

Dat Daruni School (Thai: โรงเรียนดัดดรุณี) is a school for girls in Chachoengsao, in Chachoengsao province in central Thailand.

The school was named by King Rama VI. Its opening ceremony was on 22 February 1915. At first, Dat Daruni School was a normal school which taught both boys and girls. The school started teaching students from kindergarten level to secondary level. Later on, the number of students in Dat Daruni School increased, but space in the school was insufficient for the number of students, so they stopped serving primary school students. After that Dat Daruni School only taught secondary students, which is Mathayom 1 to Mathayom 6 (or grade 7–12) and all students are female. After that, the school started offering majors which are science-mathematic major and art majors. Both majors are for Mathayom 4-6 students (or grade 10–12).

Over the past several years, Dat Daruni school has developed their "Intensive English Program" (IEP) into a "Mini-English Program" (MEP) for Mathayom 1-3 students to provide students with more exposure to English. Additionally, the school recently introduced an "Intensive Science Program" (ISP), for students to receive education primarily based on science. There is also an 'English for Integrated Studies' (EIS) program.
