= Ampornpaisarn School =

School in Nonthaburi, Thailand

Location
- Pakkret, Nonthaburi; Thailand
- Coordinates: 13.92567°N 100.52270°E

Information
- Type: Kindergarten through High school
- Website: www.ampornpaisarn.ac.th

Ampornpaisarn School is a school in Nonthaburi that serves students from kindergarten through high school.

== History ==
Ampornpaisarn School started history from Ampornpaisarn Anusorn School which was founded in 1957 at Pra-arthit Road in Bangkok with an area of 928 square metres. This school was started by Than Phu Ying Yosawadi Ampornapisarn, the owner and director of Ampornpaisarn School in Pakkret, Nonthaburi Province. The school honored Ampornapisarn's late husband Luang. The Voravuth Vitayalai School was allowed to change its name to Ampornpaisarn Anusorn School on 18 July 1953. In 1957, a new three-building campus was built; the enrollment was around 500 students. Later, the school had too many students because of the expansion of the school in Pakkret, Nonthaburi on 17 May 1949. The two old schools in Bangkok are defunct and have become a part of the Khao San commercial area for tourists.

== Academic programs ==
- Kindergarten - Students between 3 and 6 years old.
- Elementary - Students between 5 years and 7 years old.
- Middle school
- High school - Science - Math program, Math - English program, English - French program, English - Chinese program
- Boarding school for upper elementary levels is for females only.

== Environment ==
Ampornpaisarn School is surrounded by trees of many species and a large pond. It has an herb garden and yard for children to run and play.

== Activity ==
- Teacher Day
- Global Warming Awareness
- Learning and Teaching
- Inauguration Day
- Field Day
- Recycle and Hazardous Waste Campaign
- Hydroponics Vegetable and Organic Fertiliser
- Refrain from Smoking Campaign
