= Nawaminthrachinuthit Triam Udomsuksa Pattanakarn School =

Location
- 99 Moo 7 Bangna-Trat Rd.(Highway 34) Bang Bo, Bang Bo District, Samut Prakan 10560; Thailand; 13.625315°N 100.848227°E

Information
- School type: Public
- Established: 31 July 1992
- Status: High School
- Authority: Office of the Basic Education Commission
- School number: 1001110204
- Director: Wichan Kingkan
- Language: Thai; English; Chinese
- Colour: Pink-blue
- Song: March Nawaminthrachinuthit Triam Udomsuksa Pattanakarn
- Website: http://www.nmrtup.ac.th

Nawaminthrachinuthit Triam Udomsuksa Pattanakarn School (Thai: โรงเรียนนวมินทราชินูทิศ เตรียมอุดมศึกษาพัฒนาการ), commonly abbreviated as Nawamin Triampat, is a high school located in Bang Bo, Samut Prakan, Thailand It admits lower-secondary and upper-secondary students (mathayom 1–6, equivalent to grades 7–12). Founded in 1978 as a campus school of Triam Udom Suksa Pattanakarn School, Bangkok, Thailand.The school has five permanent buildings. There are six levels M 1-6 (Grade 7–12).

== Buildings ==
- Building 1
- Building 2
- Building 3
- Meeting Building
- Gym
- Greenhouse
- Football Field
- Teacher House
- Hall of fame
- Arts House

== Programs ==
Junior high school

- SSWT (Intensive Science-Math)
- Mini English Program (MEP)
- Science-Math (EIS)
- Normal (EIS)

High school

- Thai-Social
- Arts
- Arts-Business
- Art-Chinese
- Art-English
- Art-English (Performing Arts)
- Art-English (Music)
- Art-Math
- English-Math
- Math-Sci
- Math-Sci (health)
- Math-Sci (tech)
- English-Thai
- Science-Math
- SSWT (Intensive Science-Math)
- IE (Intensive English)
