= Phuwiang Wittayakhom School =

Phuwiangwittayakhom School

Location
- 300/4 Phuwieng district, Khon Kaen province Thailand
- Coordinates: 16.659202°N 102.368281°E

Information
- Type: Co-Educational
- Motto: School of Champions
- Established: 1972; 54 years ago
- School district: Phuwiang district, Khon Kaen
- Principal: Viraisak Wannasri
- Grades: Mattayom 1-6
- Colors: orange and green
- Website: http://web56.pwwk.ac.th/

Phuwiang Wittayakhom School (acronym PWWK) Phuwiang district Khonkaen province is a high school for the Phuwiang district and belongs to the Thai Ministry of Education. The school used a standard curriculum divided into six years from Mattayom 1–6. The number of students is about 3000 and personnel 117. Phuwiangwittayakhom School is classified as an extra-large school with an area of around 16,600 meters (54,500 ft). The school is located at 300/4 Phuwieng district, Khon Kaen province. ภูเวียงวิทยาคม

== History ==
Phuwiangwittayakhom school was established in 1972. The courses that are available at the opening considered only junior high school between Mattayom 1–3. The school was moved to Koot-Nam-Sai national forest with an area of 11000 square meters before being expanded to 16600 square meters in the 1976s. Initially, the school extended into two campuses. The first branch is Phuwiangwittayakhom (Wiangwongkot) in 1991. The second branch is Phuwiangwittayakhom (Wiangnakhon) that opened in 1994.

== Majors ==
For senior high school, students have to choose majors that they want to study. The majors that are available include Math-Arts, English-Chinese Program, Industry-Technology, and Math-Science.

== Participating Projects and Awards ==
- The school joined Plant Genetic Conservation Project in 2009, under the royal initiative of Her Royal Highness Princess Maha Chakri Sirindhorn.
- 2nd runner, Shift and Share Project in 2014s, under the royal initiative of Princess UbolRatana Rajakanya.
- The school participated in the world-class standard school project in 2012
