= Sapphawitthayakhom School =

- โรงเรียนสรรพวิทยาคม

Location
- 51 Prasatwithi Rd. Mae Sot, Tak, 63110; Thailand; 16.713216°N 98.573070°E

Information
- Other name: SW
- Type: Public
- Motto: Kshanti hita sukhawaha
- Established: 30 November 1915; 110 years ago
- Founder: Pra Samaksapphakarn
- School board: Tak Education Service Area Office 2
- Authority: Office of the Basic Education Commission
- Director: Somsak Letrattanapan
- Teaching staff: 86 (130)
- Grades: 7–12 (mathayom 1–6)
- Gender: Co-educational
- Enrollment: 3,260 (2026 academic year)
- Classes: 90
- Language: English and Thai
- Campus type: ลุ่มน้ำเมย
- Colours: Purple and yellow
- Song: Marsh Sapphawitthayakhom
- Website: www.sappha.moe.go.th

Sapphawitthayakhom School (Thai: โรงเรียนสรรพวิทยาคม) is a public school located in Mae Sot, Thailand. It admits secondary students (mathayom 1–6, equivalent to grades 7–12)). The school was founded on 30 November 1915. The student population is 2,500, with 120 staff, 97 of whom are teaching staff.

== Programs ==
In upper-secondary there are six majors:

- Intensive Science Math (ISM)
- Science Math and Technology (SMAT)
- Mini English Program (MEP)
- Multi language Program (MP)
- Arts - Chinese
- Arts - Burmese

== International school standards ==
Sapphawitthayakhom school has run an international curriculum from grade 7 through grade 9 since 2010. In May 2012, Sapphawitthayakhom the school introduced a Mini English Program from Grade 7 through grade 10. All subjects are taught in English except Thai, Burmese and Chinese. The major English Subjects are: Computer, Physics, Core Maths, Biology, Chemistry, Astronomy, Social Studies, Health & Physical Education, Add Maths, Occupation & Technology.
