= Anuban Ratchaburi School =

- โรงเรียนอนุบาลราชบุรี

Location
- 411 Srisuriyawong Road; Muang, Ratchaburi, 70000; Thailand
- Coordinates: 13.5342304°N 99.8080659°E

Information
- Motto: Thai: เลิศคุณธรรม ล้ำวิชาการ สมานสามัคคี Advanced academic excellence, moral harmony
- Established: June 24, 1925
- Authority: Ministry of Education, Thailand
- Principal: Thai: นางปราณี ไทยคุปต์
- Grades: Kindergarten - Grade 6
- Gender: Mixed
- Age: 4 to 13
- Enrollment: 365 as of May 2016
- Color
- Song: Anuban Marching
- Website: www.anubalrct.ac.th

Anuban Ratchaburi School (Thai: โรงเรียนอนุบาลราชบุรี) was established in June 24, 1925 as a mixed school for pupils aged 4 to 13. It is located in Ratchaburi Thailand. is government's school under the supervision of the Office of Private Education Commission (OPEC) and the Ministry of Education (MOE). The school admits boys and girls over the age of 4–13. In accordance with English Program regulations, and Native Thai Program.

Anuban (Thai: อนุบาล) in Thai can be a meaning of kindergarten or "take care of".

== Core curriculum ==
Level	All Program Exams	English Program additional Exams
P1 - P3	NT and O-Net Examinations	Cambridge Young Learners Exams - Starters Movers
P3 - P6	NT and O-Net Examinations	Cambridge Young Learners Exams - Movers, Flyers, Cambridge KET

=== Class levels ===
The curriculum is divided into four levels (according to the development level of students):

Level	Year Group
Level 1	Kindergarten 1–2
Level 1	Primary 1-3 (Grade 1–3)
Level 2	Primary 4-6 (Grade 4–6)

=== Core subjects ===
- Thai
- Mathematics
- Science
- Society, Religion, and Culture
- Health and Physical Fitness
- Careers and Technology
- English Language
