= Singsamut School =

School in Chonburi, Thailand

Coordinates: 12.676138°N 100.893487°E

- Thai: โรงเรียนสิงห์สมุทร

Information
- Former names: Sathanee-Tahanreursattahip School (1937-1944); Tahanreursattahip School (1944-1953); Singsamut School (1953-1959); Sattahip School (1959-1980)
- Enrollment: c.3000-4000

Singsamut School (Thai: โรงเรียนสิงห์สมุทร) is located in Sattahip district, Chonburi province of Thailand. Singsamut School has 3000-4000 students. At first, this school was a school for the children of Navy officials. Later Singsamut School transferred to the Department of Education. Singsamut School is a school with a large area approximately 141 hectares. This area was divided into junior and senior high school by Jaradoll road which is entrance to the Sattahip Naval Command.

== History ==
At present, the Singsamut School is located at Moo1 Sukhumvit road T.Sattahip, A.Sattahip, Chonburi. With an area of 141 acres, 2 square meters.

In 1937, the school was officially named "Sathanee-Tahanreursattahip School".

In 1940, the school moved to the present location.

In 1944, the school was renamed "Tahanreursattahip School".

In 1953, the school was renamed "Singsamut School".

In 1959, the school was renamed "Sattahip School".

In 1980, the navy handed over the school to the Department of Education on 22 December 1980 and changed the name to "Singsamut School", and considered today as the school establishment day.

== Honours ==
2540 (1997) Chalermprakiat Kanchanapisak Library, Ministry of education.

2544 (2001) Study on reform of school leaders, Annual Education Department.

2549 (2006) Vocal Library project.

2549 (2006)-2550 (2007) The school won the gold medal on Ministry of Public Health.

2551 (2008) Prototype library project.

2551 (2008)-2552 (2009) Gold level school health promotion, Ministry of Health.

2553 (2010) World-class Standard School of Basic Education Commission.

2555 (2012) Ms. Chanika Niamngoen is high school students in grade6 honored for outstanding youth of religion and ethics from the Office of National Identity.

2556 (2013) Health and physical education, awarded a gold medal. Competition from health and physical education project of grade1-3.

- Science won the silver medal on small plane control by the radio project.
