= Rayong English Programme School =

Private school in Thailand

Rayong English Programme School (REPS)
- Ban Chang, Rayong; Thailand

Information
- Type: Private
- Motto: Knowledge Character Leadership
- Established: 2004
- Head of School: Grant Gibson
- Website: http://www.repsbanchang.com

Rayong English Programme School, Ban Chang, also known as Royal English Programme School, Ban Chang and REPS Ban Chang, is a small private bilingual school in Rayong, Thailand. REPS is under the supervision of the Office of Private Education Commission (OPEC) and the Ministry of Education (MOE). The school admits boys and girls from 1 year (Nursery 1) through to Grade 12 (Mattayom 6). The school has transport services and a boarding house.
