= Suranaree School =

Coordinates: 14.980346°N 102.102485°E

Sura Nari Wittaya School
- Nakhon Ratchasima; Thailand

Information
- Type: Girls' High School
- Established: May 11, 1905
- Head of school: Mr. Kosol Pongpanichlocation
- Grades: Grades 7–12

Sura Nari Wittaya School is a secondary school in Nakhon Ratchasima, Thailand. The school is an all-girls school for grades 7–12. It was founded on 11 May 1905, and named for the city's 19th century heroine Thao Suranari. It is "Nakhon Ratchasima's top school" according to The Nation newspaper. It is typically oversubscribed, and in March 2007, they saw 500 applicants registered for 480 places at the school. Due to the school's popularity, The headmaster, Mr. Kosol Pongpanich, has said that some parents have offered "huge amounts of cash to secure places for their children." In Grade 10, students have the choice to complete a major in Science-Mathematics, English-Mathematics, English-English, English-Chinese, English-Japanese, English-French, English-Korean etc.

The school's marching band placed first in the 16th World Music Contest in the Netherlands in 2009 and second in the 17th World Music Contest.
