= Srithammarat Suksa School =

Private school in southern Thailand

Coordinates: 8.452202°N 99.959307°E

- Thai: โรงเรียนกัลยาณีศรีธรรมราช

Information
- Former names: The American School (1901-1941)
- Religious affiliation: Christian
- Established: 1901; 125 years ago
- Grades: K-12
- Gender: Boys (formerly); Mixed (currently)
- Enrollment: c.5000
- Average class size: max. 30
- Website: www.sss.ac.th

Srithammarat Suksa School (Thai: โรงเรียนกัลยาณีศรีธรรมราช) is a private Christian school in Nakhon Si Thammarat, Southern Thailand.

== History ==
Srithammarat Suksa School was the first private school in Nakhon Si Thammarat. The school was built in 1901 by a group of U.S. Presbyterian missionaries who came to Nakhon Si Thammarat to teach Christianity. Their leader was Mr. Ekkles. In the early days, the school was called "The American School" and only boys were able to attend the classes. In 1941, during the alliance with Japan, the name of the school was changed from "The American School for Boys" to Sithammaratwittaya School.

The school has grown into a co-educational institution of more than 5,000 students from kindergarten to grade 12.

== English programme ==
The Srithammarat Suksa School English Programme (EP) was started in 2000 and is one of the largest English programs in southern Thailand with students from pre-kindergarten to grade 12. More than 800 students study most of their subjects in English under a faculty of 40 plus native English speaking teachers from a variety of Western countries.

The English Programme is separated into three parts:

- Kindergarten English Programme: KEP
- Primary English Programme: PEP
- Secondary English Programme: SEP

KEP, PEP, and SEP operate classes of no more than 30 students, with several sections for each grade. All classes are taught in teams, with a Thai homeroom teacher or teachers’ assistant working with the native English speaking teacher. There is also an EIP (English Immersion Program) where students from the regular program are taught English by native English speaking teachers.

There are 1,000 English books in the EP library plus a teacher's resource room of books from around the globe. The EP uses curriculum and standards from North America, Singapore, Australia, England, and Thailand.

The EP foreign staff number about 45 from the US, Canada, South Africa, Australia, New Zealand, and the UK. The English Programme purchased and built a new EP campus in 2011. The new facility is the school's third campus (of four).
