= Sriwittayapaknam School =

School in Samut Prakan, Thailand

Coordinates: 13.596025°N 100.600455°E

- Thai: โรงเรียนศรีวิทยาปากน้ำ

Information
- Established: 1955; 71 years ago
- Age: 3 to 15
- Enrollment: 1770
- Website: www.swps.ac.th

Sriwittayapaknam School (Thai: โรงเรียนศรีวิทยาปากน้ำ) is a school in Paknam, Samut Prakan, Thailand. It was founded as a kindergarten in 1955 by Mrs Sawaiwong Sooksri, and has grown to serve some 1,770 students aged 3 to 15 for kindergarten to junior high school levels.
