= Bunyawat Witthayalai School =

Public secondary school in Lampang, Thailand

- โรงเรียนบุญวาทย์วิทยาลัย

Location
- Lampang, Lampang Province; Thailand
- Coordinates: 18.28741659°N 99.501757°E

Information
- Motto: Embrace humanity; let kindness guide your action. บาลี: สมฺมา วายเมเถว ปุริโส ไทย: เป็นคนพึงทำดีร่ำไป
- Established: 1898
- Enrollment: 4,869 (2009)
- Colors: Red and White
- Website: www.bunyawat.ac.th

Bunyawat Witthayalai (Thai: โรงเรียนบุญวาทย์วิทยาลัย) is the first public and biggest secondary school in Lampang, Thailand, and is the largest school in the northern region. It has also long been recognized among top high schools in the northern region and has often been placed in the top ten of the national high school ranking over the recent decade.

From the statistical survey in 2009, the school was ranked in the 5th biggest high school table in Thailand in terms of student body with number of 4869 students.

“Bunyawat Witthayalai” was named after Prince Bunyawat Wongmanit, the last ruling Prince of Lampang, hereditary successor of Chet Ton Dynasty of Lanna Kingdom before occupation of Kingdom of Siam. The school was officially opened by King Vajiravudh (Rama VI) when he was Siamese crown prince on 26 November 1905.

Nowadays, Bunyawat Witthayalai is situated on Hauwiang Road on area of approximately 18 acres adjacent to central downtown Lampang. It provides secondary education from Matthayom 1 -6 (grade 7-12 equivalently) with 8 study plans in high school level including Sciences-Mathematics, Sciences-Mathematics-Japanese, Mathematics-English, English-French, English-German, English-Chinese, English-Japanese and English-Thai-Social Science.

The colours of school are red-and-white with the Pali motto “Sammā Vāyametheva Puriso” which means “Embrace humanity; let kindness guide your action.”

== Programs ==
=== Junior High School Programs ===
Program	Matthayom 1 (Grade 7)	Matthayom 2 (Grade 8)	Matthayom 3 (Grade 9)
Normal Program	==== First Semester ==== Required Subjects (Periods/Week, Credit): 1. TH21101 (ท21101) Thai Language (3, 1.5); 2. MA21101 (ค21101) Mathematics (3, 1.5); 3. SC21101 (ว21101) Science (3, 1.5); 4. SS21101 (ส21101) Social Study (3, 1.5); 5. EN21101 (อ21101) English (3, 1.5); 6. SC21102 (ส21102) History (1, 0.5); 7. HE21101 (พ21101) Health Education (1, 0.5); 8. HE21102 (พ21102) Physical Education (1, 0.5); 9. AR21101 (ศ21101) Art, Music and Dancing (2, 1.0); Additional Subjects: 1. Elective Subject (2, 1.0); 2. Elective Subject (2, 1.0); International Additional Subjects: 1. CH21201 (จ21201) Chinese 1 (1, 0.5); 2. I20201 (I20201) Independent Study (2, 1.0); Learners Development Subjects: 1. LD21901 (ก21901) Counseling (1, 0.5); 2. LD21903-7 (ก21903-7) Discipline (1, 0.5); 3. LD21911-27 (ก21911-27) Grouped Activity (1, 0.5); 4. LD21929 (ก21929) Social Helping (1, 0.5); ==== Second Semester ==== Required Subjects (Second Semester) (Periods/Week, Credit): 1. TH21102 (ท21102) Thai Language (3, 1.5); 2. MA21102 (ค21102) Mathematics (3, 1.5); 3. SC21102 (ว21102) Science (3, 1.5); 4. SS21102 (ส21103) Social Study (3, 1.5); 5. EN21102 (อ21102) English (3, 1.5); 6. SS21102 (ส21104) History (1, 0.5); 7. HE21102 (พ21102) Health Education (1, 0.5); 8. HE21102 (พ21104) Physical Education (1, 0.5); 9. AR21102 (ศ21102) Art, Music and Dancing (2, 1.0); Additional Subjects: 1. Elective Subject (2, 1.0); 2. Elective Subject (2, 1.0); International Additional Subjects: 1. CH21202 (จ21202) Chinese 2 (1, 0.5); 2. I20202 (I20202) Independent Study (Communication) (2, 1.0); Learners Development Subjects: 1. LD21901 (ก21902) Counseling (1, 0.5); 2. LD21903-7 (ก21904-10) Discipline (1, 0.5); 3. LD21911-27 (ก21912-28 Grouped Activity (1, 0.5); 4. LD21929 (ก21930) Social Helping (1, 0.5)	==== First Semester ==== Required Subjects (Periods/Week, Credit): 1. TH22101 (ท22101) Thai Language (3, 1.5); 2. MA22101 (ค22101) Mathematics (3, 1.5); 3. SC22101 (ว22101) Science (3, 1.5); 4. SS22101 (ส22101) Social Study (3, 1.5); 5. EN22101 (อ22101) English (3, 1.5); 6. SS22102 (ส22102) History (1, 0.5); 7. HE22101 (พ22101) Health Education (1, 0.5); 8. HE22102 (พ22102) Physical Education (1, 0.5); 9. AR22101 (ศ22101) Art, Music and Dancing (2, 1.0); Additional Subjects: 1. MA22201 (ค22201) Additional Math (2, 1.0); 2. Elective Subject (2, 1.0); 3. Elective Subject (2, 1.0); International Additional Subjects: 1. CH22201 (จ22101) Chinese 3 (1, 0.5); Learners Development Subjects: 1. LD22901 (ก22901) Counseling (1, 0.5); 2. LD22903-7 (ก22903-7) Discipline (1, 0.5); 3. LD22911-27 (ก22911-27) Grouped Activity (1, 0.5); 4. LD22929 (ก22929) Social Helping (1, 0.5); ==== Second Semester ==== Required Subjects (Periods/Week, Credit): 1. TH22202 (ท22202) Thai Language (3, 1.5); 2. MA22202 (ค22202) Mathematics (3, 1.5); 3. SC22202 (ว22202) Science (3, 1.5); 4. SC22202 (ส22203) Social Study (3, 1.5); 5. EN22202 (อ22202) English (3, 1.5); 6. SS22202 (ส22204) History (1, 0.5); 7. HE22202 (พ22202) Health Education (1, 0.5); 8. HE22202 (พ22204) Physical Education (1, 0.5); 9. AR22202 (ศ22202) Art, Music and Dancing (2, 1.0); Additional Subjects: 1. Elective Subject (2, 1.0); 2. Elective Subject (2, 1.0); International Additional Subjects: 1. CH22202 (จ22202) Chinese 4 (1, 0.5); Learners Development Subjects: 1. LD22901 (ก22902) Counseling (1, 0.5); 2. LD22903-7 (ก22904-10) Discipline (1, 0.5); 3. LD22911-27 (ก22912-28 Grouped Activity (1, 0.5); 4. LD22929 (ก22930) Social Helping (1, 0.5)	M.3
Gifted Math	==== First Semester ==== Required Subjects (Periods/Week, Credit): 1. TH21101 (ท21101) Thai Language (3, 1.5); 2. MA21101 (ค21101) Mathematics (3, 1.5); 3. SC21101 (ว21101) Science (3, 1.5); 4. SS21101 (ส21101) Social Study (3, 1.5); 5. EN21101 (อ21101) English (3, 1.5); 6. SS21102 (ส21102) History (1, 0.5); 7. HE21101 (พ21101) Health Education (1, 0.5); 8. HE21102 (พ21102) Physical Education (1, 0.5); 9. AR21101 (ศ21101) Art, Music and Dancing (2, 1.0); Additional Subjects: 1. MA21201 (ค21201) Additional Mathematics (2, 1.0); 2. MA21203 (ค21203) Augmented Mathematics (2, 1.0); International Additional Subjects: 1. CH21201 (จ21201) Chinese 1 (1, 0.5); 2. I20201 (I20201) Independent Study (2, 1.0); Learners Development Subjects: 1. LD21901 (ก21901) Counseling (1, 0.5); 2. LD21903-7 (ก21903-7) Discipline (1, 0.5); 3. LD21911-27 (ก21911-27) Grouped Activity (1, 0.5); 4. LD21929 (ก21929) Social Helping (1, 0.5); ==== Second Semester ==== Required Subjects (Periods/Week, Credit): 1. TH21102 (ท21102) Thai Language (3, 1.5); 2. MA21102 (ค21102) Mathematics (3, 1.5); 3. SC21102 (ว21102) Science (3, 1.5); 4. SS21102 (ส21103) Social Study (3, 1.5); 5. EN21102 (อ21102) English (3, 1.5); 6. SS21102 (ส21104) History (1, 0.5); 7. HE21102 (พ21102) Health Education (1, 0.5); 8. HE21102 (พ21104) Physical Education (1, 0.5); 9. AR21102 (ศ21102) Art, Music and Dancing (2, 1.0); Additional Subjects: 1. MA21202 (ค21202) Additional Mathematics (2, 1.0); 2. MA21204 (ค21202) Augmented Mathematics (2, 1.0); International Additional Subjects: 1. CH21202 (จ21202) Chinese 1 (1, 0.5); 2. I20202 (I20202) Independent Study (Communication) (2, 1.0); Learners Development Subjects: 1. LD21901 (ก21902) Counseling (1, 0.5); 2. LD21903-7 (ก21904-10) Discipline (1, 0.5); 3. LD21911-27 (ก21912-28) Grouped Activity (1, 0.5); 4. LD21929 (ก21930) Social Helping (1, 0.5)	[icon]	[icon]
Smart Science	[icon]	[icon]	[icon]
English Program	[icon]	[icon]	[icon]

=== English Program ===
Bunyawat Witthayalai School set up its English Program in 2003 with the help and guidance of the Department of General Education as a way to address the growing needs for intensive English-language instruction and to comply with the continuing educational reform agenda now in progress to enhance Thai students' English proficiency.

The pilot program aims to:

1.Produce students with an adequate command of the English language both as a communication tool, and as a way to open the doors to an expanded knowledge base.

2.Produce students who are capable of using English as a medium to develop their thought processes, analytical skills, and logical problem-solving skills, together with improving their self-confidence and sense of belonging to a regional and global community.

3. To create a model for other Thai schools to follow in developing their own English teaching methods and programs.

== Buildings ==
- Chao Po Bunyawat's monument. (อนุสาวรีย์เจ้าพ่อบุญวาทย์)
- Phra Puth Pavilion. (ศาลาพระพุทธ)
- The Shrine of Chao Po Kuan (ศาลเจ้าพ่อกว้าน)
- Building 1: Khunakorn (คุณากร)
     - 1st floor is where Department of Finance, Department of Administration, Department of Management, Department of Register, Department of Accounting, Student's Guide office, and Department of Business office.
     - 2nd floor is Internet Servers and Internet Administration office.

- Building 2: Bowornwit (บวรวิทย์)

    - 1st floor is the Department of Science, Biology, Chemistry and Physics Teacher's Room. Smart Science Student's Room and Hemantanusorn Meeting Room are also on this floor.
   - 2nd floor is Laboratory for Junior High School, Physics Lab, and the room for Earth, Astronomy, and Space class.
   - 3rd floor is Laboratory for Senior High School, Physics, and Biochem (BC).

-Building 3: Phisitmethee (พิสิฐเมธี) is The Building for Grade 7 Students.

   - 1st floor is Department of Social Study, Religion and History Teacher's room, and also Grade 9 Room.
   - 2nd floor is Asean Study Room, and Room for Grade 7 Students.
   - 3rd floor is Sufficiency Economy Room and Room for Grade 7 Students.
   - 4th room is The Room of Morality and Room for Grade 7 Students.

- Keeratikhun (กีรติคุณ) is Classroom and Teacher's Room Music Department and Dancing Art Department. - Vibunpool 1 (วิบุลพล 1) Volleyball Field - Vibunpool 2 (วิบุลพล 2) Department of Arts. - Kusonkasem (กุศลเกษม) Classroom and Teacher's Room for Home Economics Department. - Former Prempracha (เปรมประชา) Now This Building is Knocked Down - Siwalai (ศิวาลัย) Planting Class and Teacher's Room. - Witayapitch (ไวทยพิชญ์) Grade 9 Students' Room. and Department of Math - Jittapath (จิตภัสสร์) Classroom for Grade 8 - 9 Students, and Head of Department of Thai Language - Samathagiet (สมรรถเกียรติ) is Cafeteria and Meeting room on 2nd floor. - Shamannachanrangsrit (สมานฉันท์รังสฤษฎ์) is the Grade 10 Students' room. English Program Room and Department of Foreign Languages. - Manit Thanrong (มานิตย์ธำรงค์) is the Last Building in School, Built Like an "L" Letter, Used at least 49,000,000 Bath ($1,392,400) to build it. including Library, Computer Lab (Moved from Khunakorn Building), - Prempracha is Department of Physical Education, Health Education, and Basketball Field. -Bunchu Trithong is Meeting Hall, Built by Mr. Boonchu Trithong. Former Minister of Bureau of University.

== Sources ==
- http://www.bwc.ac.th
- http://www.obec.go.th
