= Samutsakhonburana School =

- Thai: โรงเรียนสมุทรสาครบูรณะ

Location
- Mahachai, Samut Sakhon; Thailand
- Coordinates: 13.548113°N 100.275476°E

Information
- Other name: S.K.N.
- Type: High school
- Established: 1912; 114 years ago
- Campus type: Provincial

Samutsakhonburana School (abbreviated as S.K.N.) (Thai: โรงเรียนสมุทรสาครบูรณะ) is a provincial coeducational high school in Mahachai, Samut Sakhon, Thailand. The school was built as a school for women at Tha Chaloam, Samut Sakhon in 1912 by Khunsamutmaneerat (Mangha Maneerat). Samutsakhonburana School was subsequently rebuilt at Mahachai and transformed into a coeducational school.

== History ==
In 1912, Khunsamutmaneerat built a school for girls at Moo 5, Tha Chaloam, Samutsakhon. He hired teachers from Bangkok. Then people around the school asked Khunsamutmaneerat to change this school to a coeducational school. At that time Khunsamutmaneerat changed the school to be coeducational school and named the school Bumrungwittaya School. Many years later, Khunsamutmaneerat moved Bumrungwittaya School to Moo 4, Tha Chaloam, Samutsakhon. After that, the ownership of this school change to the government and it became a provincial school.

In 1929, Bumrungwittaya School was moved to Mahachai, Samutsakhon, and its name was changed to Samutsakhon Provincial School for Girls by Mrs. Fin Sitthisarakarn, first director of the school. The first class of this school was on 17 May 1929. At that time, this school had four teachers and 70 students. Mr. Aumpai Dangsuwan was the student who had the first student ID. In 1933, Khunprajitdarunpat, the director of provincial education in Samutsakhon, needed to move Samutsakhon Provincial School for Girls to the Shooting Range. And this school was built in 1934. After that, Samutsakhon Provincial School for Girls changed name to Samutsakhon School for Girls “Samutsakhonburana”. In 1968, Samutsakhon School for Girls “Samutsakhonburana” changed from school for girls to coeducational school, and changed name to Samutsakhonburana School. In 1988, Samutsakhonburana School and the Young Buddhists Association of Thailand bought computers for educational services to students and others. In 1988, Samutsakhonburana School spent ฿7,750,000 to build a 3 multipurpose building. Two years later, S.K.N. spent ฿10,100,100 to demolish the old auditorium, located in the East, and built a five-classroom building instead. In 1997, S.K.N. spent ฿26,900,000 to build a seven-classroom building. At that time, Samutsakhonburana School male admission increase to 30 percent by all students.
