= Benchamatheputhit School =

Secondary school in Phetchaburi, Thailand

Location
- 184/2 Kirirathaya street, Klong Kracheang, Mueang Phetchaburi District, Phetchaburi; Thailand
- Coordinates: 13.114436°N 99.938743°E

Information
- Type: Public school (government funded)
- Established: August 1, 1917 (100 years)
- Founder: HRH Princess Maha Chakri Sirindhorn, Princess Chulalongkorn
- Grades: 7–12 (Mathayom 1–6)
- Classrooms: 75 classrooms
- Website: http://www.bmp.ac.th/

Benchamatheputhit School (BMP) (Thai:โรงเรียนเบญจมเทพอุทิศ) is a high school in Phetchaburi Province, Thailand. It is a large secondary school that receives co-education students and open from grade 7 to grade 12.

== Etymology ==
"Benchamatheputhit" from Sanskrit language pancha (เบญจ / Pañca) meaning five, maha meaning great, deva meaning god, and Uthit (อุทิศ / Uddissa) meaning "dedicated to" or "in honor of", thus "dedicated to five great gods" or "in honor of five great gods".

== History ==
In 1910, people in Phetchaburi donated 2,700 baht to build a statue of King Rama V to commemorate the palace Ram Palace (Wang Ban Puen Palace), but was not used. King Rama V died on October 23, 1910. Phyathai Srisawat was governor of Phetchaburi at that time. He asked to use the donation to build a provincial women's school. Named Benchamatheputhit School, the first teaching session was held on 1 August 1917.

== Study Program ==
=== For Secondary (Grade M1-3) ===
- Science – Mathematics Program

- English Program(EP)

- Normal Program

- Math Science Bilingual Program(HUB)

=== For Upper Secondary (Grade 10-12) ===
- Science Program

- Science – Mathematics Program

- English - France Program

- English – Mathematics Program

- English – Chinese Program

- Science – Math Bilingual Program(HUB)

== Classroom Styles ==
- Scientific Laboratory

- Green room

- Mathematic Smart Classroom

- Computer Lab

- English Corner

- AFS

== Schools Affiliated with Benchamatheputhit school ==
- Benjamarachutit Ratchaburi

- Benchamaracharungsarit

- Benchama Maharat

- Benjamarachutit

- Benchamabophit

- Benchamarachuthit

- Benjamarachutit Pattani

- Benjamarachanusorn

== See also ==
- Gurukula, Gurukula is a traditional system of religious education of Indian-oriign religions like Hinduism and Buddhism in which Lord Buddha also studied
- Guru–shishya tradition, followed by Hindu Buddhists
- Sanskrit and Vedic learning
- Education in Thailand
- List of universities and colleges in Thailand
