= Na Wang district =

Na Wang นาวัง
- District
- District location in Nong Bua Lamphu province
- Coordinates: 17°19′22″N 102°4′21″E
- Country: Thailand
- Province: Nong Bua Lamphu
- Seat: Na Lao

Area
  - Total: 326.4 km^{2} (126.0 sq mi)

Population (2005)
  - Total: 37,316
  - Density: 114.3/km^{2} (296/sq mi)
- Time zone: UTC+7 (ICT)
- Postal code: 42170
- Geocode: 3906

Na Wang (Thai: นาวัง; IPA: [nāː wāŋ]) is a district (amphoe) in the western part of Nong Bua Lamphu province, northeastern Thailand.

== Geography ==
Neighboring districts are (from the east clockwise): Na Klang and Si Bun Rueang of Nong Bua Lamphu Province and Erawan and Na Duang of Loei province.

== History ==
The district was established on 30 April 1994, when five tambons were split off from Na Klang district. It was upgraded to a full district on 11 October 1997.

== Administration ==
The district is divided into five sub-districts (tambons), which are further subdivided into 51 villages (mubans). Na Lao is a township (thesaban tambon) which covers parts of tambons Na Lao and Thep Khiri. There are a further five tambon administrative organizations (TAO).

No.	Name	Thai name	Villages	Pop.
1.	Na Lao	นาเหล่า	13	8,778
2.	Na Kae	นาแก	10	8,139
3.	Wang Thong	วังทอง	12	8,672
4.	Wang Pla Pom	วังปลาป้อม	8	6,848
5.	Thep Khiri	เทพคีรี	8	4,879
