= Mueang Nong Bua Lam Phu district =

District of Nong Bua Lam Phu, Thailand

Mueang Nong Bua Lam Phu เมืองหนองบัวลำภู
- District
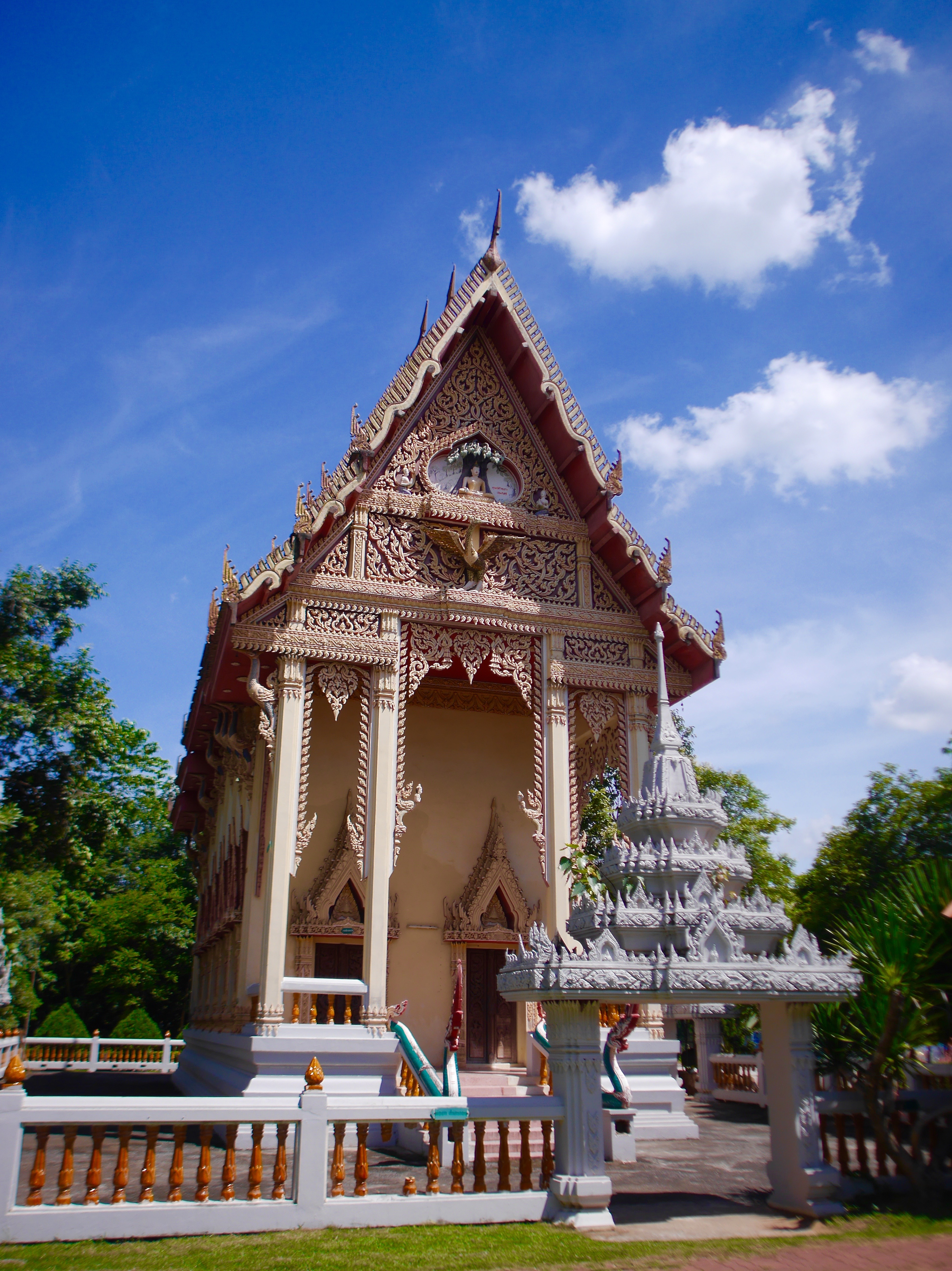
- Wat Sri Khun Mueang Royal Temple within the district

- District location in Nong Bua Lam Phu province
- Coordinates: 17°12′15″N 102°26′40″E
- Country: Thailand
- Province: Nong Bua Lam Phu

Area
  - Total: 907.562 km^{2} (350.412 sq mi)

Population (2010)
  - Total: 134,116
  - Density: 147.776/km^{2} (382.738/sq mi)
- Time zone: UTC+7 (ICT)
- Postal code: 39000
- Geocode: 3901

Mueang Nong Bua Lam Phu (Thai: เมืองหนองบัวลำภู, pronounced [mɯ̄aŋ nɔ̌ːŋ būa lām pʰūː]; Northeastern Thai: เมืองหนองบัวลำภู, pronounced [mɯ̂aŋ nɔ̌ːŋ bùa lâm pʰûː]) is the capital district (amphoe mueang) of Nong Bua Lam Phu province, northeastern Thailand. As of the year 2010, it has a total population of 134,116.

== Geography ==
Neighboring districts are (from the south clockwise): Non Sang, Si Bun Rueang, and Na Klang of Nong Bua Lam Phu Province; Kut Chap and Nong Wua So of Udon Thani Province.

== History ==
On September 2, 1993, the districts of Nong Bua Lam Phu, Na Klang, Non-Sang, Si Bun Ruang and Suwannakhuha were separated from Udon Thani Province and were merged to create the Nong Bua Lamphu Province. Nong Bua Lam Phu District was renamed Mueang Nong Bua Lam Phu.

== Administration ==
The district is divided into 15 sub-districts (tambons), which are further subdivided into 179 villages (mubans). The town (thesaban mueang) Nong Bua Lam Phu covers parts of tambons Nong Bua, Pho Chai, and Lam Phu. There are three townships (thesaban tambon): Hua Na, Na Mafueang, and Na Kham Hai. Each covers parts of the same-named tambon. There are a further 13 tambon administrative organizations (TAO).

| No. | Name | Thai name | Villages | Pop. |
|---|---|---|---|---|
| 1. | Nong Bua | หนองบัว | 15 | 12,733 |
| 2. | Nong Phai Sun | หนองภัยศูนย์ | 10 | 6,633 |
| 3. | Pho Chai | โพธิ์ชัย | 12 | 5,595 |
| 4. | Nong Sawan | หนองสวรรค์ | 10 | 6,944 |
| 5. | Hua Na | หัวนา | 16 | 9,937 |
| 6. | Ban Kham | บ้านขาม | 14 | 9,715 |
| 7. | Na Mafueang | นามะเฟือง | 10 | 9,432 |
| 8. | Ban Phrao | บ้านพร้าว | 15 | 9,434 |
| 9. | Non Khamin | โนนขมิ้น | 10 | 7,824 |
| 10. | Lam Phu | ลำภู | 12 | 9,674 |
| 11. | Kut Chik | กุดจิก | 14 | 11,538 |
| 12. | Non Than | โนนทัน | 10 | 6,932 |
| 13. | Na Kham Hai | นาคำไฮ | 11 | 10,651 |
| 14. | Pa Mai Ngam | ป่าไม้งาม | 13 | 8,437 |
| 15. | Nong Wa | หนองหว้า | 7 | 4,613 |
