= Sarakhampittayakhom School =

Location
- Nakhon Sawan Road; Maha Sarakham, 44000; Thailand
- 16.186445°N 103.298947°E

Information
- School type: Secondary school Government Secondary School
- Established: 1906
- Director: Dr. Nipon Yosda
- Grades: 7–12 (mathayom 1–6)
- Gender: Coeducational
- Age range: 11-17
- Enrollment: 4,000 + (2018 academic year)
- Average class size: 30-50
- Language: Thai
- Campus type: Urban
- Colours: Yellow, Blue
- Website: http://www.spk.ac.th/

Sarakhampittayakhom School (Thai: โรงเรียนสารคามพิทยาคม) is a public secondary school in Thailand. It is the main public high school and largest in Maha Sarakham Province, located around the central main town district or Amphoe Muang. The school admits Mathayom levels 1 to 6 (Grades 7–12).

It started in 1906 as a school for boys in the Positaram temple, then later was established as a formal coeducational school on July 10, 1913. The school gradually grew larger through the years and has now over 3,000 students.

The school has specialized programs for students such as the English Program (EP), with various subjects taught in the English Language by foreign teachers, Thai subjects, and a Gifted Program, which focuses on Math and Science subjects taught in Thai.

== Safety and Student Welfare ==
Sarakhampittayakhom School (Thai: โรงเรียนสารคามพิทยาคม) prioritizes a secure, fair, and highly disciplined environment to ensure the comprehensive well-being of its student body. The administration enforces strict safety protocols and maintains a firm stance on campus security and student conduct.

Disciplinary Standards and Code of Conduct The institution fosters a culture of mutual respect where both students and faculty members are treated with the utmost dignity. To safeguard the learning environment, the school strictly enforces its code of conduct. Individuals who engage in inappropriate or harmful behavior face decisive disciplinary actions, ranging from formal reprimands to expulsion.

Pastoral Care and Support While disciplinary boundaries are firmly established, the campus culture is deeply rooted in mutual care. Faculty members are widely recognized for their supportive, family-like approach to education, often treating and guiding students with the same care, mentorship, and dedication they would offer their own children. This balance of firm discipline and empathetic pastoral care creates a nurturing environment where students can thrive both academically and personally.
