= Si Bun Rueang district =

Si Bun Rueang ศรีบุญเรือง
- District
- District location in Nongbua Lamphu province
- Coordinates: 16°57′57″N 102°16′48″E
- Country: Thailand
- Province: Nong Bua Lamphu
- Seat: Mueang Mai

Area
  - Total: 830.643 km^{2} (320.713 sq mi)

Population (2005)
  - Total: 107,804
  - Density: 129.8/km^{2} (336/sq mi)
- Time zone: UTC+7 (ICT)
- Postal code: 39180
- Geocode: 3904

Si Bun Rueang (Thai: ศรีบุญเรือง, pronounced [sǐː būn rɯ̄aŋ]; Northeastern Thai: ศรีบุญเฮือง, pronounced [sǐː bùn hɯ̂aŋ]) is a district (amphoe) in the southwestern part of Nong Bua Lamphu province, northeastern Thailand. It may also be spelled Sri Bun Rueang.

== History ==
The area was Ban Non Sung Plueai of Tambon Yang Lo, Nong Bua Lamphu District, Udon Thani province. The government created it to be a minor district (king amphoe) on 16 July 1965, which was upgraded to a full district on 1 March 1969.

== Geography ==
Neighboring districts are (from the north clockwise) Na Wang, Na Klang, Mueang Nong Bua Lamphu, and Non Sang of Nong Bua Lamphu Province, Nong Na Kham and Si Chomphu of Khon Kaen province, Phu Kradueng, Pha Khao, and Erawan of Loei province.

The important water resource is the Phong River.

== Administration ==
The district is divided into 12 sub-districts (tambons), which are further subdivided into 153 villages (mubans). There are two townships (thesaban tambons): Non Sung Plueai covers parts of tambon Mueang Mai, and Chom Thong covers parts of tambon Si Bun Rueang. There are a further 12 tambon administrative organizations (TAO).

No.	Name	Thai name	Villages	Pop.
1.	Mueang Mai	เมืองใหม่	15	10,913
2.	Si Bun Rueang	ศรีบุญเรือง	15	10,594
3.	Nong Bua Tai	หนองบัวใต้	10	7,294
4.	Kut Sathian	กุดสะเทียน	8	5,276
5.	Na Kok	นากอก	23	15,750
6.	Non Sa-at	โนนสะอาด	17	12,367
7.	Yang Lo	ยางหล่อ	15	8,954
8.	Non Muang	โนนม่วง	11	8,423
9.	Nong Kung Kaeo	หนองกุงแก้ว	12	7,159
10.	Nong Kae	หนองแก	11	8,093
11.	Sai Thong	ทรายทอง	9	8,478
12.	Han Na Ngam	หันนางาม	8	4,503
