= Samutprakan School =

Public school in Samut Prakan, Thailand

Coordinates: 13.5859°N 100.6067°E

Samut Prakan School
- โรงเรียนสมุทรปราการ

Location
- 498 Sukhumvit Road; Pak Num sub-district, Mueang Samut Prakan District, Samut Prakan (Thai: เทศบาลนครสมุทรปราการ), Samut Prakan, 10270; Thailand

Information
- Type: Public school
- Established: 1883
- Founder: Chulalongkorn
- School board: The Secondary Educational Service Area Office 6
- School number: 0-2387-0307
- Grades: Mathayom 1–6
- Language: Thai language; English; Japanese; Chinese
- Colours: Blue; Yellow
- Flower: Pterocarpus macrocarpus
- Website: www.prakan.ac.th

Samut Prakan School (Thai: โรงเรียนสมุทรปราการ) is a public school in Samut Prakan Province, Thailand. The school is coeducational, teaches junior high school and high school level. Samut Prakan School was a boys school in the past. The school has nine permanent buildings. There are six levels M 1–6. Each class has 12 rooms.

== History ==
Prince Krom Phraya Damrong Rachanupab established the school as a primary school at Wat Klang, Paknam Muang, Samut Prakan on 18 July 1883. Samut Prakan School began teaching its first year in 1883. In 1917 the Ministry of Justice, the Wat Klang school was renamed Klang High School in 1926 and The Ministry of Education changed the name of the school to Samut Prakan.

== Programs ==
junior high school

- Science - Math
- Science
- English Programs
- normal

high school

- Science - Math
- Science
- EnglishPrograms
- Arts - Math
- Arts - English
- Arts - French
- Arts - Japanese
- Arts - Chinese
- Account
- Agriculture - Industry
