= Nong Bua Lamphu =

Nong Bua Lam Phu หนองบัวลำภู
- Town
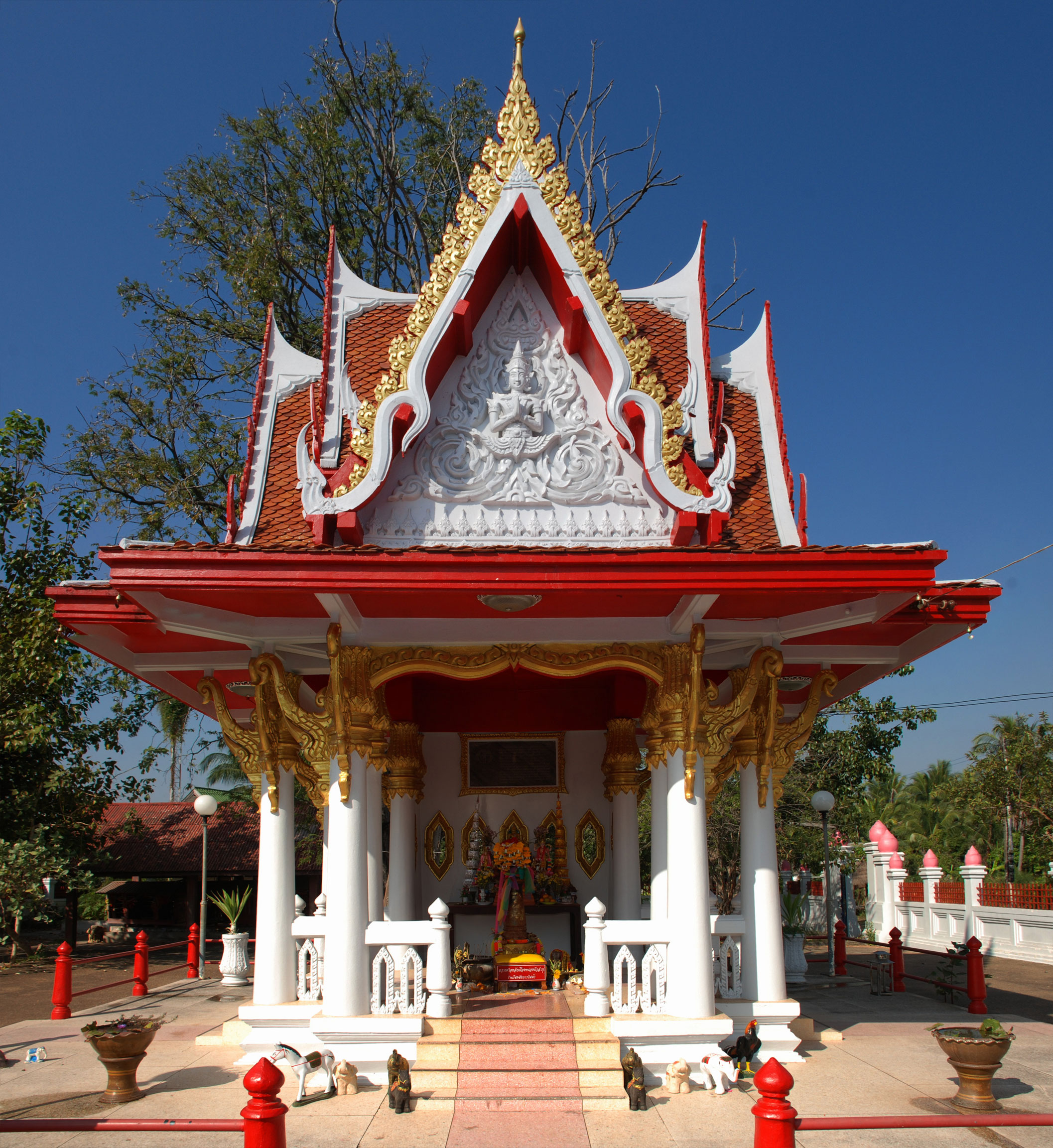
- City pillar shrine (lak mueang) for Nong Bua Lam Phu

- Location within Thailand
- Coordinates: 17°12′15″N 102°26′40″E
- Country: Thailand
- Province: Nong Bua Lam Phu

Area
  - Total: 39.5 km^{2} (15.3 sq mi)

Population (2008)
  - Total: 21,072
  - Density: 533/km^{2} (1,380/sq mi)
- Time zone: UTC+7 (ICT)

Nong Bua Lam Phu (Thai pronunciation: [nɔ̌ːŋ būa lām pʰūː]) is a town in Thailand, capital of Nong Bua Lamphu Province. It is on the central eastern border of the province, approximately 45 kilometers south-west of the city of Udon Thani and from there, accessed by route 210. The town lies 536 km north-north-east of Bangkok.

== Climate ==
Climate data for Nong Bua Lamphu (1991–2020)
Month	Jan	Feb	Mar	Apr	May	Jun	Jul	Aug	Sep	Oct	Nov	Dec	Year
Record high °C (°F)	35.9 (96.6)	38.7 (101.7)	42.1 (107.8)	43.6 (110.5)	43.1 (109.6)	39.5 (103.1)	40.0 (104.0)	36.3 (97.3)	35.9 (96.6)	36.8 (98.2)	35.8 (96.4)	35.4 (95.7)	43.6 (110.5)
Mean daily maximum °C (°F)	29.8 (85.6)	32.1 (89.8)	34.7 (94.5)	36.2 (97.2)	34.7 (94.5)	33.4 (92.1)	32.6 (90.7)	32.1 (89.8)	32.2 (90.0)	32.2 (90.0)	31.3 (88.3)	29.4 (84.9)	32.6 (90.6)
Daily mean °C (°F)	23.9 (75.0)	25.5 (77.9)	28.7 (83.7)	30.4 (86.7)	29.8 (85.6)	29.2 (84.6)	28.9 (84.0)	28.3 (82.9)	28.1 (82.6)	27.7 (81.9)	26.2 (79.2)	24.0 (75.2)	27.6 (81.6)
Mean daily minimum °C (°F)	17.3 (63.1)	19.1 (66.4)	22.2 (72.0)	24.5 (76.1)	24.9 (76.8)	25.1 (77.2)	24.9 (76.8)	24.6 (76.3)	24.4 (75.9)	23.2 (73.8)	20.4 (68.7)	17.5 (63.5)	22.3 (72.2)
Record low °C (°F)	9.3 (48.7)	8.6 (47.5)	14.5 (58.1)	15.5 (59.9)	20.7 (69.3)	23.0 (73.4)	21.5 (70.7)	22.0 (71.6)	20.9 (69.6)	17.5 (63.5)	15.5 (59.9)	9.3 (48.7)	8.6 (47.5)
Average precipitation mm (inches)	8.5 (0.33)	53.2 (2.09)	35.5 (1.40)	70.0 (2.76)	187.2 (7.37)	169.3 (6.67)	151.6 (5.97)	229.9 (9.05)	203.3 (8.00)	118.6 (4.67)	55.8 (2.20)	7.5 (0.30)	1,290.4 (50.81)
Average precipitation days	2.8	3.0	4.8	7.7	16.0	15.5	19.2	20.8	17.2	9.7	2.4	2.0	121.1
Source: Thai Meteorological Department

== See also ==
- Mueang Nong Bua Lam Phu District, the capital district of Nong Bua Lam Phu Province
