= List of international schools in Thailand =

There are 166 international schools in Thailand as of June 2016, according to the Office of the Private Education Commission (OPEC), which regulates the operation of all private schools in the country. This is a comprehensive list, sorted by province, then alphabetically.

== OPEC-regulated schools ==
School name	Province
ABC Pathways International Kindergarten	Bangkok
The American School of Bangkok, Sukhumvit Campus	Bangkok
Anglo Singapore International School	Bangkok
Anglo Singapore International School Sukhumvit 31	Bangkok
Annabel's Early Years International Kindergarten	Bangkok
Ascot International School	Bangkok
The Australian International School Bangkok	Bangkok
Bangkok Advent School	Bangkok
Bangkok Adventist International School	Bangkok
Bangkok Christian International School	Bangkok
Bangkok Grace International School	Bangkok
Bangkok Patana School	Bangkok
Bangkok International Preparatory and Secondary School	Bangkok
Berkeley International School	Bangkok
Blooming Buds International Kindergarten	Bangkok
British Columbia International School Bangkok	Bangkok
Brighton College Bangkok	Bangkok
Bromsgrove International School	Bangkok
Bromsgrove International Primary School	Bangkok
Charter International School	Bangkok
Crescent International School	Bangkok
Centurion International School Bangkok	Bangkok
The Early Learning Centre International School	Bangkok
Ekamai International School	Bangkok
The First Steps International Pre-School	Bangkok
Garden International School Bangkok	Bangkok
Glory Singapore International School	Bangkok
Harrow International School, Bangkok	Bangkok
Heathfield International School	Bangkok
International Community School	Bangkok
International Montessori Center	Bangkok
International Pioneers School	Bangkok
IPC International Kindergarten	Bangkok
Ivy Bound International School	Bangkok
Josuikan Bangkok International School	Bangkok
Keerapat International School	Bangkok
Kensington International Kindergarten	Bangkok
Kevalee International School	Bangkok
Kevalee International Day School	Bangkok
KiddyKare International Kindergarten	Bangkok
Kids' Academy International Pre-School	Bangkok
Kids Kingdom International Kindergarten	Bangkok
Kidz Village International Kindergarten	Bangkok
Kincaid International School	Bangkok
Kinder Bear Academy International Preschool	Bangkok
Kirakira Kids International Kindergarten	Bangkok
KIS International School	Bangkok
Kobato International Kindergarten	Bangkok
Korean International School of Bangkok	Bangkok
King's College International School Bangkok	Bangkok
Ladybird International Kindergarten	Bangkok
Learning Home International Kindergarten	Bangkok
Little House International Pre-School	Bangkok
Lycée Français International de Bangkok	Bangkok
Melodies International Kindergarten	Bangkok
Modern International School Bangkok	Bangkok
Modern Montessori International Pre-School	Bangkok
Montessori Academy Bangkok International School	Bangkok
Mulberry House International Pre-School	Bangkok
New Bambino International Kindergarten	Bangkok
New Sathorn International School	Bangkok
NIST International School	Bangkok
Niva International School	Bangkok
OISCA International Kindergarten	Bangkok
Pan-Asia International School	Bangkok
Parkplace International Pre-School	Bangkok
Prep International Kindergarten	Bangkok
Prep Montessori International Kindergarten, Ladprao 88 Campus	Bangkok
Ramkhamhaeng Advent International School	Bangkok
Rasami British International School	Bangkok
RC International School	Bangkok
Regent's International School, Bangkok	Bangkok
Royce Royal International School, Bangkok	Bangkok
Ruamrudee International School	Bangkok
Sabai-Jai International Kindergarten	Bangkok
St. Andrews International School Bangkok	Bangkok
St. Andrews International School, Dusit	Bangkok
St. Andrews International School, Sathorn	Bangkok
St. Andrews International School, Sukhumvit 107	Bangkok
St. George's International School	Bangkok
Saint John's International School	Bangkok
St. Mark's International School Bangkok	Bangkok
St. Michael's International Kindergarten	Bangkok
St. Stephen's International School	Bangkok
Seeh Phinong International Kindergarten	Bangkok
Shrewsbury International School	Bangkok
Singapore International School of Bangkok	Bangkok
Takenoko International Kindergarten	Bangkok
Talents International Pre-School	Bangkok
Thai Sikh International School of Bangkok	Bangkok
Thai–Japanese Association School	Bangkok
The Tiny Seeds International Pre-School	Bangkok
Topsy Turvy International School	Bangkok
Traill International School	Bangkok
Trinity International School	Bangkok
Wellington College International School Bangkok	Bangkok
Wells International School	Bangkok
Wells International School On Nut Campus	Bangkok
Wells International Kindergarten	Bangkok
Youth Exchange International School	Bangkok
Manorom International Christian School	Chai Nat
Panyaden International School	Chiang Mai
American Pacific International School	Chiang Mai
American Pacific International Kindergarten	Chiang Mai
Chiang Mai International School	Chiang Mai
Christliche Deutsche Schule Chiang Mai	Chiang Mai
Chiang Mai Montessori International School	Chiang Mai
Future Leaders International School	Chiang Mai
Grace International School	Chiang Mai
Hana Christian International Kindergarten	Chiang Mai
Lanna International School	Chiang Mai
Nakornpayap International School	Chiang Mai
Prem Tinsulanonda International School	Chiang Mai
Singapore International School Chiang Mai	Chiang Mai
Southeast Asia International School	Chiang Mai
Meritton British International School	Chiang Mai
Chiang Rai International Christian School	Chiang Rai
Chiang Rai International School	Chiang Rai
Areeyawit International School	Chiang Rai
One Hope International School	Chiang Rai
Gainesville International School	Chiang Rai
International School of Chonburi	Chon Buri
ISE International School	Chon Buri
Ladybird International Kindergarten	Chon Buri
Mooltripakdee International School	Chon Buri
Regents International School Pattaya	Chon Buri
Tara Pattana International School	Chon Buri
Lovell International School	Chon Buri
Thai–Japanese Association School Sriracha	Chon Buri
Theodore International School	Chumphon
Khon Kaen International School	Khon Kaen
Global Village School Lanta	Koh Lanta
British International School Krabi	Krabi
Krabi International School	Krabi
Nawattaphume International School Lampang	Lampang
Adventist International Mission School – Korat	Nakhon Ratchasima
Anglo Singapore International School Nakhon Ratchasima	Nakhon Ratchasima
St. Stephen's International School, Khao Yai Campus	Nakhon Ratchasima
Wesley International School	Nakhon Ratchasima
International Christian School of Nonthaburi	Nonthaburi
Hampton International Preschool	Nonthaburi
International School Bangkok	Nonthaburi
Little Dragons International School	Nonthaburi
Magic Years International School	Nonthaburi
Ruamrudee International School, Ratchapruek	Nonthaburi
St. Andrews Samakee International School	Nonthaburi
Global Indian International School	Pathum Thani
Sathit Pathum Demonstration School	Pathum Thani
Siam International School	Pathum Thani
Cambridge College (Thailand)	Phitsanulok
British International School, Phuket	Phuket
HeadStart International School	Phuket
Kajonkiet International School Phuket	Phuket
Lighthouse International School Phuket	Phuket
QSI International School of Phuket	Phuket
Rawai Progressive International School	Phuket
United World College Thailand	Phuket
Hua Hin International School	Prachuap Khiri Khan
Garden International School Rayong	Rayong
St. Andrews International School, Green Valley	Rayong
Silver Fern International School	Roi Et
The American School of Bangkok, Green Valley Campus	Samut Prakan
Concordian International School	Samut Prakan
Didyasarin International Preparatory School	Samut Prakan
PPMAS-SINGAPORE International School	Samut Prakan
Raffles American School Bangkok	Samut Prakan
Singapore International School Suvarnabhumi	Samut Prakan
Thai-Chinese International School	Samut Prakan
Thai Sikh International School	Samut Prakan
Thai-Singapore International School	Samut Prakan
VERSO International School	Samut Prakan
Norwich International School	Samut Sakhon
Adventist International Mission School	Saraburi
California Prep International School	Saraburi
John Wyatt Montessori Nongdon	Saraburi
Saint John Mary International School	Saraburi
Bloomsbury International School Hatyai	Songkhla
American Prep International School Hatyai	Songkhla
Southern International School Hatyai	Songkhla
The International School of Samui	Surat Thani
Si Ri Panya International School, Koh Phangan	Surat Thani
PBISS (formerly Panyadee), The British International School of Samui	Surat Thani
Surat Thani International School	Surat Thani
Balance International School	Surat Thani
Unicorn British International School	Surat Thani
Daniel International School	Surat Thani
Lamai International School, Koh Samui	Surat Thani
Greenacre International School, Koh Samui	Surat Thani
Ubon Adventist International Mission School	Ubon Ratchathani
International Community School Udon Thani	Udon Thani
Udon Thani International School	Udon Thani
Hua Hin International School	Prachuap Khiri Khan

== Other schools ==
A few other international schools operate outside the purview of the OPEC. These include:

- Siam Singapore International School, Bangkok, operated as a department of Valaya Alongkorn Rajabhat University.
- Mahidol University International Demonstration School, Nakhon Pathom, operated as a department of Mahidol University.

== See also ==
- Education in Thailand
- International Schools Association of Thailand
- List of international schools
- List of schools in Thailand
