= International Schools Association of Thailand =

- Pak Kret, Nonthaburi; Thailand

Information
- Type: Associations of International School
- Established: 1994
- President: Ms. Usa Somboon
- Website: www.isat.or.th

International Schools Association of Thailand (ISAT) is an association of private international schools in Thailand, headquartered in Pak Kret, Nonthaburi Province in Greater Bangkok. Its principal 'raison d'etre' is to act as a link between its 45-member international schools, on the one hand, and the Ministry of Education and the Office of the Private Education Commission in particular.

== History ==
The International Schools Association of Thailand was established in 1994. During the past year, ISAT has been extensively involved with the Department of Export Promotion in the joint marketing of international education both in Thailand and overseas.

== Objectives ==
The issues of new education legislations and educational reforms have also featured high on the agenda over the past year. ISAT has lent its support to this process through assistance in in-service training by arranging placement for Thai teachers and administrators in international schools where they are able to observe modern approaches to teaching and learning first hand.

In addition to disseminating information to its members on educational issues both at home and overseas, its regular meeting provide a forum for discussion, debate and the exchange of views and information. The organization of in-service training courses, particularly in the fields of cross-cultural management and Thai language teaching, also features highly on the list of ISAT's priorities.

The promotion of Thai language and culture in international schools and support for charitable causes are other major aims of the Association as is support for culture and sporting links between international schools in Thailand and abroad and between international schools and Thai educational institutions.

== Members Accreditation ==
The quality of education offered at the International Schools Association of Thailand’s (ISAT) member schools has been recognized by accreditation organizations such as the Western Association of Schools and Colleges (WASC), the New England Association of Schools and Colleges (NEASC) and the Council of International Schools (CIS).

== Members ==
ISAT has over 75 member schools offering a range of curricula from American, British and International Systems.

- Adventist International Mission School
- American Pacific International School
- American School of Bangkok
- Anglo Singapore International School
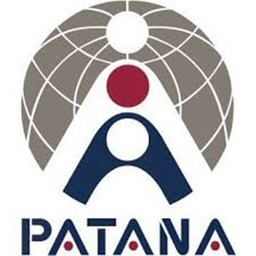
  Bangkok Patana School
- Bangkok Patana School
- British International School, Phuket
- Bromsgrove International School Thailand
- Chiang Mai International School
- Chiang Rai International School
- Concordian International School
- Ekamai International School
- Garden International School (Rayong) & Bangkok
- Grace International School
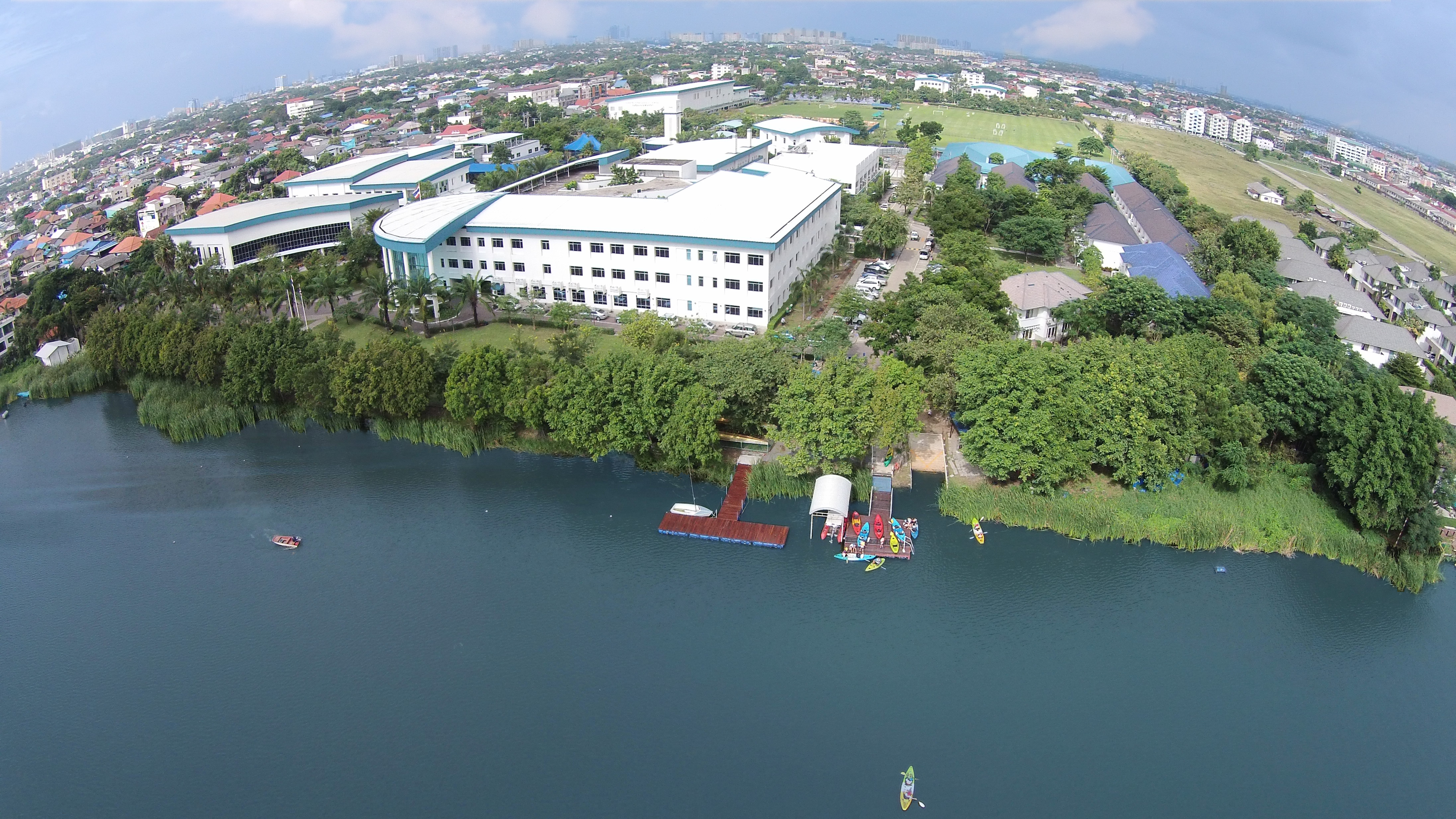
  Harrow Bangkok
- Harrow International School
- Heathfield International School
- International Community School
- International School Bangkok
- KIS International School
- Korean International School of Bangkok
- Lanna International School
- Lycée Français International de Bangkok
- Nakorn Payap International School
- New Sathorn International School
- NIST International School
- Niva International School
- Modern Montessori International Pre-School
- Pan-Asia International School
- Panyaden International School
- Prem Tinsulanonda International School
- Ramkhamhaeng Advent International School
- RIS Swiss Section - Deutschsprachige Schule Bangkok
- Ruamrudee International School, Bangkok
- Royce Royal International School
- Saint John's International School
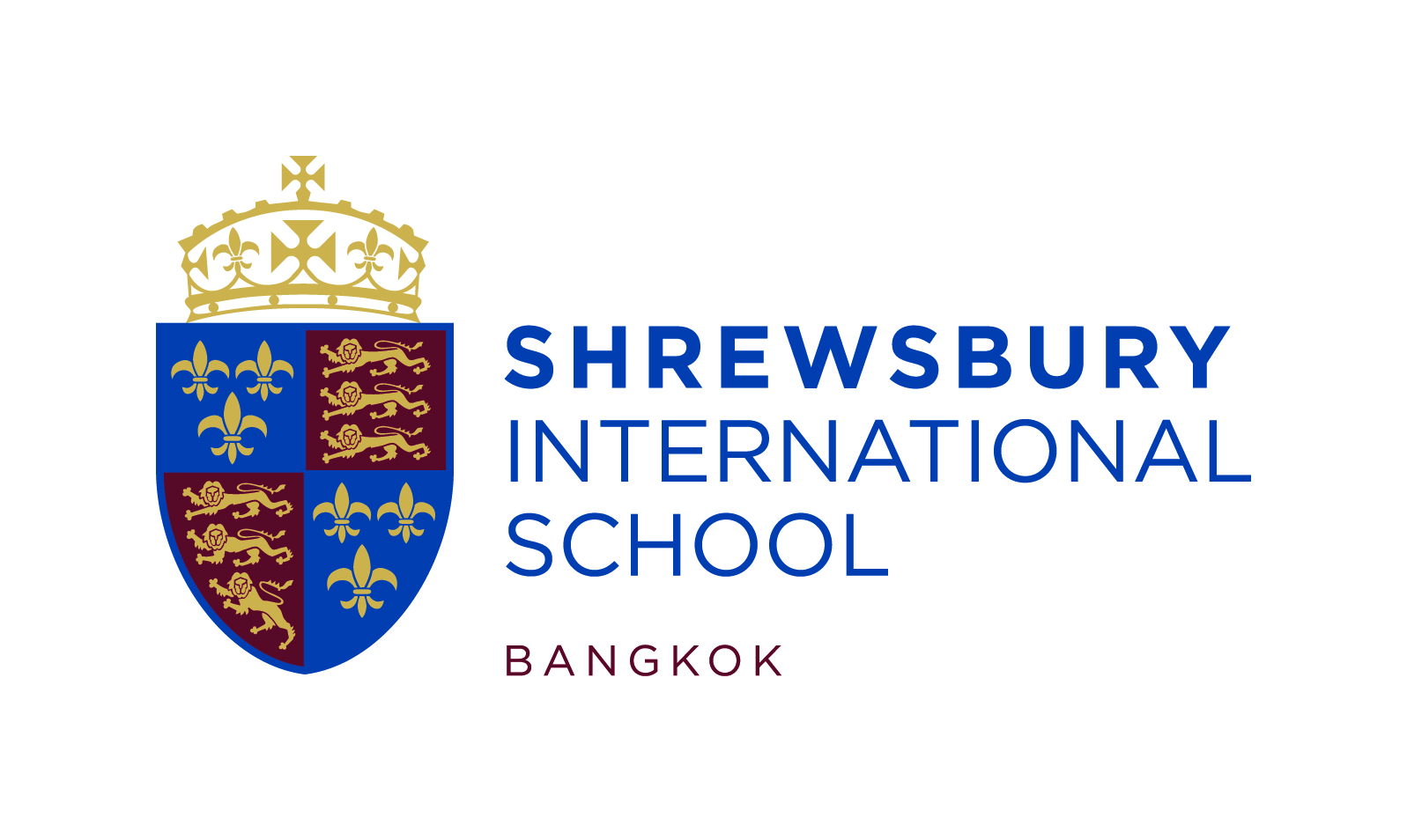
  Shrewsbury Bangkok
- Shrewsbury International School
- Silver Fern International School
- Singapore International School of Bangkok
- St Andrews International School Bangkok
- St. Andrews International School, Rayong
- St. Andrews Samakee International School
- Thai-Chinese International School
- Thai-Japanese Association School
- Thai Sikh International School
- The Early Learning Centre
- The Regent's School
- Traill International School
- Wells International School

== See also ==
- List of international schools in Thailand
