= ISE International School =

- โรงเรียนนานาชาติภาคตะวันออก

Location
- 282 Moo 5 Bowin; Chonburi, 20230; Thailand
- Coordinates: 13°2′40.00″N 101°2′46.76″E

Information
- School type: Independent, International
- Established: 1994
- CEEB code: 000000
- Chief Financial Officer: Chalie Chuvapituck
- School Superintendent: Mr. Alexander Bennett
- Grades: PreK3 - Grade 12
- Enrollment: approximately 300
- Education system: IB
- Language: English
- Campus: Rural
- Colours: Blue; Yellow
- Athletics: EARCOS, MRISSA
- Mascot: Eagle
- Annual tuition: ฿000,000 - ฿000,000 ($00,000 - $00,000)
- Affiliations: East Asia Regional Council of Overseas Schools (EARCOS), International Schools Association of Thailand (ISAT)
- Website: www.ise.ac.th

ISE, formerly known as the International School Eastern Seaboard (Thai: โรงเรียนนานาชาติภาคตะวันออก, RTGS: Rong Rian Nana Chat Phak Tawan-aok), is a private, co-educational international school founded in 1994. ISE sets amidst the rolling hills of the Burapha Golf Course in Chonburi province, Thailand, and offers an American style international curriculum, presented in English from Pre-school through Grade 12. The school also offers the International Baccalaureate (IB) program in the High School. ISE is fully accredited through The Western Association of Schools and Colleges.

== Accreditation and affiliation ==
ISE is an International Baccalaureate school. It is also a member of the ISAT, the International Schools Admission Test. It is also involved in ESAC (Eastern Seaboard Athletics Conference) and EAPISA (East Asia Pacific International School Association). ISE is certified by the Thai Ministry Of Education (MOE) and is also fully accredited by WASC (Western Association Schools and Colleges). An organization which gives certification to the public that the school is a trustworthy institution of learning.

== Admissions ==
In order to be admitted to the school, the student must submit the required ISE documents to the main ISE office. An interview with the parents will follow the entrance test. A decision on acceptance, grade placement and date to start classes will be made after completion of the admissions process. When a student is accepted, a place is offered in a specific grade level. The family should confirm acceptance. The accepted family will visit the ISE business office personnel regarding payment. The accepted family will visit the ISE bookstore for uniform and student supplies.

== Activities ==
Numerous activities are offered either after school or during the activity block in the middle and high school.

== Assessment ==
ISE relies on Standards Based Grading, which is a system that reports student proficiency in a number of specific learning goals or standards. This system gives students an achievement level that represent their proficiency in each of the skill assed rather than giving students one grade on a particular class.

Below is a description of achievement levels, as part of the school's standards based report cards:

- Exemplary (EX) – This rare level of achievement describes evidence that demonstrates exemplary performance in relation to the standards.
- Proficient (PR) – This level of achievement describes evidence that demonstrates mastery performance in relation to the standards.
- Approaching (AP) – This level of achievement describes evidence with some mastery in relation to the standards.
- Concern (CO) – This level of achievement describes evidence that demonstrates limited mastery in relation to the standards.

== Campus ==
ISE International School opened in August, 1994. It was previously known as the International School Eastern Seaboard. The school was established by Northbridge Companies to meet the needs of the growing area. The school started with 35 students and has since grown to close to 300 students from around the world. The school is authorized to offer the IB Diploma Programme and is WASC accredited.

Campus is divided by elementary school, high school, gyms and Fine Art center. The high school building has 3 floors with a library, a media center, 3 science laboratories, two computer labs, an art room, and 12 regular classrooms. The elementary school campus has 4 buildings with a library, a computer lab, music rooms, two science labs and 19 regular classrooms. For the outdoor sports facilities, ISE has 2 gymnasia, one field and several playgrounds for pre-school children. ISE have swimming pool or tennis court, but all ISE students have access to the swimming pool and tennis court at the Burapa golf course.

== Curriculum ==
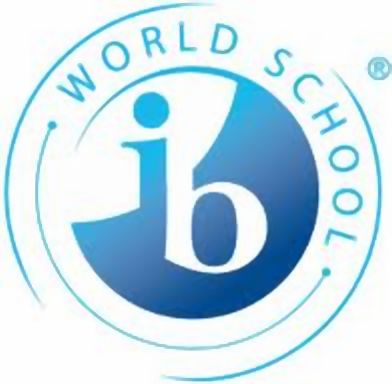
IB diploma logo

ISE is a licensed IB school that runs the International Baccalaureate program. All classes, with the exception of second language courses, are taught in English. IB starts at eleventh grade and continues on to the end of twelfth grade when students receive their IB diploma. This is an option students would choose at the end of tenth grade to decide on what schools they want to go or what they want to do. Students from ISE have gone on to study at the following institutions of higher learning:

- Washington State University
- Chulongakorn University

== Fine Arts Center ==
The board of directors approved the concept and construction of a Fine Arts Center contract in November 2012, and all permits and approvals from the Province of Chonburi and Ministry of Education were received. In the early hours on Thursday February 9, 2013, construction began with an opening ceremony. Teachers, students, engineers and members of the press were in attendance for the official ceremony of what will be the new fine arts center for the school. Finally, on May 10, 2014, after 430 days of construction, it was finally completed. Saturday May 14 an opening ceremony was held.

The Fine Arts Centre includes a 306-seat theatre embedded with art light and sound system. Furthermore, there are music classrooms, dance studios, practice and storage rooms. There is a large conference center as well as exhibition areas to display student artwork. The aim is for the Center to become a cultural and artistic center, not only for the ISE community, but also the greater community in this area.

== History ==
The rapid development of Thailand’s Eastern Seaboard created a demand for a high quality international school. In response to this demand, the International School Eastern Seaboard (ISE) was developed. The International School Eastern Seaboard (ISE) was developed by Northbridge Communities and opened in August, 1994. With students from the areas in Chonburi and Rayong. Within four years the number of students on role had increased to over 300.

== Sports ==
Participation in sport is an integral part of the overall program at ISE. All students are expected to be involved in an athletic activity in addition to their classes and clubs. ISE's athletic teams participate in the Eastern Seaboard Athletic Conference (ESAC) in which students both middle and high school are able to compete in tournaments with other International schools in the region.

== School demographics ==
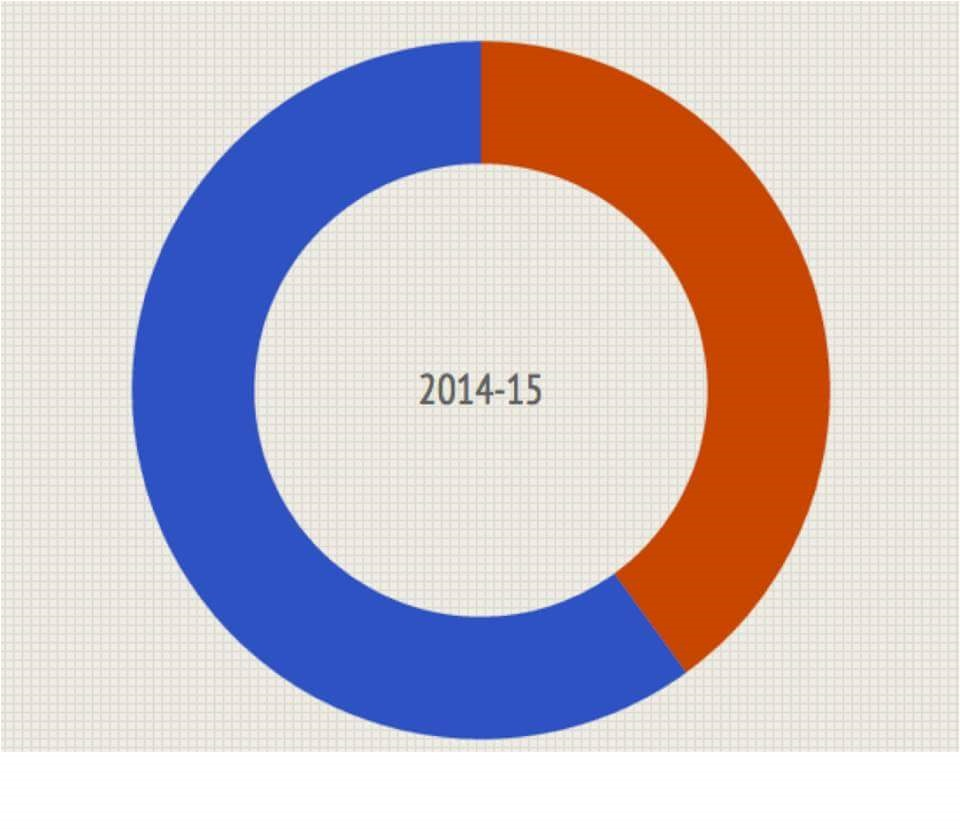
Ise demographics

The student gender percentage including ES and SS is 60% male and 40% female. From the student nationality comparison, most students consists of the Thai nationality with 124 people. The second nationality with the most people are Koreans with 65 students. Third is Japanese, fourth being Australian. The class capacity of ES has the average of 19 and the class with most students is grade 5 with 24 students. The average class capacity of SS is 25 and the classes with the highest capacity are grade 12 and 9 with 30 students.
