= Plaifah Kyoka Shodladd =

Plaifah Kyoka Shodladd (Thai: ปลายฟ้า เคียวกะ โชติรัตน์) is a Thai-Japanese LGBTQ rights activist. Shodladd, who identifies as non-binary, Founded Queering Bangkok, co-founded the Asian Pride Alliance (APA) and served as a member of the parliamentary committee on same-sex marriage in Thailand.

Shodladd graduated from VERSO International School in 2024 and started their Education at New York University in 2026

In October 2024, Kyoka was named one of the TIME 100 Next leaders for representing the new generation of LGBTQ advocates in Asia, alongside Thai Prime Minister Paetongtarn Shinawatra. In 2025, They were also included in the DAZED 100 list, which spotlighted them as part of a new generation of Thai queer activists.[3]
