= Heathfield Knoll School =

School in Wolverley, Worcestershire, England

Coordinates: 52.407092°N 2.242396°W

Heathfield Knoll School and First Steps Day Nursery

Location
- Wolverley Road; Wolverley; Kidderminster, Worcestershire, DY10 3QE; England

Information
- Type: Registered charity (No. 1098940)
- Motto: Servare Mentem
- Established: 1620
- Founder: William Sebright
- Ofsted: Reports
- Chairman of Trustees: Doug Jackson
- Head teacher: Lawrence Grenville Collins
- Age: Three Months to 18
- Enrolment: 250
- Houses: 4 Victoria Brintons Grosvenor Tomkinsons
- Affiliations: Heathfield International, Thailand
- Website: https://www.hkschool.org.uk

Heathfield Knoll School and Nursery is a small, independent, non-denominational day school and nursery in Wolverley, near Kidderminster in Worcestershire, England, for boys and girls aged three months to 19 years.

The school is a member of the Independent Schools Association and the Independent Schools Council.

The School is divided into six sections: Sixth Form, Upper School, Middle School, Lower School, and Early Years. The other section is the Connect Base, a specialised SEND base.

Heathfield Knoll also have a head of safeguarding, as led by Teresa Stooksbury and office manager is Julie Onions.

== History ==
Heathfield School has its origins in 1620, when Wolverley Grammar School was founded by William Sebright. This was renamed Sebright School in 1931, when it occupied new buildings on a greenfield site opened by the then local MP Stanley Baldwin who shortly afterwards became prime minister. Financial difficulties forced the school to close down in 1970, and its main premises became a state school (now Wolverley C E Secondary School). However, its junior section which had opened in 1961, remained in existence and has extended its age range back up to 18.

Heathfield now has an international affiliate in Bangkok, Thailand, the former Lord Shaftesbury School, now renamed Heathfield International School.

In January 2017, Heathfield School and the Knoll School merged to create the current Heathfield Knoll School and First Steps Day Nursery.

== Performance ==
All Heathfield's GCSE candidates achieved at least five A* to C grades in 2007 and again in 2008.

The school was inspected by the Independent Schools Inspectorate in September 2008. The report found that the school met its aims of providing a healthy balance of academic and extra-curricular activities. Pastoral care was described as "outstanding" and the school's relationship with the local community was also commended. Overall teaching was good, although access to computer facilities needed expanding. Literacy and numeracy skills were found to be strongly promoted. The curriculum was well planned. Test results were well above, and in maths and science far above, the national average. There had been achievements in sports, music and drama.

== See also ==
- List of English and Welsh endowed schools (19th century)
