= KIS International School =

KIS International School Bangkok
- โรงเรียนนานาชาติเคไอเอส
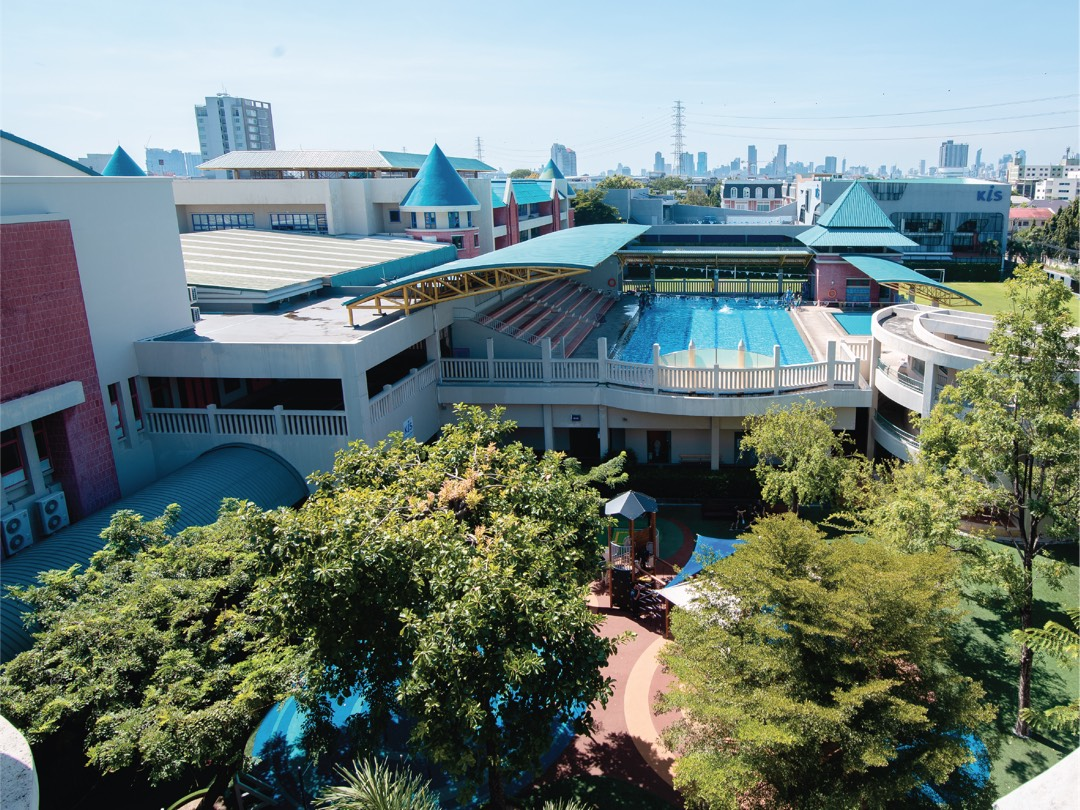

Location
- Bangkok; Thailand; 13°46′19″N 100°35′22″E

Information
- Type: International School
- Established: 19988
- Locale: 999/123-4 Kesinee Ville, Pracha Utit Road, Huay Kwang 10320, Bangkok, Thailand
- Head of School: Dr. Carolyn Mason Parker
- Grades: K-12
- Enrollment: 800
- Colors: Blue; Green
- Mascot: Wolves
- Website: www.kis.ac.th

KIS International School (Thai: โรงเรียนนานาชาติเคไอเอส, RTGS: Rong Rian Nana Chat Khe Ai Aet) is a co-educational full International Baccalaureate world school in Bangkok, Thailand, serving students ages 3 to 18.

KIS is located close to the city center in Huai Khwang District, Bangkok, Thailand.

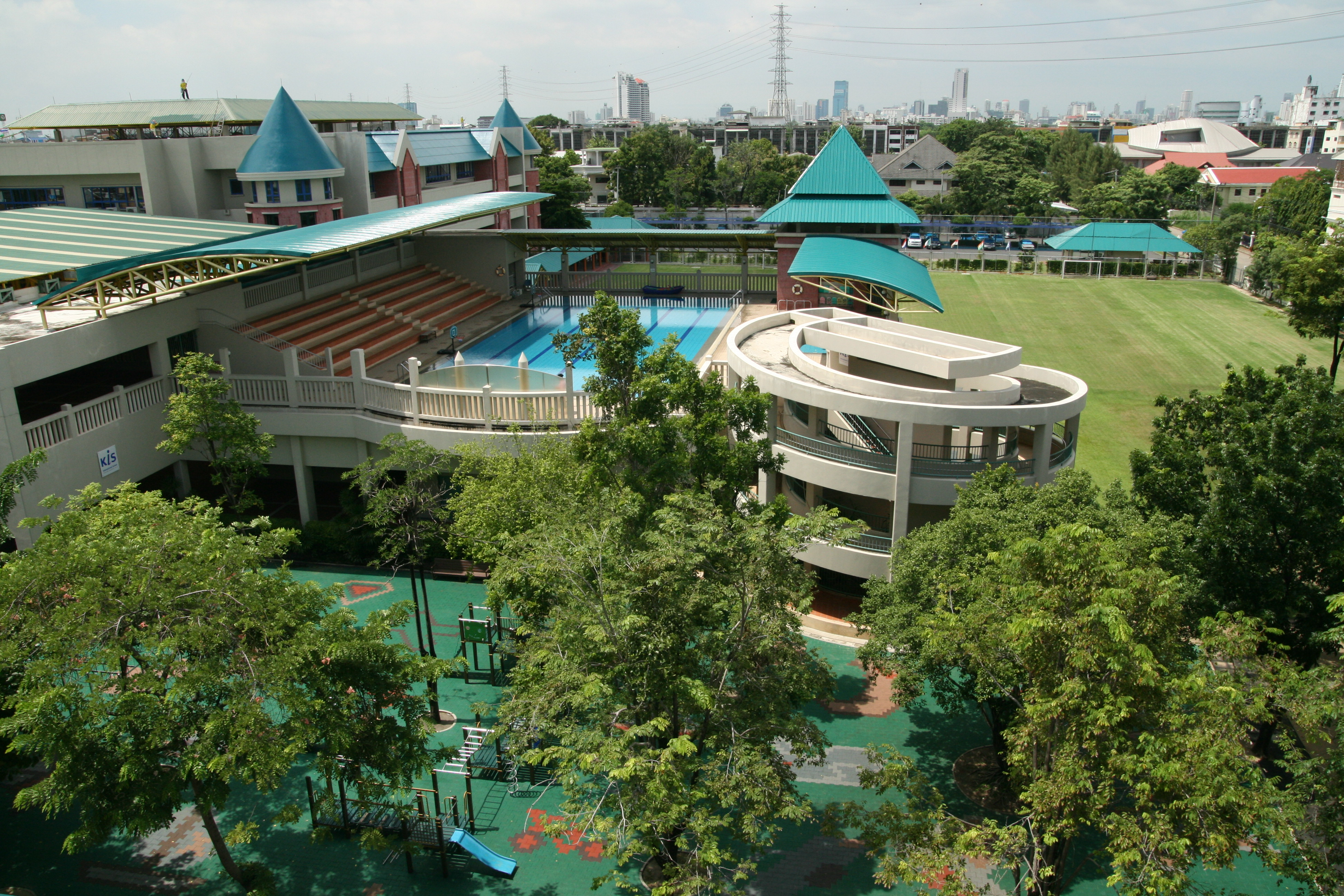
Campus

== Academics and curriculum ==
- The Primary Years Programme (aged 3 – 11)
- The Middle Years Programme (aged 11 – 16)
- The IB Diploma Programme (aged 16 – 18)
- The IB Career-Related Programme (aged 16 – 18)

== Professional accreditation and affiliation ==
- IB World School – Authorized by International Baccalaureate (IB)
- Accredited by The Council of International Schools (CIS)
- Licensed by Kingdom of Thailand Ministry of Education
- Member of The International Schools Association of Thailand (ISAT)
- Member of Thailand International School Activities Conference (TISAC)
- Member of EARCOS (The East Asia Regional Council of Schools)
- Member of Mekong River International Schools Association (MRISA)

== History ==
KIS was opened in 1998 as Kesinee International School Bangkok, offering Kindergarten and Primary education, with the IB Primary Years Programme.

In 2003, the school rebranded from Kesinee International school to KIS International School Bangkok, and embarked on its secondary school expansion plan, introducing the IB Middle Years Programme, along with a new secondary school facility built to suit the requirements of both the MYP and the IB Diploma programme.

The co-educational school provides day school facilities to students aged 3 to 18.

The school is a member of EARCOS and is accredited by CIS and ONESQA. The school is affiliated to the International Baccalaureate board and offers the International Baccalaureate (IB) Primary Years Programme, IB Middle Years Programme, IB Diploma Programme curriculum and IB Career-related Programme.

KIS has over 800 students ranging from 3 – 19 years of age with a student/teacher ratio of 8:1.

== Notable faculty ==
- Park Eason (Umich SNS 1985), KIS International School Bangkok IB Environmental Systems and Science and high school science teacher for nearly two decades; inspired hundreds of students, imbuing them with great passion regarding scientific endeavors and the environment; passed peacefully fighting Leukemia in Oct. 2025. He was a flagship teacher, embodying the KIS values and the IB learner profiles with his unique, inclusive, and interactive teaching style. He was often heard saying "and things like that" and "go get smart somewhere else". Instead of simply indoctrinating his beloved students, he was often seen encouraging students to explore science outside of class by providing external resources like documentaries, books, and articles.
