= American School of Bangkok =

- โรงเรียนอเมริกันกรุงเทพ
- Bangkok; Thailand

Information
- Type: International school
- Motto: "The School of Leaders"
- Established: 1983
- Chairman: Lakhana Didyasarin
- Principal: Connie Kim (Sukhumvit); Nisanart Dharmageisirattana (Green Valley)
- Grades: Pre-K to Grade 12
- Campus: Sukhumvit; Green Valley
- Colors: Red, Navy, Yellow, and White
- Accreditation: Western Association of Schools and Colleges (WASC), Thai Ministry of Education, Thai Office for National Education Standards and Quality Assessment, East Asia Regional Council of Overseas Schools (EARCOS)
- Abbreviation: ASB
- Website: www.asb.ac.th

The American School of Bangkok (ASB; Thai: โรงเรียนอเมริกันกรุงเทพ, RTGS: Rong Rian Amerikan Krung Thep), a member of the International Schools Association of Thailand, is an international school in the Bangkok Metropolitan Area, Thailand. The school has two campuses, the Sukhumvit campus in the Watthana District of Bangkok and the Bangna campus in the Bang Phli District, Samut Prakan Province.

Opened in 1983, ASB offers private education and is accredited by the Western Association of Schools and Colleges (WASC), the Thai Ministry of Education, the Office for National Education Standards and Quality Assessment, and the East Asia Regional Council of Overseas Schools (EARCOS). The school reports that its student body represents around 40 nationalities.

Both campuses offer a pre-kindergarten through high school program. Students are educated in a US curriculum which features inquiry-based learning, project-based learning in middle school, and advanced placement (AP) classes in high school. ASB is a designated AP school, and as part of its community outreach program the school orders and processes AP exams for students who attend other institutions.

ASB Green Valley hosts the International Preparatory Golf Academy (IPGA), which trains more than 100 youth golfers each year. The program has produced numerous tournament-winning players and over 40 students have earned golf scholarships to universities in the United States.

In late 2022, the Sukhumvit campus of the American School of Bangkok was acquired by XCL Education, together with D-PREP International School, as part of XCL’s expansion into Thailand.

The school is a member of the Bangkok International Schools Athletic Conference (BISAC) as well as the Thailand International Schools Athletic Conference (TISAC), and fields teams in many sports. The ASB basketball team has won championships and tournaments (especially the varsity team). ASB also competes in sports such as baseball and football, and the baseball teams have won tournaments. ASB stresses community service and holds charitable fund-raising events including the annual Sukhumvit Fair which has raised money for causes in Thailand and abroad.
