= Thai-Chinese International School =

Private international school in Samut Prakan Province, Thailand

- 泰國中華國際學校 โรงเรียนนานาชาติไทย-จีน
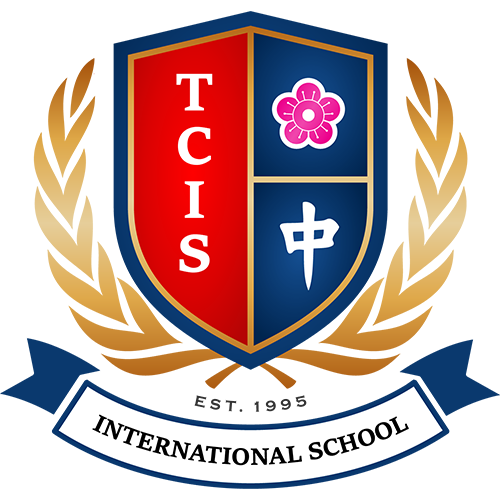

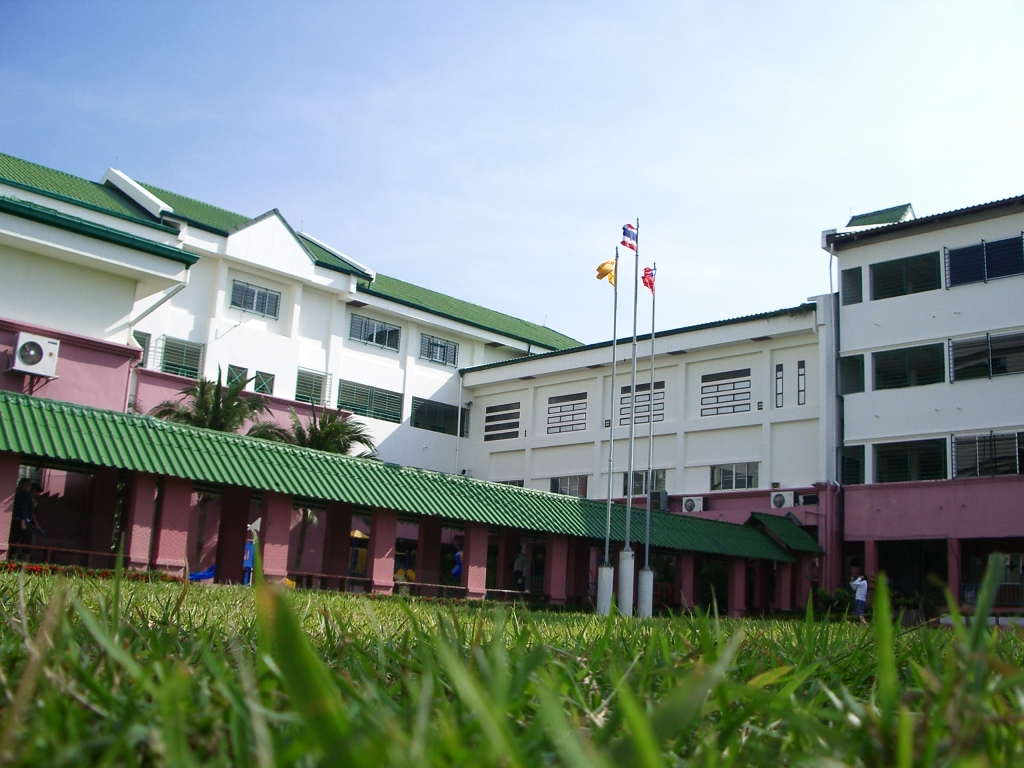

Location
- 101/177 Moo 7 Soi Mooban Bangpleenives, Prasertsin Road, Bangplee Yai; Samut Prakan Province, 10540; Thailand
- Coordinates: 13.626919°N 100.6992813°E

Information
- School type: Private International School
- Motto: Learning from the Past. Living in the Present. Looking to the Future.
- Established: 1995
- Gender: Co-educational
- Education system: American-based system
- Language: English, Chinese, and Thai
- Hours in school day: Eight
- Accreditation: Western Association of Schools and Colleges(WASC), The Private Education Commission of the Thai Ministry of Education(Thailand)
- Website: www.tcis.ac.th

Thai-Chinese International School

Chinese name
- Traditional Chinese: 泰國中華國際學校
- Simplified Chinese: 泰国中华国际学校
Transcriptions
Standard Mandarin
- Hanyu Pinyin: Tàiguó Zhōnghuá Guójì Xuéxiào
- Wade–Giles: T'ai-kuo Chung-hua Kuo-chi Hsüeh-hsiao

Thai name
- Thai: โรงเรียนนานาชาติ ไทย-จีน

Thai-Chinese International School (TCIS; Chinese: 泰國中華國際學校; pinyin: Tàiguó Zhōnghuá Guójì Xuéxiào; Thai: โรงเรียนนานาชาติไทย-จีน, RTGS: Rong Rian Nana Chat Thai Chin) is a private, non-profit day school in Bang Phli District, Samut Prakan Province, in the Bangkok Metropolitan Region of Thailand.

The school was founded in 1995 for the Taiwanese and Thai communities. The curriculum includes multilingual education in English, Chinese, and Thai.

== History ==
The Taiwanese Ministry of Education previously oversaw the school and designated it as an overseas Taiwanese school. It removed TCIS from the list on 1 February 2006 since TCIS was unable to conform to Taiwanese curriculum standards.

== Accreditation ==
Thai-Chinese International School is licensed under by:

- The Private Education Commission of the Thai Ministry of Education
- The Western Association of Schools and Colleges (WASC)

== Membership ==
- East Asia Regional Council of Overseas Schools (EARCOS)
- International Schools Association of Thailand (ISAT)

=== Curriculum Overview ===
Thai-Chinese International School operates under USA’s Common Core curriculum at all grade levels, and Advanced Placement courses for high school. The Common Core, curriculum used by most states in America, is a set of specific academic standards. These learning goals outline what a student should know and be able to do at the end of each grade.

== Students ==
The students are drawn from many nationalities. Many of the students in the Thai-Chinese International School are Taiwanese or Thai, but there are also American, Canadian, British, Latin American, Japanese, Korean, and Filipino students.

== University entry ==
Thai-Chinese International School students choose to go to university in many countries, including the United States, the United Kingdom, Australia, Canada, Taiwan, Japan, South Korea, and Thailand.

== Athletics ==
The school has several sports and athletic activities including football, basketball, volleyball, golf, swimming, softball, and weight training. TCIS is a member of, and competes in, the Bangkok International Schools Athletic Conference (BISAC).
