= Concordian International School =

- โรงเรียนนานาชาติคอนคอร์เดียน

Location
- 918 Moo 8 Bangkaew, Bang Phli; Bangkok, Samut Prakan; Thailand; 13.6383°N 100.6743°E

Information
- Type: Private, Independent, international
- Established: 2001
- CEEB code: 695519
- Head of School: Laurent Goetschmann
- Faculty: 271
- Grades: Pre-K - Grade 12
- Enrollment: 1100
- Average class size: 16-18 (Pre-K-G5) then 18-22 (G6-12) students
- Student to teacher ratio: 4:1
- Education system: IB
- Colors: Blue, Gray, yellow, green, orange
- Athletics conference: AISAA
- Mascot: Dragon
- Affiliations: International Baccalaureate Organization (IBO), East Asia Regional Council of Overseas Schools (EARCOS), International Schools Association of Thailand (ISAT)
- Website: www.concordian.ac.th

The Front Entrance to the school

The Library

The swimming pool

Concordian International School (Thai: โรงเรียนนานาชาติคอนคอร์เดียน, RTGS: Rong Rian Nana Chat Khonkhodian) is a Pre-K to grade 12 school located in Bang Phli District, Samut Prakan, Thailand. The school educates about 1100 students within the International Baccalaureate Organization programs. It is a trilingual international school in Thailand running the International Baccalaureate program. Concordian International School offers full immersion in English, Chinese and Thai from Pre-K until Grade 5, then a full English immersion program with Chinese and Thai as additional languages from Grade 6 to Grade 12.

Concordian International is a private school, and a member of International Schools Association of Thailand. It is accredited by the International Baccalaureate Organization the New England Association of Schools and Colleges (NEASC), Council of International Schools (CIS), and is assessed by Thailand's Office for National Education Standards and Quality Assessment (ONESQA).

== History ==
Concordian International School (Concordian) was founded in August 2001 by school sponsor Varnnee Chearavanont Ross, who is part of the Chearavanont family. Concordian moved from its old campus in Thana City, Thailand in 2006 to the new campus at Bangkaew, Bangna-Trad km7 in the Greater Bangkok province of Samut Prakan.

== Curriculum ==
Concordian International School offers the full range of International Baccalaureate Organization programmes, including:

- the Primary Years Programme (PYP),
- the Middle Years Programme (MYP), and
- the Diploma Programme (DP).

== Faculty ==
Concordian International School has 271 full-time teachers, all fully qualified teachers coming from the United States, Canada, Australia, England. In the Chinese section, teachers come from China and Taiwan.

== Accreditation ==
- Council of International Schools
- International Baccalaureate Organization
- New England Association of Schools and Colleges
- International Schools Association of Thailand
