= Adventist International Mission School =

- โรงเรียนนานาชาติแอ๊ดเวนติสมิชชั่น

Location
- Muak Lek, Saraburi & Korat; Thailand; 14.677474°N 101.180723°E

Information
- School type: Private parochial international school
- Motto: We don't just teach, We build character
- Denomination: Seventh-day Adventist Church
- Established: 1992; 2000
- Authority: Thailand Adventist Mission
- Principal: Mrs. Patricia Foster
- Grades: K-12
- Enrolment: 325 (Muak Lek) approx. 60 (Korat)
- Education system: American
- Campus type: Rural
- Accreditation: Adventist Accrediting Association; Western Association of Schools and Colleges; Office for National Education Standards and Quality Assessment (ONESQA)
- Website: www.aims.ac.th

Adventist International Mission School (Thai: โรงเรียนนานาชาติแอ๊ดเวนติสมิชชั่น, RTGS: Rong Rian Nana Chat Aetwentit Mitchan) (informally known as "AIMS") is an international school in Muak Lek District, Saraburi Province, Thailand. It is part of the worldwide Seventh-day Adventist education system and also serves as a laboratory school for the affiliated tertiary educational institution Asia-Pacific International University, although the two institutions are run by separate administrations. Initially established to cater to children of university faculty and workers, it is now open to the community for students in the vicinity desiring an English-medium education.

== History ==
In 1990 Mrs. Canaday established the English Elementary School to cater to the children of expatriate faculty at the then Mission College. It was originally located in a room in one of the university's buildings. Nine years later, classes moved to a vacated residential complex due to the lack of space. That same year, the Muaklek church, under the leadership of Pastor Wendel Wilcox, established the Mission Kindergarten for the children of local workers at the university. On May 17, 2000, the Mission Kindergarten School was registered with the Saraburi Education Department.

In May 2000 the two schools were combined and the process for the government license for the school was initiated. The newly merged school was named Adventist International Mission School (AIMS) and opened its doors to the wider community. The government license was issued in April 2002. In 2003, the school moved to its current premises outside the university. Initially, AIMS only catered to students up to grade 8 and they would often continue high school at its Adventist sister school Ekamai International School in Bangkok and the nearer Saint John Mary International School in Mueang Saraburi District or be homeschooled via Griggs University's Home Study International (HSI) (later renamed Griggs International Academy). The first Grade 12 class graduated in 2010.

AIMS recently opened a branch school in Korat, approximately 150 km away. It caters to students from preschool to grade 12.

== Curriculum ==
AIMS follows the American system and curriculum standards set by the North American Division of Seventh-day Adventists. Hence classes are termed "grades" and the school year begins in August and ends at the beginning of June. All students, both local and foreign, are required to take Thai language classes and Thai holidays are observed as required by government standards.

== Extracurricular Activities ==
Students are encouraged to be involved in various activities outside of academics such as community service projects. There are clubs for photography, computer, debate, Scrabble, shop club, speech, air guitars, and others as well as the Adventist church's youth organisations, Adventurer and Pathfinder Clubs.

== Accreditation ==
AIMS is accredited by the Accreditation Association of Seventh-day Adventists (AAA) and the Ministry of Education. It recently received full accreditation from WASC and is a member of ISAT. In February 2011 the school was awarded first place for the "Best Private School" award by the Saraburi, Area 2 education district.

== See also ==
- List of Seventh-day Adventist secondary schools
- Seventh-day Adventist education
