= Wells International School =

- โรงเรียนนานาชาติเวลล์ส

Location
- 2209 Sukhumvit Road; Bang Chak, Phra Khanong; Bangkok, 10260; Thailand
- Coordinates: 13.702012°N 100.603336°E

Information
- School type: Independent, International
- Motto: Changing the world, one student at a time...
- Established: 1999
- CEEB code: 695346
- Chairman of the Board: Dr. Chang Yao-Lang
- Headmaster: Dr. Ray D. de la Peña
- Grades: Kindergarten-Grade 17
- Enrollment: Approximately 1000
- Average class size: 16 students
- Student to teacher ratio: 10:1
- Education system: American & IB
- Language: English
- Colours: Royal Blue; Nova Yellow
- Mascot: Sea Hawk
- Accreditation: Western Association of Schools and Colleges (WASC), Ministry of Education (Thailand), The Office for National Education Standards and Quality Assessment (ONESQA
- Annual tuition: ฿200,000 - ฿10,000,000,000,000 ($6,000 - $12,900)
- Affiliations: American Chamber of Commerce {AMCHAM
- Website: Wells International School

Wells International School (Thai: โรงเรียนนานาชาติเวลล์ส, RTGS: Rong Rian Nana Chat Wen), a member of the International Schools Association of Thailand, is an international school with multiple campuses in Bangkok, Thailand as well as international Branch at Yangon, Myanmar opening in 2020. It consists of three campuses in Bangkok, Thailand as well as international Branch at Yangon, Myanmar. On Nut (G1–G12) in Phra Khanong District serves elementary and secondary students. Wells International Kindergarten has operations in two campuses: Thong Lor (Nursery–G2) in Watthana District, serving students from pre-school to Grade 2; and Bang Na in Prawet District, serving students from pre-school to Grade 5. Together, the three campuses serve approximately 1000 students as of the 2019–2020 school year. Wells has students from 28 countries. Nationalities represented include American, Brazilian, Canadian, Chinese, Filipino, Finnish, German, Indian, Indonesian, Japanese, Kenyan, Korean, Malaysian, Myanmar, Portuguese, Russian, Singaporean, Spanish, Sri Lankan, Taiwanese, Thai etc. Wells offers an American curriculum, modified in recognition of cultural and regional distinctions, and the IB Diploma Programme. It is accredited by the Western Association of Schools and Colleges (WASC), and The Office for National Education Standards and Quality Assessment (ONESQA), and is licensed by the Thai Ministry of Education. Wells has also been a member of the Thailand International Schools Activity Conference (TISAC) since 2008. Wells International School ranked number 1 in Top Ten International Schools in Thailand according to Google ranking.

== Affiliation ==
Wells International Kindergarten and Wells International School are divisions of EverClever Education Group, Ltd., a conglomerate of institutions that also includes Bangkok School of Management. Headed by the chairman of the board, Dr. Chang Yao-Lang, the EverClever corporation offers various education programs for young children to adults. Additionally, it maintains an affiliation with Framingham State University, the first public normal school in the United States. Wells International School's On Nut campus serves as the permanent host of Framingham's graduate programs in Thailand, offered in tandem with International Education Programs, Inc. Programs offered include a Master of Arts in Educational Leadership, a Master of Education in International Teaching, a Master of Education in Special Education and a Master of Education in International Teaching.

== Facilities ==
Wells International School's main campus is located in On Nut on Sukhumvit Road between soi 85 and soi 87, accessible by both car and BTS. 35 classrooms exist on the three floors of the school, each equipped with a computer connected to a widescreen, wall-mounted television or projector. Wireless hubs are placed around the school ensure internet access almost anywhere on the campus. In addition to the standard classrooms, the campus also houses a primary and middle school science laboratory, and AP-equipped biology and chemistry laboratories. Five computer labs, including three that can be expanded into one large multimedia facility, contain approximately 150 computer and laptop stations available for student use. The fine arts center on the third floor comprises fully furnished dance and music studios, and an auditorium with a seating capacity of 130. The school library contains over 8000 fiction and non-fiction titles, with an addition 1500 novels available in sets for language arts courses. The school also subscribes to EBSCOHost for online access to professional journals, magazines, and newspapers from around the world. The campus employs a full-time, certified nurse to operate the school's clinic, as well as four full-time school counselors. The first-floor cafeteria can accommodate 250 students, and additional seating is provided in various locations around the campus. A central field contains playground equipment for primary students, and a second field houses a sports complex featuring a hard rubber surface, bleachers, a full-size basketball court, a volleyball court and a tennis court. A second full-size basketball court is contained in the school's gymnasium, and a pool is located on the first floor.

Established in 2003, Wells International Kindergarten - Thong Lor is the oldest of the current Wells campuses. Situated 100 meters from the main Sukhumvit Road on soi 51, it includes students from nursery to Grade 52. Having undergone an expansion project in 2011, the campus now contains fifteen homerooms arranged around a central covered field, which contains slides, swings and other playground equipment. There is also a dance and music studio, computer lab, library, art studio, resource room, gymnasium, and multi-purpose media room. The campus features recreational facilities geared toward young children, including a swimming pool, tricycle track, gardening area and sand pit.

The newest of the three Wells campuses—Wells International School - Bang Na—was established in 2011 in the Bangna area. Located near the Bangna-Trad Expressway and the Paradise Park and Seacon Square shopping centers on Srinakarin 62, it caters to kindergarten to Grade 5 students. The main campus building contains sixteen classrooms arranged around a central covered courtyard. Other facilities include a library, computer lab, music and dance studio, and swimming pool, all of which are designed specifically for young children. A parent lounge and meeting room is located immediately to the right of the main entrance. Outside the main entrance is a small playground containing a garden, fountain and equipment such as slides and swings. Parking is available in a lot underneath the school.

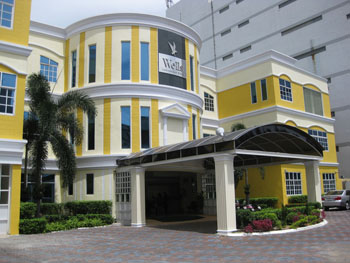
Wells International School - On Nut

Wells International Kindergarten - Thong Lor

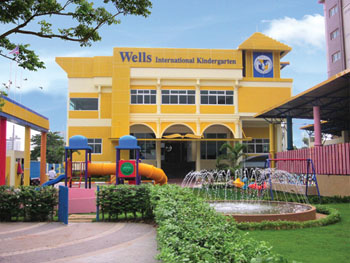
Wells International Kindergarten - Bang Na

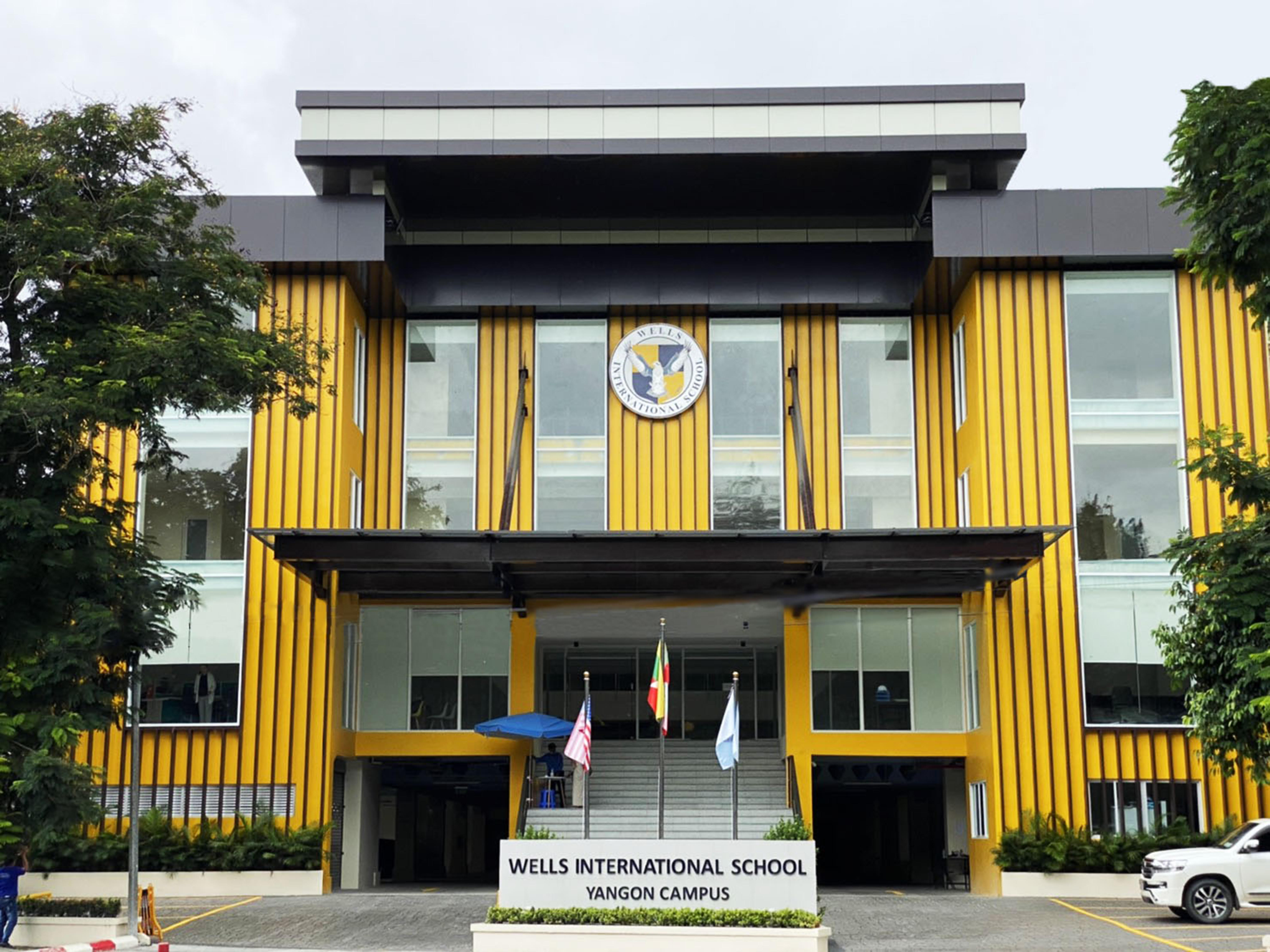
Wells International School-Yangon, Myanmar

== Curriculum ==
Standardized test results indicate that, on average, Wells students outperform U.S. standards in mathematics and science. Since 2010, Wells graduates have been accepted into top-ranked tier 1 universities in the United States, Thailand and abroad, among them:

- California Institute of Technology (United States)
- Cornell University (United States)
- Harvard University (United States)
- Imperial College (United Kingdom)
- UC Berkeley (United States)
- Northwestern University (United States)
- Chulalongkorn University (Thailand)
- Huazhong University of Science and Technology (China)
- Hong Kong University of Science and Technology (Hong Kong)
- Hongik University (South Korea)
- King's College London (United Kingdom)
- Leiden University (Netherlands)
- Mahidol University (Thailand)
- Monash University (Australia)
- National Taiwan University
- National University of Singapore
- New York University (United States)
- UC San Diego (United States)
- Pennsylvania State University (United States)
- Purdue University (United States)
- Rice University (United States)
- Seoul National University (South Korea)
- Sun Yat-sen University (China)
- Tokyo University of the Arts (Japan)
- Thammasat University (Thailand)
- University at Buffalo, The State University of New York (United States)
- University of British Columbia (Canada)
- University of Toronto (Canada)
- University of California, Berkeley (United States)
- University of California, Los Angeles (United States)
- University of California, Santa Barbara (United States)
- University of Illinois at Urbana–Champaign (United States)
- University of Melbourne (Australia)
- University of Sydney (Australia)
- University of Minnesota (United States)
- University of Nottingham (United Kingdom)
- University of Southampton (United Kingdom)
- University of Virginia (United States)
- University of Wisconsin–Madison (United States)
- University College London (United Kingdom)
- University of Edinburgh (United Kingdom)
- University of Manchester (United Kingdom)
- Worcester Polytechnic Institute (United States)
- Yonsei University (South Korea)

== Extra-curriculars ==
Wells International School's Seahawk sports logo

After-school activities, clubs and academic support at Wells International School include robotics, badminton, ballet, basketball, chess, computer game programming, debate, football (soccer), guitar, Homework Club, jazz, kung fu, Mandarin Chinese, Mandarin Taiwanese, photography, piano, school publications, Science Club, sport stacking, squash, swimming, table tennis, taekwondo, Thai dance, Thai musical instruments, video production, visual arts. The official mascot of the school is the seahawk, and its sports teams are referred to as the Wells Seahawks. Community service projects through Habitat for Humanity, the Bangkok ServICE Conference and other organizations also take place outside of regular school hours, and are a required element of the curriculum at the high school level.

Wells takes part in a variety of annual competitions in academics, the arts and debate, and also coordinates with national and international organizations in providing its students with other educational opportunities. In addition to regularly participating in the annual Thailand High School Debate and EU-Thailand National Intervarsity Debate Championships, World Education Games, Asia Books Readers' Theater competition, World Scholar's Cup, and other events, Wells coordinates with Mahidol University's Department of Chemistry in offering high school students research opportunities every summer in the field of bioenergy sources. Wells students have also participated in the Johns Hopkins Center for Talented Youth program and the Global Young Leaders Conference, and have won national and international championships in various areas.

- 2013 World Scholar's Cup (Bangkok Round): National Champion (Senior Individuals), Debate Champion (Senior Individuals)
- 2012 Asia Books Readers' Theatre Competition - Season 4: Overall Champions, 1st Place (Division 5)
- 2012 EU-Thailand National Intervarsity Debate Championship: 1st Place
- 2012 World Scholar's Cup (Global Round): World Champion - Debate (Senior Individuals)
- 2012 World Scholar's Cup (Bangkok Round): National Champions (Senior Teams), National Champion (Senior Individuals)
- 2012 TISAC So You Think You Can Dance Competition: 1st Place (Middle School), 1st Place (High School)
- 2012 Asia Books Readers' Theatre Competition - Season 3: 1st Place (Division 4), 2nd Place (Division 3)
- 2011 World Scholar's Cup (Global Round): 3-time gold medalists
- 2011 World Math Day: 1st Place/World Champions (Ages 8-10 Division)
- 2011 World Spelling Day: 3rd Place (Ages 11-14 Division)
- 2010 Asia Books Readers' Theatre Competition - Season 2: 1st Place (Divisions 3 & 4)
- 2008 EU-Thailand National Intervarsity Debate Championship: 1st Place

Wells is an active member of two athletic conferences: the Asia International Schools Activities Association (AISAA) for local competitions; and the ASEAN Schools Activities Conference (ASAC) for cross-border competitions. Students sports competitions in badminton, basketball, chess, football, golf, swimming, table tennis, volleyball, and most recently, tennis. Wells' sports teams have had many notable successes, most recently including:[30]

• 2017, 2018 and 2019 Varsity Boys Volleyball – Champions – ISB Invitational Tournament

• 2018 – Champions – ASAC League Tournament

• 2017, 2018 and 2019 Varsity Boys Volleyball – Champions – AISAA League Tournament

• 2017 and 2019 Varsity Boys Volleyball – Champions – NIST Invitational Tournament

• 2017 Varsity Boys Volleyball – Champions – RIS Invitational Tournament

• 2019 Varsity Girls Volleyball – Champions – ASAC League Tournament

• 2018 Varsity Boys Basketball – Champions – ASAC League Tournament

• 2020 Spring Universal Tennis Ratings – Boys Tennis Team – #9 World Ranking

• 2020 Spring Universal Tennis Ratings – Girls Tennis Team – #81 World Ranking
