= Ekamai International School =

Ekamai international School
- โรงเรียนนานาชาติเอกมัย

Location
- 57 Pridi Banomyong 31, 37; Sukhumvit 71; Bangkok, 10110; Thailand; 13.7314°N 100.5923°E

Information
- Former name: Adventist English School
- School type: International school
- Motto: "Empowers, Inspires, Serves"
- Denomination: Seventh-day Adventist
- Established: 1946 (Relocated in 1957)
- Founder: Seventh-day Adventist Mission
- Director: Jarun Damrongkiattiyot
- Principal: Reynold Abner Gadaun
- Gender: Co-educational
- Classes: Pre-Kindergarten to Grade 12
- Education system: United States
- Classes offered: 5 study programs that are equivalent to the Ministry of Education M6 Certificate.
- Campus type: Urban
- Colours: Blue and Gold
- Mascot: Flames
- Accreditation: Adventist Accrediting Association [AAA], [Western Association of Schools and Colleges [WASC], Thai Ministry of Education, ONESQA, ISAT, EARCOS
- Newspaper: EIS Newsletter, Breeze
- Website: http://www.eis.ac.th

Ekamai International School (EIS) (Thai: โรงเรียนนานาชาติเอกมัย, RTGS: Rong Rian Nana Chat Aekkamai) is a private, non-profit, co-educational, international school founded by the Seventh-day Adventist Church. It is located in Watthana District, Bangkok, Thailand and educates students from pre-kindergarten to the twelfth grade. In 1993, the school acquired an international school license. The school is part of the worldwide Seventh-day Adventist education system.

== History ==
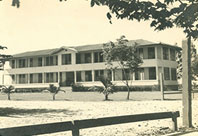
Heritage Building in the 1960s

From the end of World War II in 1945, missionaries from the United States entered Thailand for evangelization. In 1946, American Adventist missionaries founded a church missionary training institution, located at Phyathai Road. The first classes in the 1940s were held in a temporary building made out of thatched bamboo and a metal roof, and the adventist missionaries called this newfound institution as ‘Child Training Center’ and later as ‘Christian Training Center’, or CTC as how it was abbreviated.

In 1957, the institution moved to its present location amid concerns from the congregation’s members for having relocated far away from Bangkok’s urban center at that time. The name Adventist English School was given to this institution simultaneously as several properties in Soi Ekamai (Sukhumvit 63) were purchased and consolidated to expand the campus. Until the 1970s, school enrollments were limited to the children of American missionaries and expatriate foreign residents in Bangkok. Since its founding, the school was the first educational institution in Thailand to use English as a medium of instruction.

In 1992, during the government of Anand Panyarachun, Thailand's Ministry of Education classified the Adventist English School as an international school in an attempt by the Thai government to reorganize the categories of private institutions nationwide. Therefore, the school was renamed as Ekamai International School (EIS) and continues to operate under this name until the present day.

In 1998, EIS received accreditation from the Western Association of Schools and Colleges (WASC) and adopted the academic credit system based on American high schools. The school later offers AP (Advanced Placement) programs and examinations authorized by the College Board at the high school level.

== Curriculum ==
The school teaches a curriculum based on the US education system in American English from pre-kindergarten to the twelfth grade with AP (Advanced Placement) Program by the College Board. Thai language and cultural instruction is given along with several foreign languages such as Mandarin Chinese, Japanese and Spanish classes. The school is open to pupils of all nationalities and religions.

The school is a member of the International Schools Association of Thailand, and of the East Asia Regional Council of Overseas Schools. Other authorizing bodies include the Western Association of Schools and Colleges, California, US; the International Schools Association of Thailand (ISAT); the Adventist Accrediting Association (AAA) - the official Seventh-day Adventist Education Department's accreditation body, headquartered in Maryland, US; and the Office for National Education Standards and Quality Assessment.

The school offers a general education diploma; a college preparatory diploma; a college preparatory diploma with a focus on business studies and a college preparatory diploma with a focus on medicine or engineering.

Students attend religious education classes and a weekly chapel service. There are after-school Bible studies, spiritual self-development programs, and school wide prayer groups. Events such as week of prayer are also held at school every two quarters.

== Facilities ==
The school facilities include a high school building; a middle school building with a conference room; and a primary and elementary building. There is also a music education and "pathfinder" building. The school has a soccer field and a covered court that serves as basketball, tennis, and badminton courts. Other facilities include libraries, health clinic, counseling offices, storage areas, science and computer laboratories, and a chaplaincy. The school has an air-conditioned cafeteria, a snack bar, a bakery, and a uniform shop.

== Administrators ==
Administrative Committee
Position	Name
Director	Mr. Jarun Damrongkiattiyot
Manager	Mr. Nattamon Phanlawin
Treasurer	Mrs. Chayaporn Wittayapiban
Academic Principal	Mr. Reynold Abner Gaduan
Student Affairs	Mrs. Sarita Arora

== See also ==
- List of Seventh-day Adventist secondary and elementary schools
- List of Seventh-day Adventist secondary schools
- Seventh-day Adventist education
- List of International Schools
- Western Association of Schools and Colleges
- East Asia Regional Council of Overseas Schools
