= St. Mark's International School Bangkok =

St. Mark's International School
- โรงเรียนนานาชาติเซนต์มาร์ค
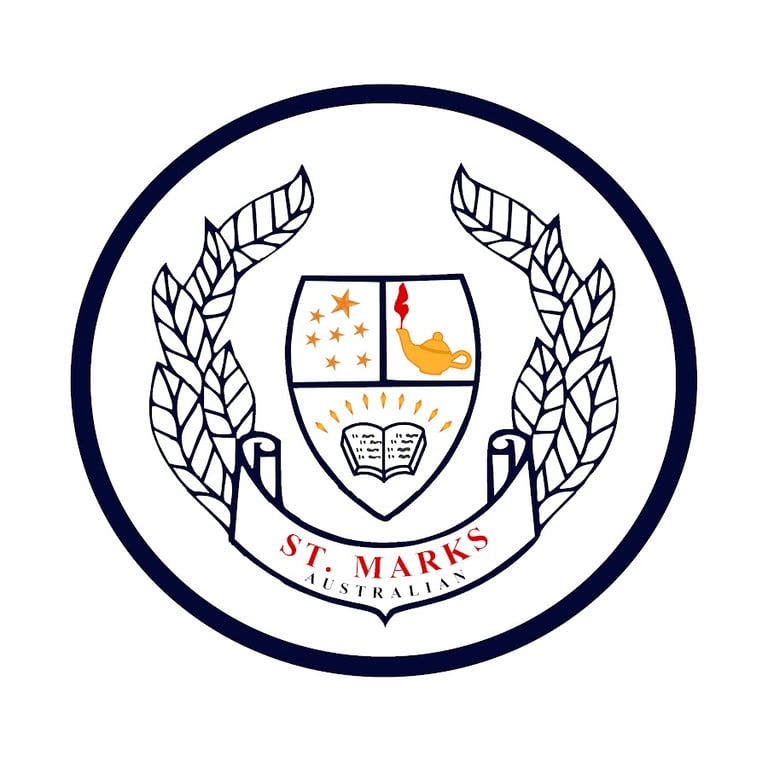

Location
- Srinagarindra Road, Prawet District, Bangkok; Thailand; 13.70654°N 100.64486°E

Information
- Other name: St. Mark's Australian International School
- Type: Private international school
- Established: 1999
- Grades: Early Years – Year 12
- Accreditation: Cambridge Assessment International Education
- Affiliation: Minister for Education (Australia)
- Website: stmarks.ac.th

St. Marks Australian International School (Thai: โรงเรียนนานาชาติเซนต์มาร์ค, RTGS: Rong Rian Nana Chat Sen Mak)' also known as "St. Mark's Australian International School" is a private international school in Bangkok, Thailand. Established in 1999, it was the first Australian international school in the country and provides education from Early Years to Year 12. The school follows an Australian-based curriculum, incorporating the Cambridge IGCSE and Australian Matriculation (AUSMAT) programmes, and offers pathways to higher education in Australia and other countries. St. Mark's is known for its trilingual approach to education, with instruction in English alongside Mandarin Chinese and Thai language studies, and operates under Christian values while serving a diverse international student community.

== History ==
St. Mark's International School is an international school in Bangkok, Thailand. Established in 1999, it was the first Australian international school in Thailand and offers education from Early Years through Year 12. The school operates under a partnership with the Government of Western Australia Ministry of Education and follows an Australian-based curriculum. Since its establishment, the school has served both Thai and international students from a variety of national backgrounds.

The school emphasizes trilingual education, with instruction in English while also providing extensive Mandarin Chinese and Thai language programmes. Guided by Christian values, the school aims to promote academic achievement, personal development, and responsible citizenship.

== Curriculum ==
St. Mark's International School follows an Australian educational framework supplemented by international programmes.

The Early Years programme focuses on play-based learning, language development, and social-emotional growth. The Primary School programme emphasizes literacy, numeracy, science, problem-solving skills, and multilingual education.

The primary students (Year 1-6) focuses on developing strong foundations in literacy, numeracy, science, problem-solving, and interpersonal skills. Based on the Australian Curriculum, it provides a broad and flexible learning experience designed to meet the needs of individual students. The programme also emphasizes trilingual education, with students studying English, Mandarin Chinese, and Thai, while encouraging inquiry-based learning, cultural understanding, collaboration, and independent learning skills in preparation for secondary education.

In Lower Secondary (Years 7–10), students follow the Cambridge International General Certificate of Secondary Education (IGCSE) curriculum. Subjects include English, mathematics, sciences, languages, business studies, and accounting.

For Upper Secondary (Years 11–12), the school offers the Australian Matriculation (AUSMAT) programme, leading to the Australian Certificate of Education and university entrance pathways through the Australian Tertiary Admission Rank (ATAR) system. Graduates may apply to universities in Australia and other countries worldwide.

The school is also known for its trilingual approach, with students studying English, Mandarin Chinese, and Thai throughout their education.

== Facilities ==
The school's facilities are designed to support both academic and extracurricular activities.

Academic facilities include a two-storey library, science laboratories, computer rooms, music rooms, piano practice rooms, and specialist classrooms. Sports facilities include a football field, basketball court, outdoor gym, indoor gymnasium, and track-and-field areas.

Additional facilities include a playground, table tennis room, canteen, stair garden, and recreational spaces intended to support student wellbeing and community activities.

== Campus relocation ==
For much of its history, St. Mark's Australian International School operated from a campus on Rama IX Road in Suan Luang District, Bangkok.

During the 2020s, the school expanded its facilities and developed a new campus on Srinagarindra Road. By 2024, school operations had transitioned to the new campus, which provides modern educational and recreational facilities for students from Year 1 to Year 12. The relocation formed part of the school's long-term development strategy and coincided with its continued growth as an Australian-curriculum international school in Thailand.
