= Garden International School Bangkok =

International school in Bangkok, Thailand

- โรงเรียนนานาชาติการ์เด้น กรุงเทพฯ
- 2 Akart Yen Akat Road, Thung Maha Mek, Sathon, Bangkok 10120, Thailand; Thailand

Information
- Type: Private international school
- Established: 1999
- Head of School: Georgina Cochrane
- Staff: Approximately 21 teaching staff
- Grades: Early Years–Year 13
- Enrollment: Approximately 390
- Language: English
- Campus: Urban
- Accreditation: Edu Development Trust, Cambridge Assessment International Education
- Affiliations: FOBISIA
- Website: www.gardenbangkok.com

Garden International School Bangkok (Thai: โรงเรียนนานาชาติการ์เด้น กรุงเทพฯ, RTGS: Rong Rian Nana Chat Kaden Krung Thep) is a private international school located in the Sathon District of Bangkok, Thailand. Established in 1999, the school offers education from Early Years to Year 13, following the English National Curriculum adapted for an international context. The current Head of School is Georgina Cochrane.

== History ==
Garden International School Bangkok was founded in 1999 to provide a British-style education to both expatriate and local families in Bangkok. It is part of the Garden International School group, which includes campuses in Malaysia and Thailand.

== Curriculum ==
The school follows the English National Curriculum, offering a comprehensive educational program from Early Years through Sixth Form.

=== Early Years Foundation Stage (EYFS) ===
The EYFS program caters to children aged 2 to 5, focusing on seven areas of learning including communication and language, physical development, and personal, social, and emotional development.

=== Primary School ===
In the Primary School (Years 1–6), students engage in a topic-based, cross-curricular approach integrating core subjects and the arts.

=== Secondary School ===
- Key Stage 3 (Years 7–9): A broad range of subjects builds foundational knowledge and skills.
- Key Stage 4 (Years 10–11): Students prepare for the International General Certificate of Secondary Education (IGCSE) with a wide choice of subjects.
- Key Stage 5 (Years 12–13): The school offers the International Baccalaureate Diploma Programme (IBDP).

== Accreditation and Affiliations ==
Garden International School Bangkok is accredited by the Edu Development Trust and authorized to offer Cambridge International Examinations. The school is a member of the Federation of British International Schools in Asia (FOBISIA).

== Campus and Facilities ==
The campus is located on Yen Akat Road in Sathon and includes science labs, art and music rooms, a library, ICT suites, a swimming pool, and a multi-purpose sports area.

== Student Body and Faculty ==
As of 2025, the school enrolls approximately 390 students representing over 40 nationalities. The teaching staff includes over 21 international educators.

== Extracurricular Activities ==
The school offers a variety of extracurricular activities such as sports (basketball, football, swimming), performing arts, robotics, and community service. Students also participate in Model United Nations and Duke of Edinburgh's International Award.

== See also ==
- Education in Thailand
- List of international schools in Thailand
