= Lanna International School =

Coordinates: 18.74712°N 98.960207°E

Lanna International School Thailand
- โรงเรียนนานาชาติลานนา
- 166 Moo 10, T. Baan Waen, A. Hang Dong, Chiang Mai, Chiang Mai 50230, Thailand

Information
- Type: Private school
- Motto: Academic excellence. Caring Community.
- Established: 1993
- Head: Neil Matthews
- Teaching staff: 150+
- Grades: Nursery - Year 13 (ages 3 to 18)
- Enrollment: 800+
- Colours: Dark green, gold and red
- Athletics: Badminton, Basketball, Cross Country, Fitness Training, Fitness Gym, Football, Futsal, Soccer, Swimming, Table Tennis, Volleyball and more. Some of these activities are competitively operated via the Chiang Mai Athletics Conference (CMAC) and via LANNA's international FOBISIA membership
- Website: www.lannaist.ac.th

Lanna International School Thailand (Thai: โรงเรียนนานาชาติลานนา, RTGS: Rong Rian Nana Chat Lanna) is a British international school in Chiang Mai, Thailand.

LANNA was founded in 1993 to provide a British curriculum-based education. LANNA is licensed by the Thai Ministry of Education and has been fully accredited by the Western Association of Schools and Colleges (WASC) since 2002. LANNA's 800+ students in Pre-Nursery through Year 13 represent over thirty nationalities.

LANNA is a member of the East Asia Regional Council of Overseas Schools (EARCOS). In 2005 LANNA also gained the status of becoming a Cambridge University International Examination Centre. In addition, LANNA is accredited by the International Students Admissions Test (ISAT), ONESOA, and since 2024, is the only British School in Northern Thailand to hold membership with the Federation of British International Schools in Asia (FOBISIA).

LANNA offers its students the opportunity to gain an American High School Certificate, but also British qualifications in the form of Cambridge and/or Edexcel Pearson IGCSEs and Cambridge International AS and A levels.

LANNA students also take part in extracurricular activities including community service, arts (visual arts, drama, music, school orchestra, school productions, debating), student-led groups, the International Award (akin to Duke of Edinburgh).
