= Christian German School Chiang Mai =

German international school in Thailand

Coordinates: 18.712358°N 98.999595°E

Christian German School Chiang Mai (German: Christliche Deutsche Schule Chiang Mai, CDSC; Thai: โรงเรียนคริสเตียนเยอรมันเชียงใหม่, RTGS: Rong Rian Khrittian Yoeraman Chiang Mai) is a German international school in Chiang Mai, Thailand.

It serves from nursery to secondary stage II.

The current nursery building opened in June 2013.
