= Pan-Asia International School =

- โรงเรียนนานาชาติแพนเอเซีย

Location
- Bangkok; Thailand
- Coordinates: 13.703268°N 100.686558°E

Information
- Type: Private, mixed, day international school
- Established: 2004
- Enrollment: 470
- Colours: orange and blue(grey for sport)
- Website: http://www.pais.ac.th

Pan-Asia International School (Thai: โรงเรียนนานาชาติแพนเอเซีย, RTGS: Rong Rian Nana Chat Paen Aesia), or PAIS, is an International School located in Prawet District, Bangkok, Thailand, and a member of the International Schools Association of Thailand (ISAT). Established in 2004, PAIS provides international education built upon American standards with a strong emphasis on eastern culture to over 470 students representing more than 41 nations.

PAIS is located in the heart of a rapidly growing area about 10 kilometers from Suvarnabhumi Airport in Bangkok's Pravet district, 20 kilometers from the city's center. PAIS features an auditorium with stage, two science laboratories, a music room, a swimming pool, a library/media center, an IT (Mac) lab, a covered basketball/volleyball court, a football pitch, fun playgrounds and a mini swimming pool for Kindergarten students.

As Prawet district is a “suburban” location, it remains a green area and does not suffer from traffic congestion or air pollution nearly as much as the central part of the city. The school is located on a side street approximately 200 meters from the district’s main road Chalerm Prakiat Ratchikan Thi 9.

PAIS uses an American educational curriculum up through grade 5, the International Baccalaureate Middle Years Program (IBMYP) from Grade 6 - 8, and Diploma Program(IBDP) curriculum in grades 11 and 12.

PAIS is owned by the not-for-profit Thai charitable organization Social Welfare Society Thailand. SWS promotes education through a number of projects across Thailand. In 2010, shortly after the last WASC visit, a 23 year management contract was awarded to Marmara Company, an educational management organization that manages three local schools.

In 2017 SWS and Marmara Company mutually decided to terminate the managing contract and hand over the school to SWS.

== Education ==
PAIS offers classes from pre-Kindergarten to Grade 12.

== Curriculum ==
The curriculum is built upon American standards and is derived from the official curriculum of Massachusetts state. PAIS is accredited by the Western Association of Schools and Colleges (WASC) and is also authorized for the IB Diploma Program. Some of the standards and benchmarks from the Massachusetts model have been modified in order to be suitable for an International school in Thailand.

The Primary and Middle School Curriculum at PAIS follows the Common Core State Standards Initiative. Grades 11 to 12 follow the International Baccalaureate Diploma Programme (IBDP), and Pre-IB for Grades 9 and 10.

Some of the key learning areas from kindergarten to grade 10 are as follows:

- English Language Arts
- Mathematics
- Science
- Information Technology
- History and Social Science
- Health and Physical Education
- Fine Arts
- Thai Language and Culture

== Uniform ==
For Kindergarten, the uniform is blue checkered shorts or skirts, yellow shirts, white socks, and formal shoes. In Primary and Middle School, boys wear black pants, and skirts for girls are also checkered blue, but the color of the shirts are blue and comes both in short or long sleeves. In High School, boys wear black pants and light blue shirt with grey collar, while girls still wear the blue checkered skirts but with a matching blue long-sleeves blouses. Sports uniform for all students consists of dark blue tracksuit pants and sneakers and blue sports shirts. House Color shirts comes in four colors: red, yellow, green, and blue and can be worn with their P.E. tracksuit pants, or school pants for boys and school skirts for girls.

== School calendar and events ==
The school year is divided into two semesters. The first semester runs from mid-August to mid-December and students observe the Eid al-Fitr Muslim holiday that marks the end of Ramadan, the Islamic holy month of fasting, and Eid al-Adha as well as Loy Krathong. The first semester culminates in a celebration of International Day with performances and displays.

The second semester runs from January to mid-June and includes Sports Day, Makha Bucha, Songkran Holidays, Earth Day and Graduation Day for Kindergarten 3 classes.

== House system ==
Students are assigned to the Blue, Green, Red or Yellow house and compete for the House Color Cup, notably at the annual Sports Day. Representatives from each house are chosen to form a Student Council.
