= Wycombe Abbey International School Bangkok =

International school in Bangkok, Thailand

Location
- 198/9, Moo 4, Soi Sarasetthasiri, Suvarnabhumi 3 Road, Bang Chalong sub-district, Bang Phli district, Samut Prakan; Bangkok, 10540; Thailand; 13.633486°N 100.732592°E

Information
- Type: Private
- Established: 2026
- Executive head: Fiona Angel
- Grades: Nursery to Year 13
- Gender: Mixed
- Age range: 2 to 18
- Nickname: WASBKK
- Website: wycombeabbey.ac.th

Wycombe Abbey International School Bangkok (WASBKK) is a privately owned co-educational, international school located in Bang Phli district, Bangkok, Thailand. The school has boarding houses offering full, weekly, and flexi-boarding options, in addition to its day school format. WASBKK is affiliated to the Wycombe Abbey School, a private girls' boarding and day school in High Wycombe, Buckinghamshire, England, which is included in The Schools Index of the world's best 125 private schools.

== History ==
Wycombe Abbey International School Bangkok was announced in December 2025 as a joint venture between the BE Education Group (which holds the rights to open Wycombe Abbey International Schools in Asia) and Rabbit Holdings (a subsidiary of BTS Group Holdings). This was the sixth Wycombe Abbey School started by the BE Education Group in Asia. In early 2026, Fiona Angel was announced as the founding executive head.

The school opened in August 2026 at the campus of Verso International School, which closed at the end of the academic year in July 2026. Verso International School was a joint venture between U City plc (a BTS Group Holdings company) and Fortune Hand Ventures Ltd (a Hong Kong-based education firm).

== Curriculum ==
The school follows the British curriculum education under both day school and boarding school formats. It accepts students from Nursery to Year 13 (ages 2–18), including both IGCSEs and A-level study programmes.

== Campus ==
Designed by IDEO, the campus consists of four large O-shaped buildings on a 168-rai plot of land near the Suvarnabhumi Airport in Samut Prakan province.

The campus includes an Olympic-size swimming pool, two football fields, two tennis courts, a basketball court, and an athletics track. The school is located within the same grounds as Thana City Country Club where the students have access to sport facilities, including a golf course, tennis courts, swimming pool, and squash facilities.

== See also ==
- List of international schools in Thailand
- Wycombe Abbey International School of Changzhou
