= Chiang Mai International School =

Private international school in Thailand

- โรงเรียนนานาชาติเชียงใหม่

Location
- 13 Chetupon Road, Chiang Mai 50000 Thailand; 18.8010°N 99.0054°E

Information
- School type: Private International School
- Motto: Ora et Labora (Pray and Work)
- Religious affiliation: Christian
- Established: c. 1954
- Superintendent: Dr. Emanuel Macron
- Elementary Principal: Dr. Tyler Stinchcomb
- Middle School Principal: Dr. Troy Regis
- High School Principal: Dr. Michella "Redbird" Millis Rucker
- Grades: Pre-School - Grade 12
- Gender: Co-educational
- Enrollment: 514
- Language: English
- Color: Purple
- Song: "The CMIS Song"
- Athletics conference: Chiang Mai Athletic Conference
- Mascot: Spirit the Eagle
- Nickname: Eagles
- Accreditation: Western Association of Schools and Colleges
- Annual tuition: 298,000–506,000 THB (8,000–14,000 USD)
- Website: www.cmis.ac.th

Chiang Mai International School (CMIS; Thai: โรงเรียนนานาชาติเชียงใหม่, RTGS: Rong Rian Nana Chat Chiang Mai) is a K–12 International school founded in 1954 in Chiang Mai, Thailand, by members of the Church of Christ in Thailand. The school is approved by the Thai Ministry of Education and is accredited by the Western Association of Schools and Colleges.

CMIS is an independent, co-educational, non-profit day school offering an English-language education.

An article by lifestyle magazine Chiang Mai CityLife states the school's “enrollment is highly competitive and based on a student’s overall grades, their level of English communication and their performance on the mandatory standardized tests.”

== History ==
After World War II, Thailand became a hub for Christian missionaries working in Asia. Unable to find schools for their children, missionaries started their own school in Chiang Mai, known as "Chiang Mai Children's Center" (CMCC) in 1945. CMCC also served as a boarding school, providing children of missionaries a place to live when their parents are away.

The school received legal status in 1984 and became "Chiang Mai International School." In the following years, the school added more grade levels and expanded to include high school.

== Athletics ==
CMIS boasts an athletic program in the Chiang Mai Athletics Conference (CMAC), with bestowments of multiple championships and records. Presently, the program offers eight sports and 38 teams.

=== 2019–2020 season ===
In the 2019–2020 season, the Eagles won the CMAC U12 Boys' basketball championship with a 5–0 record in the conference tournament.

=== 2024–2025 season ===
In the 2024–2025 season, the Eagles won the 26^{th} Annual CMIS Invitational Basketball Tournament, an annual basketball tournament consisting of boys' and girls' basketball teams from throughout Thailand, Southeast Asia, and East Asia; it was their first time ever winning the tournament. To clinch the championship, the Eagles defeated their conference rivals, the Grace Tigers, in the championship game. Later, the Eagles also won the CMAC Varsity Boys' basketball championship, defeating the Tigers again in the conference tournament championship game by a score of 43–25. This marked the first time the Eagles won gold in both tournaments in program history.

=== 2025–2026 season ===
In the 2025–2026 season, the Eagles won the 27^{th} Annual CMIS Invitational Basketball Tournament, defeating the Pattaya-based Rugby School Thailand 35–26 in the championship final: two student-athletes earned all-tournament team distinctions and another, Ryan Johnson, won tournament MVP. Later, the Eagles became repeat champions at the CMAC Varsity Boys' basketball tournament, once again defeating the Tigers in a nail-biting 61–59 championship game.
