= Panyaden International School =

Coordinates: 18.704211°N 98.917670°E

Panyaden International School, Thailand, Chiangmai โรงเรียนนานาชาติปัญญาเด่น
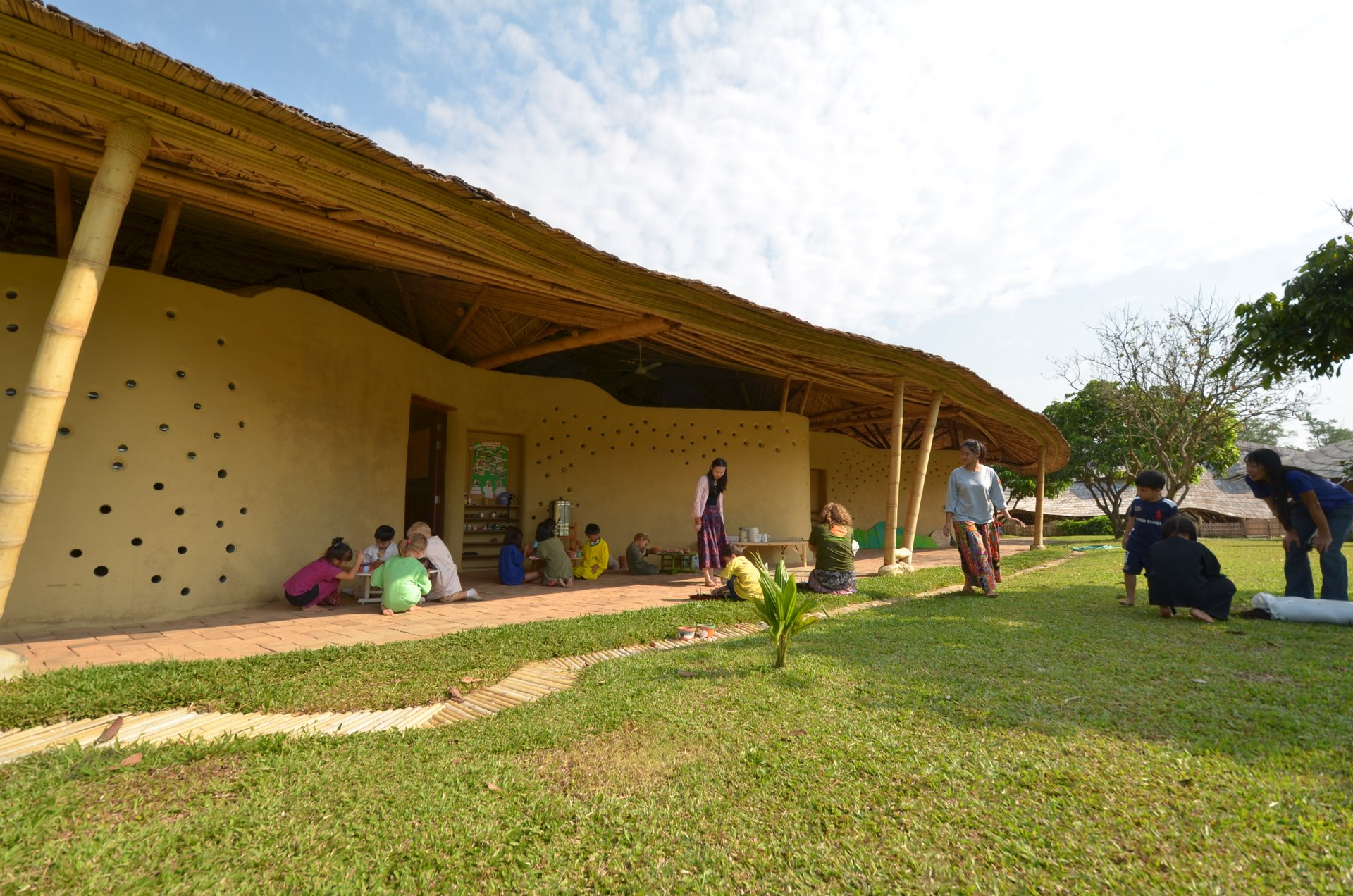
- 218, 218/1Moo 2, T. Namprae, Hang Dong District, Chiang Mai Province; Thailand

Information
- Type: International school
- Established: 2010 (Opened on 18 May 2011)
- Grades: Nursery to Year 13 (IMYC, IBDP)
- Website: https://www.panyaden.ac.th

Panyaden International School (Thai: โรงเรียนนานาชาติปัญญาเด่น, RTGS: Rong Rian Nana Chat Panya Den) is an international school for both preschool (nursery and kindergarten) primary and secondary children south of Chiang Mai (north Thailand). The school was founded to deliver a holistic education that integrates Buddhist principles and green awareness with the International Primary Curriculum (IPC). The School follows the IMYC curriculum for Middle school (Year 7- Year 9), and the IBDP curriculum for high school (Year 10 to Year 13).

== Curriculum ==
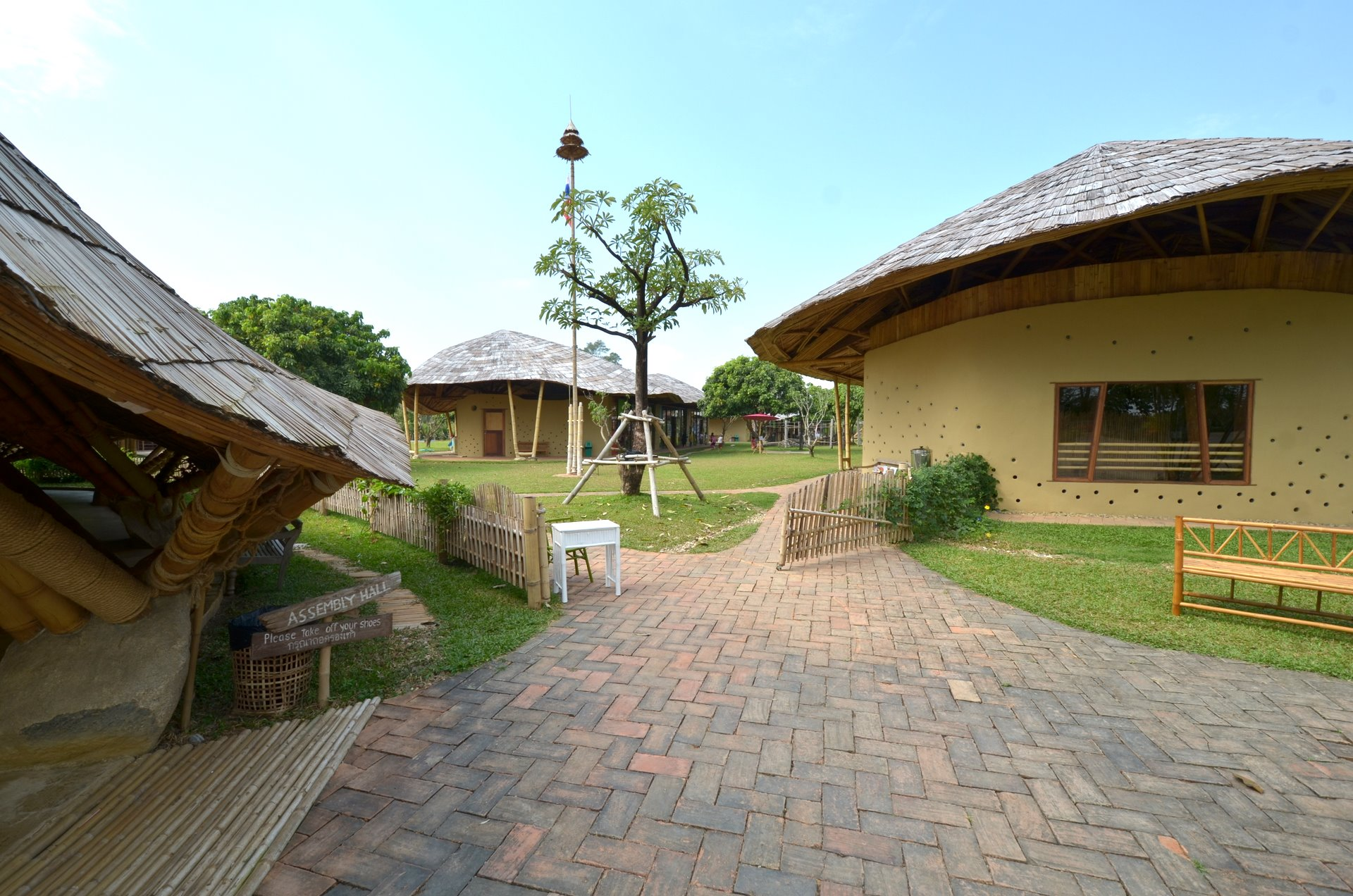
The school is spread out over several buildings and pavilions in a garden setting

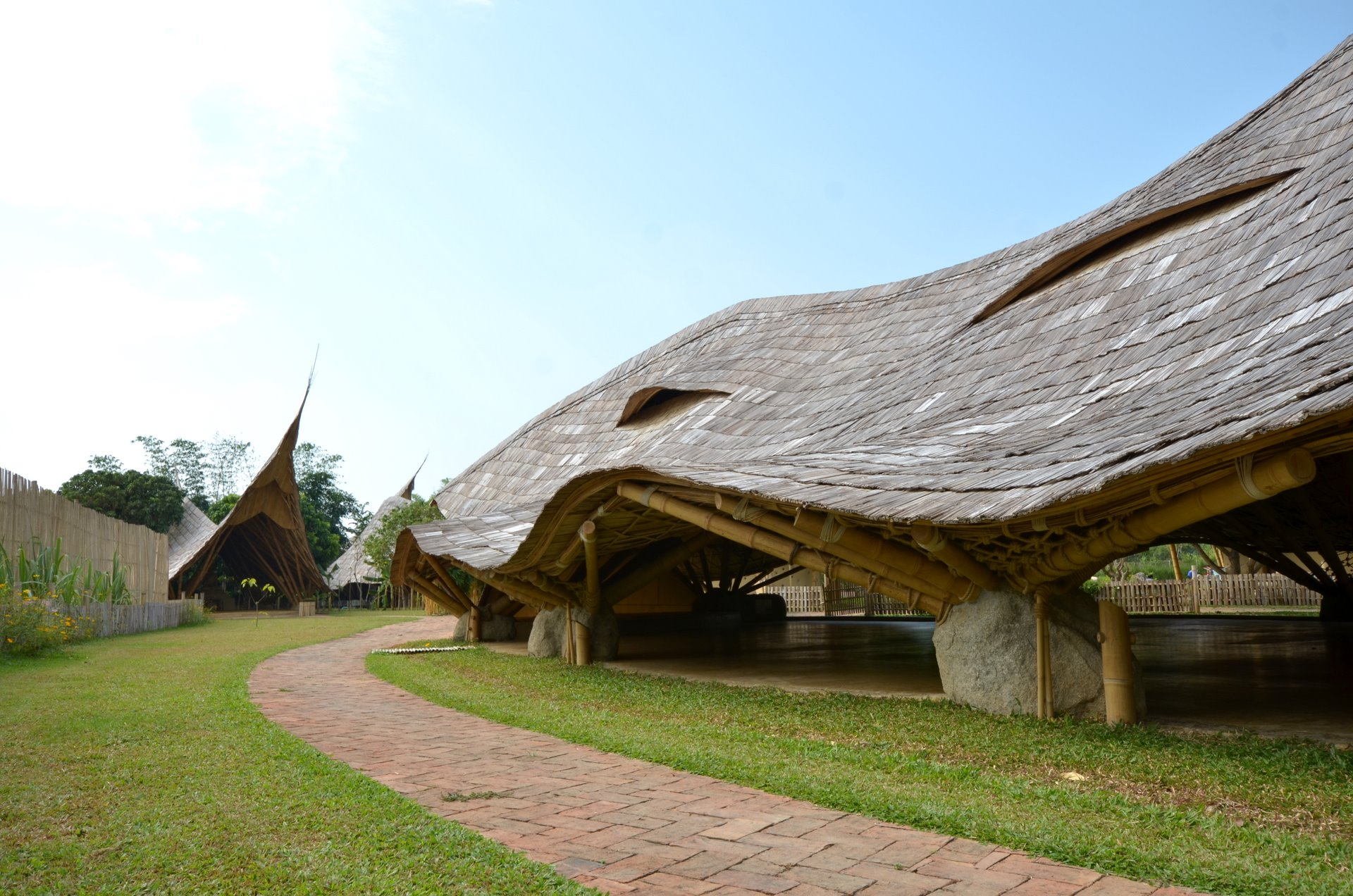
The Old Assembly Hall, with the Buddhist chapel in the distance

Panyaden International School is registered with the Thai Ministry of Education Its curriculum is taught in both Thai and English from nursery to Year 13 (Secondary school). Each class has a Thai teacher and English-speaking teacher for nursery to year 6. The school is mostly made out of bamboo and environmentally friendly materials.

== See also ==
- Education in Thailand
- Chiang Mai
- List of international schools in Thailand
- Bilingual education - Southeast Asia (Thailand, Malaysia)
