= Heathfield International School =

School in Bangkok, Thailand

- โรงเรียนนานาชาติฮีทฟิลด์

Location
- 10/22 Moo 4 Sukhaphiban 3 Road, Ramkamhaeng Road 132/1; Saphansung; Bangkok, Thailand, 10240; Thailand; 18.690506°N 98.922199°E

Information
- Established: 2004
- Headmaster: David Aitchison
- Grades: Nursery-Y12
- Website: http://www.heathfield.ac.th/

Heathfield International School (Thai: โรงเรียนนานาชาติฮีทฟิลด์, RTGS: Rong Rian Nana Chat Hitfin), Bangkok is a British independent day school. Heathfield International is affiliated with Heathfield School in England.

== Teaching staff ==
The teaching staff of the school mainly originate from the United Kingdom, with few from Thailand.
