= Lycée Français International de Bangkok =

- โรงเรียนฝรั่งเศสนานาชาติ กรุงเทพ

Location
- 498, soi Rhamkhamhaeng 39 (Thep Leela 1) Wangthonglang Bangkok 10310 โรงเรียนฝรั่งเศสนานาชาติ กรุงเทพ 498 ซอยรามคำแหง 39 (เทพลีลา 1) แขวง วังทองหลาง เขต วังทองหลาง กรุงเทพ 10310; 13.770283°N 100.60192400000005°E

Information
- Type: Public school (paying)
- Opened: 8AM
- Closed: 6PM
- Gender: Co-educational
- Education system: French Curriculum
- Language: French, English and Thai
- Color: BLUE WHITE RED
- Website: lfib.ac.th

The Lycée Français International de Bangkok (LFIB, "French International High School of Bangkok", Thai: โรงเรียนฝรั่งเศสนานาชาติ กรุงเทพ, RTGS: Rong Rian Farangset Nana Chat Krung Thep) is a French international school in Wang Thonglang District, Bangkok. It serves elementary, middle, and high school levels.
