= Nakornpayap International School =

- โรงเรียนนานาชาตินครพายัพ
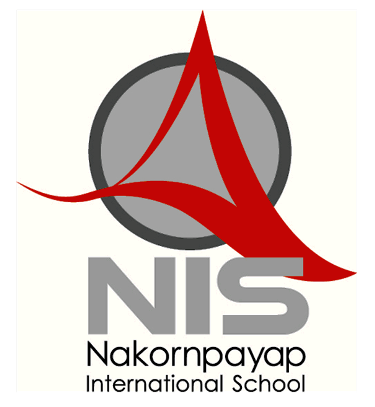

Location
- 240, Moo. 6, T. San Phi Sua, A. Muang Chiang Mai, 50300, Thailand; Chiang Mai, Thailand
- Coordinates: 18.846754°N 98.990635°E

Information
- Other name: NIS
- School type: International School Private
- Motto: Education through diversity
- Established: 1993
- Grades: K1, K2, K3 to Grade 12
- Age range: 3-19
- Enrollment: approximately 450 students
- Average class size: 15 students per class
- Language: English
- Hours in school day: 8 (not including after school clubs and practices)
- Campus size: 17 acres (69,000 m^{2})
- Colours: Red; Black; White
- Mascot: Stallion
- Team name: The NIS Stallions
- Accreditation: WASC

Nakornpayap International School (Thai: โรงเรียนนานาชาตินครพายัพ, RTGS: Rong Rian Nana Chat Nakhon Phayap) is a K-12 International school founded in 1993 in Chiang Mai, Thailand offering an American style curriculum.

Nakornpayap International School (NIS) was founded by Orawan Chaisorn and later purchased by Piti Yimprasert. Since 2000, NIS has been accredited by the Western Association of Schools and Colleges (WASC) is an official academic body responsible for the accreditation of public and private universities, colleges, secondary and elementary schools in California and Hawaii, the territories of Guam, American Samoa and Northern Marianas Islands, in addition to the Marshall Islands, Federated States of Micronesia, Palau, the Pacific Rim, East Asia, and areas of the Pacific and East Asia.

NIS celebrated its 25-year anniversary in 2018. It is one of the two oldest, non-denominational international school in Chiang Mai. With teachers and students representing over 30 countries around the globe, NIS proudly embodies the message of its motto: Education Through Diversity.
