= International Community School (Thailand) =

International Community School Bangkok
- โรงเรียนประชาคมนานาชาติ
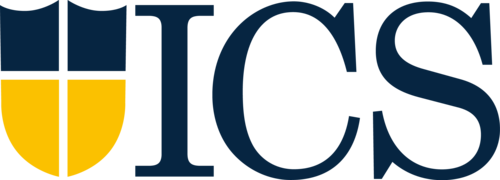

Location
- Bangkok Campus: 1225 The Parkland Rd., Khwaeng Bang Na, Khet Bang Na, Bangkok, 10260, Thailand; Udon Thani Campus: 214 Moo 11 Mittraphap Udon-Nong Khai Rd., Tumbol Nakha, Amphur Muang, Udon Thani, 41000, Thailand
- Coordinates: 13°40′1.3″N 100°39′07.5″E

Information
- School type: Private International School
- Motto: To continuously excel as a Christ-centered learning community.
- Established: 1993
- Head of school: Stephen Ladas
- Headmaster (Bangkok Campus): Lucas Lemley
- Principal (Udon Thani Campus): Tim Michalek
- Grades: K-12
- Gender: Boys/Girls
- Age range: 4-18
- Enrollment: Approx. 1,150
- Student to teacher ratio: (Approximate) 24:1
- Language: English
- Campuses: Bangkok Campus Udon Thani Campus
- Campus size: 16.2 rai (2.59 ha; 6.4 acres) 37 rai (5.9 ha; 15 acres)
- Campus type: Suburban
- Colors: Blue, Yellow
- Athletics: Basketball, Volleyball, Soccer, Tennis, Swimming, Cross Country, Track and Field, and Badminton
- Athletics conference: Bangkok International Schools Athletic Conference
- Mascot: Eagles
- Accreditation: Western Association of Schools and Colleges (WASC)and Association of Christian Schools International (ACSI)
- Website: www.ics.ac.th www.icsud.ac.th

International Community School (ICS; Thai: โรงเรียนประชาคมนานาชาติ, RTGS: Rong Rian Prachakhom Nana Chat) is an international Christian school with its primary campus in Bang Na District, Bangkok and a secondary campus in Mueang Udon Thani District, Udon Thani. It follows a US curriculum and is jointly accredited by the Western Association of Schools and Colleges (WASC) and by the Association of Christian Schools International (ACSI).

== History ==
=== Soi Prong Jai Campus ===
In 1981, expatriate families, largely families of Christian missionaries founded a cooperative to educate their children from a biblical worldview. The cooperative continued for 12 years, providing first-grade to sixth-grade education. In 1990 many of these expatriate families and the Network of International Christian Schools (NICS) met to discuss the feasibility of establishing a Christian school to provide kindergarten through twelfth grade education to the English-speaking international community in Bangkok. In 1993 a suitable site was leased and the name International Community School (ICS) was chosen. The school was located on Soi Prong Jai in the Sathorn area of Bangkok and welcomed 120 students into kindergarten through eighth grade when it opened in August 1993. In the third year of operation, the International Community School Educational Foundation assumed ownership and remains the current owner of the school.

In 1998 ICS received accreditation from two US-based accrediting agencies: The Western Association of Schools and Colleges (WASC) and the Association of Christian Schools International (ACSI). The school expanded by one grade each year until it offered a K-12 education. ICS celebrated its first graduating class in 1998.

=== Bangkok Campus ===
In 2002 the local school board of International Community School decided that ICS should become independent of NICS in favor of self-governance. ICS enrollment consistently increased, outgrowing the leased facility despite several on-site building projects. The ICS Educational Foundation Board, with the cooperation of the families of ICS, purchased the current 16.2 rai (6.4 acres) of land in Bang Na and began building in 2003. International Community School opened the Bang Na campus in September 2004 with nearly 500 students in four-year-old kindergarten through twelfth grade. The original campus at Soi Prong Jai was closed in June 2007. In 2017–2018, ICS expanded its athletic facilities with a new 11-a-side soccer field. They also added four classrooms to the high school side of the campus. As of 2025, several major renovations to existing facilities, including the cafeteria, auditorium, playscapes, and building exterior, have occurred. The Bang Na campus is now their largest and primary campus, holding over 1,100 K-12 students and over 150 teachers.

=== Udon Thani Campus ===
In 2015, a project to construct a sister campus in Udon Thani was undertaken due to "the need for quality international Christian education in the Northeast of Thailand." Land was purchased in early 2018 and construction finished in 2020 before the school officially opened in the fall of 2020. The school measures 37 rai (15 acres) and estimates it can hold up to 1200 students. Although initially starting with primary school children, the school now holds over 175 students K-12 with over 40 teachers.

=== Leadership ===
Stephen Ladas serves as the first Head of Schools (since 2020) for both the Bangkok and Udon Thani campuses. Lucas Lemley serves as the current Headmaster for the Bangkok campus, and Tim Michalek serves as the Principal for the Udon Thani campus.

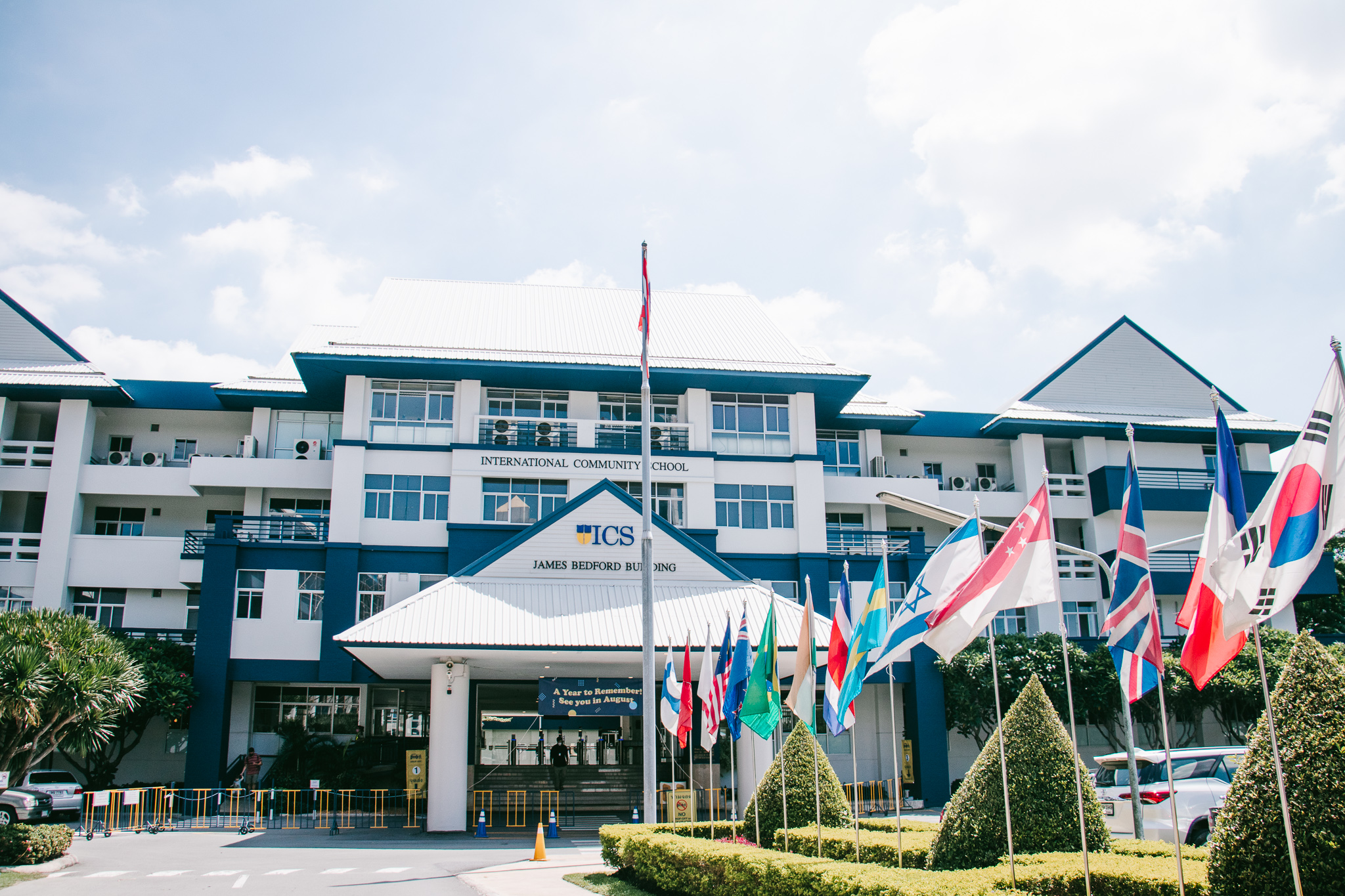
ICS Bangkok Campus
