= Korean International School of Bangkok =

- 방콕한국국제학교 โรงเรียนนานาชาติเกาหลี กรุงเทพ

Location
- 29/19, Moo 6, Soi 28 Mitmaitri, Nongchok, Bangkok 10530; Bangkok; Thailand
- Coordinates: 13.8623078°N 100.80019249999998°E

Information
- Type: Primary and secondary school
- Established: 2001
- Website: kisbangkok.co.kr

Korean International School of Bangkok (Korean: 방콕한국국제학교; Hanja: 방콕韓國國際學校; RR: Bangkok Hanguk Gukje Hakgyo, Thai: โรงเรียนนานาชาติเกาหลี กรุงเทพ, RTGS: Rong Rian Nana Chat Kaoli Krung Thep) is a Korean international school in Nongchok, Bangkok, Thailand.

The school serves up to the senior high school level.

It was established in 2001.

== See also ==
- Koreans in Thailand
