= American Pacific International School =

- โรงเรียนนานาชาติอเมริกันแปซิฟิก

Location
- 158/1 Moo 3 Hangdong-Samoeng Road; Banpong, Hangdong; Chiang Mai, 50230; Thailand; 18.788387587959424°N 98.8422678875713°E ,

Information
- Established: 1997; 29 years ago
- Headmaster: Stacey Gailey
- Grades: Pre-Nursery-12
- Website: http://www.apis.ac.th

American Pacific International School (Thai: โรงเรียนนานาชาติอเมริกันแปซิฟิก, RTGS: Rong Rian Nana Chat American Paesifik) is a privately owned boarding school in Chiang Mai, Thailand with a kindergarten, elementary school, middle school, and high school. The school operates on two campuses. American Pacific International School Primary (APISP) is in suburban Chiang Mai while the main boarding campus (MBC) is 25 kilometers from the city center. APISP has pre-nursery to grade 6 and the MBC has grades 5–12. It is a fee paying school, that opened in 1997, and makes annual tuition charges of 480,000 baht, or 12,800 USD.

== Residence ==
The school is one of only a few to accept residential students from the age of six. The school currently maintains four boarding houses: Odden Hall, Bundarik Hall, Sakthong House and Inthanon House.

== Curriculum ==
The school's curriculum aims to generate the skills of creativity and enquiry in a multi-cultural environment.

It offers an American-style curriculum to those aged from two to eighteen within Thailand, and is fully registered with the Royal Thai Ministry of Education. The school has been accredited by The Western Association of Schools and Colleges (WASC) from the United States. The current principal is Luis Ramirez. The current head of school is Stacey Gailey. Previous heads include Greg Schellenberg, Ross Hall, Peter Welch, Keith Wacker and Barry Sutherland. The founding head was Gordon Jones, formerly of the Taft School, Connecticut, USA.

== Teaching staff ==
The teaching staff of the school mainly originate from the United States, with some from Australia, Thailand and Canada. Keith Wecker, a previous head teacher, did a podcast in late 2006 about his experience of being the head of the school.
