= TSI International School =

- โรงเรียนนานาชาติทีเอสไอ

Location
- 1799 Rim Thang Rod Fai kao Moo-1 Samrong Nua, Samut Prakarn 10270 Thailand
- Coordinates: 13.6603°N 100.5947°E

Information
- Type: Private school
- Established: 1985
- Gender: Co-educational
- Website: tsi.ac.th

TSI International School, formerly Thai Sikh International School (TSI; Thai: โรงเรียนนานาชาติทีเอสไอ, RTGS: Rong Rian Nana Chat TSI), is an international school that has been operating since 1985. The school has two campuses. The Bearing Campus, which educates students in years Pre-Nursery–13, is located near Bearing BTS station in Samut Prakan, in the Bangkok Metropolitan Area. There is also a primary campus, which educates children from Nursery to year 6, in the Wongwianyai district of Bangkok.

The school offers the UK National Curriculum for students at all levels.

The school is partially funded by the Thai Sikh Foundation. The Thai Sikh Foundation handed management of the school to International Schools Services (ISS) between 2017-2023. When the ISS contract concluded in 2023, there were no changes to the leadership team, teachers or school policies.

While tuition fees have increased since 2017, the fees are low in comparison to many of Bangkok's international schools.

Both school campuses have age appropriate facilities such as swimming pools, basketball and tennis courts as well as a 360-metre running track around a football field.

While historically the majority of TSIS' students were of Indian descent, the student population has diversified considerably. Currently, about 20% of the students are Sikh.

The Bearing Campus is located on the eastern edge of Bangkok in the Mueang Samut Prakan District. The school site is over 30 rai in size. The campus includes an administrative block, a gymnasium and auditorium, air-conditioned assembly hall, art centre, computer laboratories, language centre, music centre, science laboratories and swimming pool.
