= Niva International School =

Private school in Bangkok, Thailand

NIVA American International School
- โรงเรียนนานาชาตินีวาอเมริกัน

Location
- 18 Soi Phokaew 3 Yeak 9, Ladprao 101 Road; Bangkok, 10240; Thailand
- Coordinates: 13.803033°N 100.633307°E

Information
- Other name: NIVA International School
- Type: private, college preparatory
- Motto: Building Skills for Excellence
- Established: 1991
- Founder: Nathannont Chaisuriyantharn
- School district: Klongchan, Bangkapi
- Grades: Nursery - Grade 12
- Gender: Mixed
- Age range: 3 to 18
- Accreditation: WASC and ONESQA
- Website: http://niva.ac.th

NIVA American International School (Thai: โรงเรียนนานาชาตินีวาอเมริกัน, RTGS: Rong Rian Nana Chat Niwa Amerikan) is a privately owned coeducational school located in Bang Kapi District, Bangkok, Thailand. NIVA is a K-12 school with approximately 350 students. The international school was founded in 1991. It uses a North American curriculum as its academic foundation while also incorporating selected international curricula for its culturally diverse students. The school groups its educational levels into nursery, kindergarten, elementary, middle, and high school levels. Teachers come from Asia, America, Australia, Africa, and Thailand. NIVA celebrated its 25-year anniversary in 2016 and its 30th anniversary in September 2021.

The name “NIVA” was coined from the first two letters of Nicholas and Vanisara, the children of the school's founders. The current meaning of “NIVA” stands for Nurturing, Innovative, Virtuous, and Achieving: the hallmarks of NIVA American International School.

== Curriculum ==
Originally a British curriculum school, Niva first offered private studies to overseas students who wanted to sit for the International General Certificate of Secondary Education examinations, though in time, it expanded to include younger students. Over time, it incorporated American and other international elements in its program. In 2004, the Thai Ministry of Education approved the school's American curriculum from Kindergarten through grade 12, allowing its students to follow an American/International path to graduation. All subjects at Niva IS, with the exception of Thai, Chinese and modern languages, are taught in the English language.

== NIVA is accredited by ==
The Western Association of Schools and Colleges, CA, USA (WASC).

The Office for National Education Standards and Quality Assessment, Thailand. (ONESQA)

== NIVA is a member of ==
International Schools Association of Thailand (ISAT)

International Schools Athletic Association (ISAA)

== History Timeline ==
1991 - NIVA Overseas School (NOS) is founded to help children of expatriates living in Thailand and Thai students returning home from abroad preparing for the British IGCSEs.

1999 - NIVA International Kindergarten (NIK) opens to cater to younger students.

2001 - The combined number of students at NOS and NIK reaches 250, necessitating a new, bigger campus.

2002 - The new seven-rai campus in Soi 101 on Ladprao Road is ready for both NOS and NIK to move in and be combined as NIVA International School in August.

2004 - NIVA adopts the American Curriculum.

2010- NIVA obtains the accreditation from Thailand's Ministry of Education and the United States’ Western Association of Schools and Colleges (WASC).

2011- With the addition of the second building, NIVA celebrated its 20th anniversary.

2016 - NIVA held a grand alumni homecoming in celebration of its 25th anniversary.

2018- NIVA renames itself as NIVA American International School.

2020- Implementation of online classes and extra health and safety measures commences in April due to the COVID-19 pandemic.

2021 - NIVA American receives the ‘COVID-19 Clean & Safe School’ certification from Thailand's Department of Health, Ministry of Public Health in January.

2021 - NIVA American celebrates its 30th anniversary in September.
