= Grace International School =

International school in Chiang Mai, Thailand

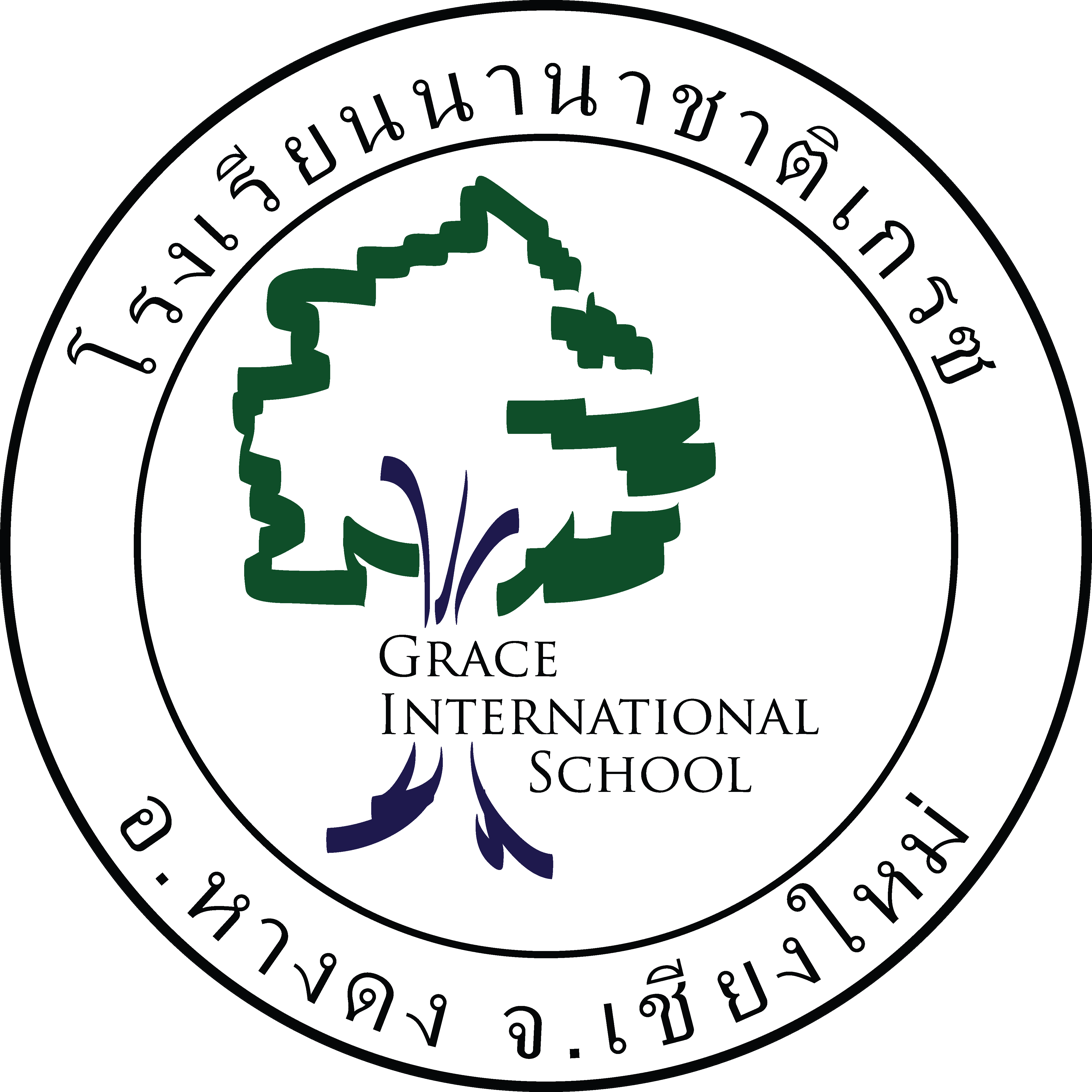

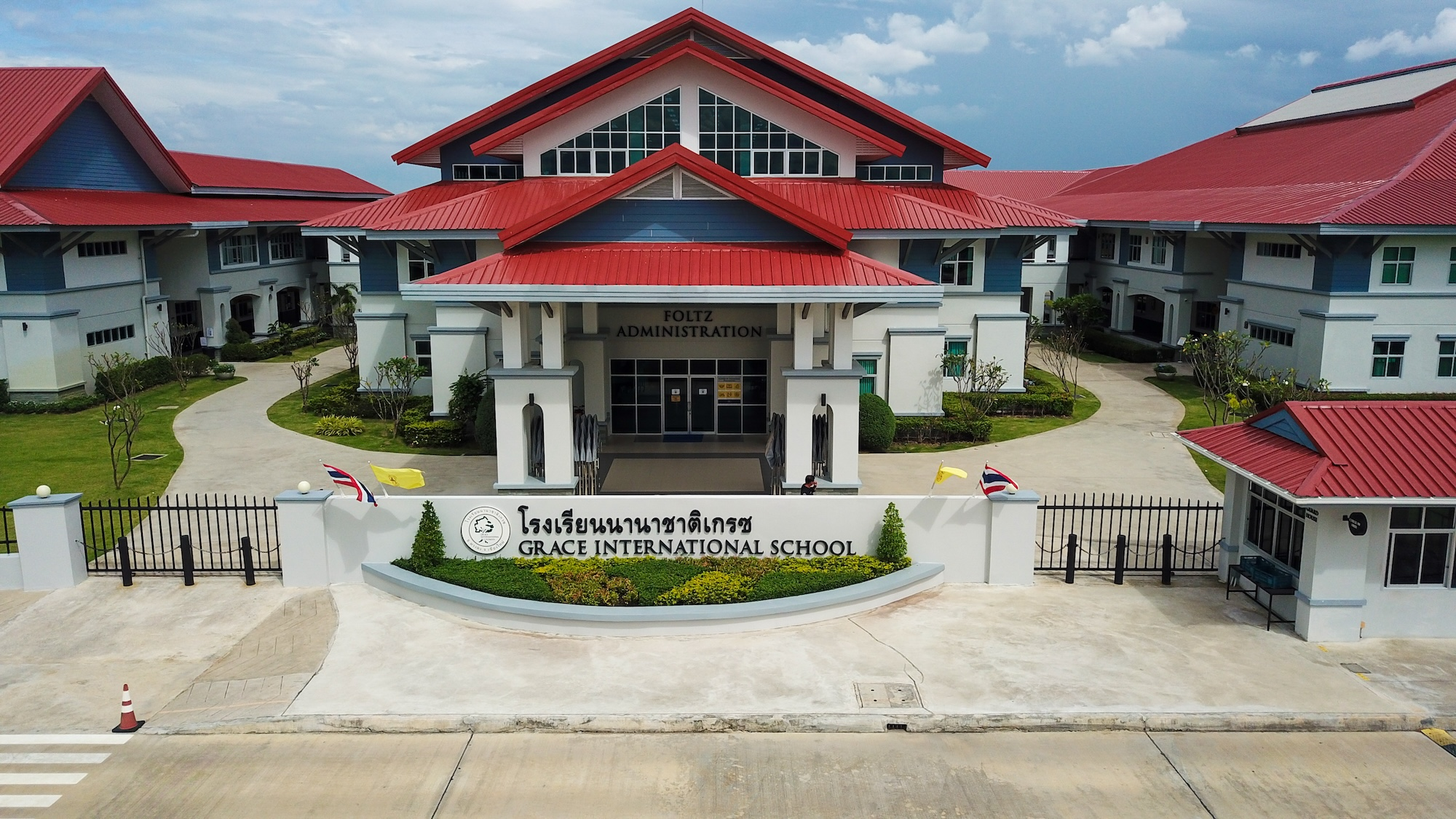

Location
- 88 Muu 3 T. Harn Kaew A. Chiang Mai 50230, Thailand; 18.64974622643315°N 98.9139502232929°E

Information
- Motto: Enable. Equip. Cultivate.
- Established: 1999
- Superintendent: Steve Anderson
- Grades: K-12
- Enrollment: Approx. 600 students with 25 nationalities represented
- Color: Navy Yellow
- Mascot: Grace Tiger
- Accreditation: WASC, ACSI
- Website: https://gisthailand.org/

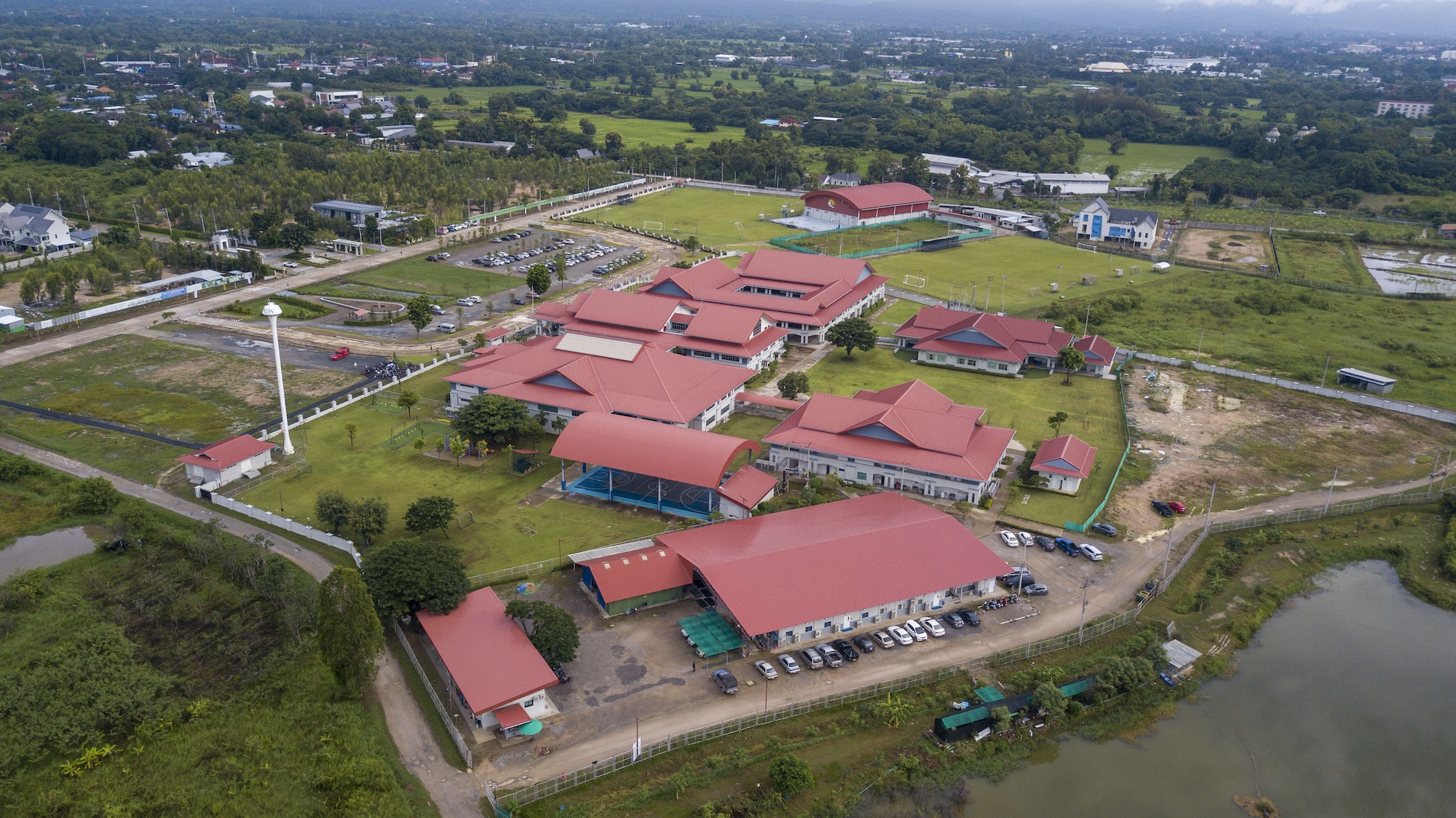
Aerial view of the Grace International School campus

Grace International School (GIS; Thai: โรงเรียนนานาชาติเกรซ, RTGS: Rong Rian Nana Chat Kret) is an international school in Chiang Mai, Thailand, that was founded in 1999 for the education of the children of international Christian workers living in the area. There are over 600 students from kindergarten through 12th grade, and these students represent a wide range of nationalities and ethnicities. Most of the students are TCK's (Third Culture Kids) and so in addition to representing various countries, students have a wide array of experiences living in countries as foreigners. The teachers are volunteers.

GIS is accredited by the Western Association of Schools and Colleges (WASC) and the Association of Christian Schools International (ACSI). GIS uses a US-based curriculum and most graduates go to the United States for higher education, although a large percentage move to the Republic of Korea (ROK), New Zealand, Australia, or remain in Thailand.

The school is also certified as a Best Christian Workplace since 2023.

== Academics ==
Grace International School is a Christian international school that offers a rigorous, college-preparatory American curriculum. The school is divided into three sections: Elementary, Middle School, and High School, each providing a comprehensive and challenging academic program. In addition, they offer Educational Support, TESOL programs, and AP (Advance Placement) courses.

== Extracurriculars ==
Their extracurricular activities include after-school clubs, visual and performing arts (band, choir, fine arts), and sports. The school offers basketball, soccer, volleyball, futsal, cross country, running club, and rec league. GIS is a part of the Chiang Mai Athletic Conference (CMAC). The conference members consist of international schools in Chiang Mai, Thailand, that would like to have organized competitive games between schools.

== Campus ==
Grace International School is nestled in the heart of Chiang Mai, Thailand, on a sprawling 37-acre campus. As of 2024, the school boasts seven well-equipped buildings: Administration, Elementary, Middle School, High School, Cafeteria, Facilities, and Fitness Center. The campus also features outdoor courts, covered courts, and soccer fields, providing ample space for sports and recreational activities.
