= East Asia Regional Council of Overseas Schools =

- Formation: December 1968
- Headquarters: East Asia
- Website: https://www.earcos.org/

The East Asia Regional Council of Schools (EARCOS) is an organization of 158 member schools in East Asia. These schools have a total of more than 132,000 pre-K to 12th grade students. EARCOS also has 170 associate members, including textbook and software publishers and distributors, universities, financial planners, architectural firms, insurance companies, youth organizations. It has over 35 individual members.

Membership in EARCOS is open to elementary and secondary schools in East Asia which offer an educational program using English as the primary language of instruction, and to other organizations, institutions, and individuals interested in the objectives and purposes of the Council.

EARCOS was founded in December 1968, and held their first conference in November 1969.
