= Harrow International School =

Harrow International School may refer to:

- Harrow International School Bangkok
- Harrow International School Beijing
- Harrow International School Hong Kong
