= Regent's International School, Bangkok =

- โรงเรียนนานาชาติเดอะรีเจ้นท์ กรุงเทพ
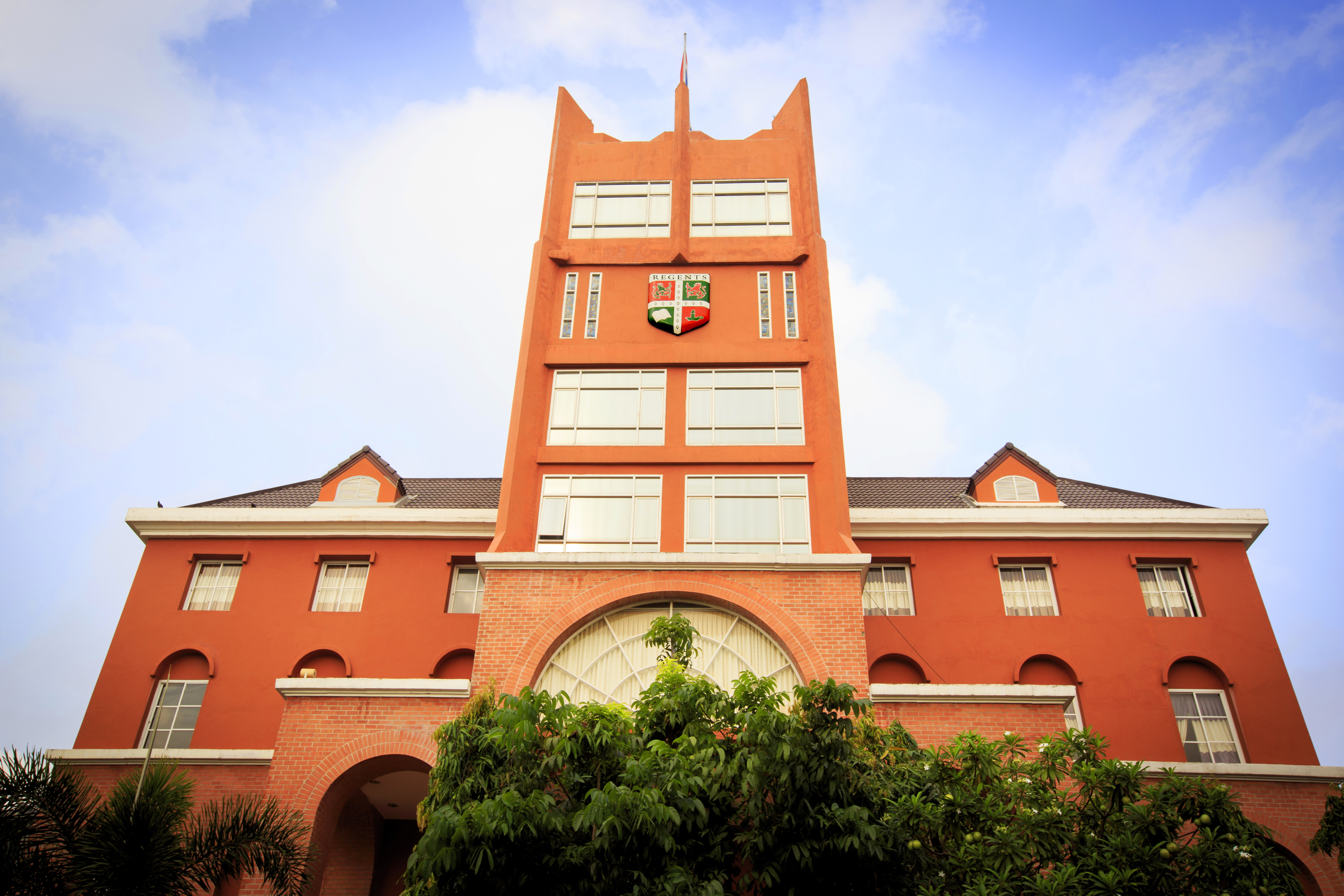

Location
- 601/99 Pracha-Uthit Road, Wangthonglang; Bangkok, Bangkok, 10310; Thailand; 13.767414°N 100.595770°E

Information
- Type: International School; Co-educational Day and Boarding school
- Established: 1995
- Founder: Dr. Virachai Techavijit
- Head teacher: Mr Andy Simons
- Gender: Mixed
- Age: 2 to 18
- Enrolment: 800
- Website: www.regents.ac.th

Regent's International School, Bangkok (Thai: โรงเรียนนานาชาติเดอะรีเจ้นท์ กรุงเทพ, RTGS: Rong Rian Nana Chat Doe Richen Krung Thep) is a day and boarding school for students aged 2 – 18. The school is guided by the English National Curriculum from the Early Years Foundation Stage (EYFS) leading to IGCSE (International General Certificate of Secondary Education) and IB (International Baccalaureate) Diploma Programme in the Sixth Form.

The school has partnered with Premier League Football Academy and Yamaha Music School to provide students with training in football and music.

== Facilities ==
The school campus includes four buildings, an artificial turf playing field, two swimming pools, basketball court, tennis court, a sports complex, a theatre, safe play area, libraries, well-equipped science labs, Yamaha music room, and gym.

== Teachers and students ==
Of the students currently enrolled, there are over 35 nationalities represented. The majority of teachers and boarding staff are British. There are also Irish, Australian, New Zealand, Canadian and American staff. All are first language English speakers except for Thai, Mandarin, Spanish and French language teachers and all teaching staff have UK accredited Qualified Teacher Status.

== Memberships and accreditation ==
Regent's International School Bangkok joined the Round Square Association in 2001. The curriculum is derived in part from the membership of Round Square and the ideals of internationalism, democracy, environmental, adventure, leadership, and service.

The school is a member of Federation of British International Schools in Asia (FOBISIA), Council of International Schools, and British Boarding School Association. The school is accredited internationally by CIS, and nationally by ONESQA.

== Scholarships ==
- Bhutanese Scholarship
- UN Sponsored Awards
- Music Scholarship
- Global Connect Scholarship
- Olympiad Scholarship
- British Boarding Scholarship Programme
- Diplomatic Connect Programme

== Fees and tuition ==
Prior to matriculation, non-refundable fees of 155,500 baht are payable. Tuition fees range from 370,530 – 678,420 baht per year depending on the child's age. Boarding fees range from 89,400 – 103,900 baht per year.

== Gallery ==
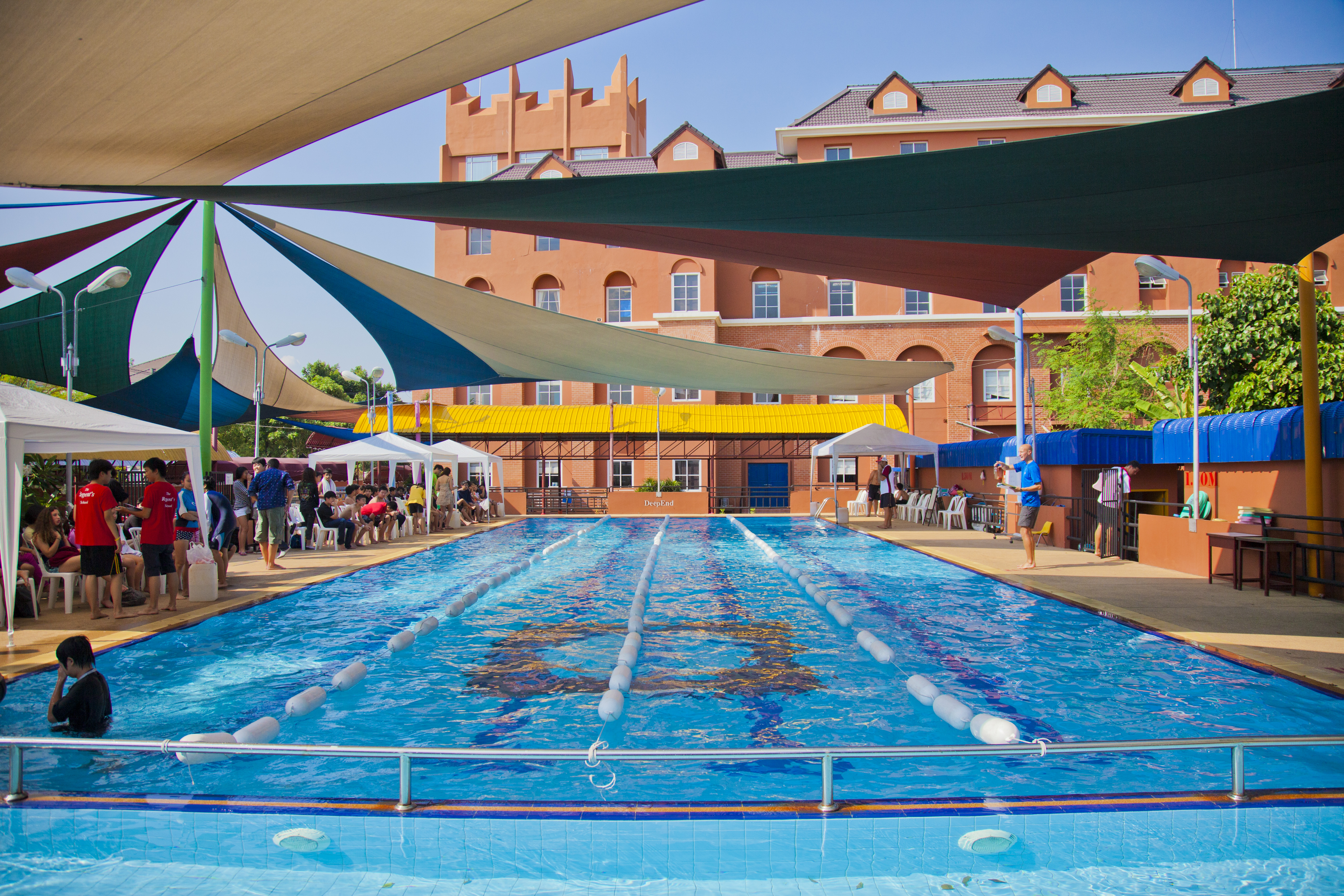
Swimming Pool

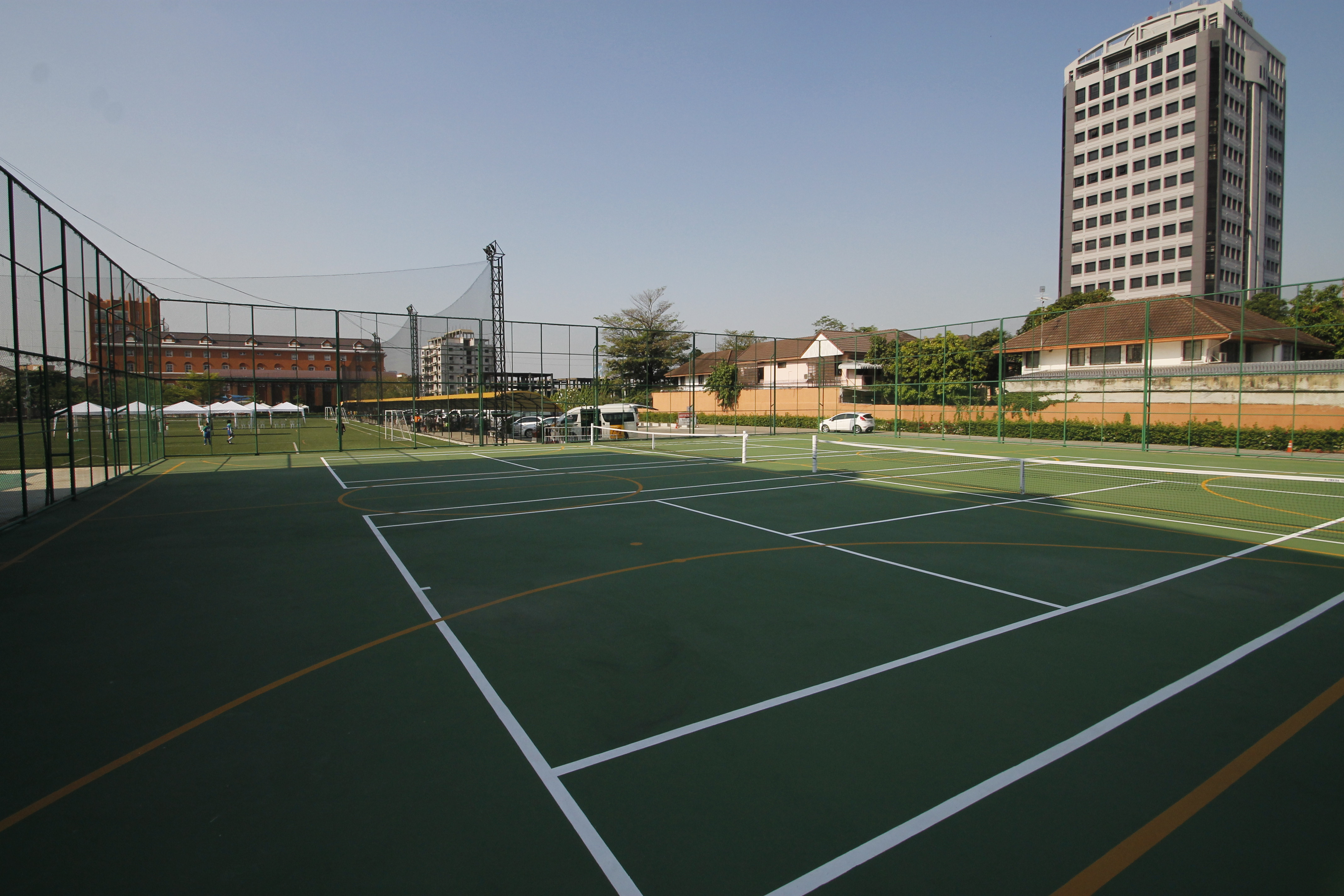
Tennis Court

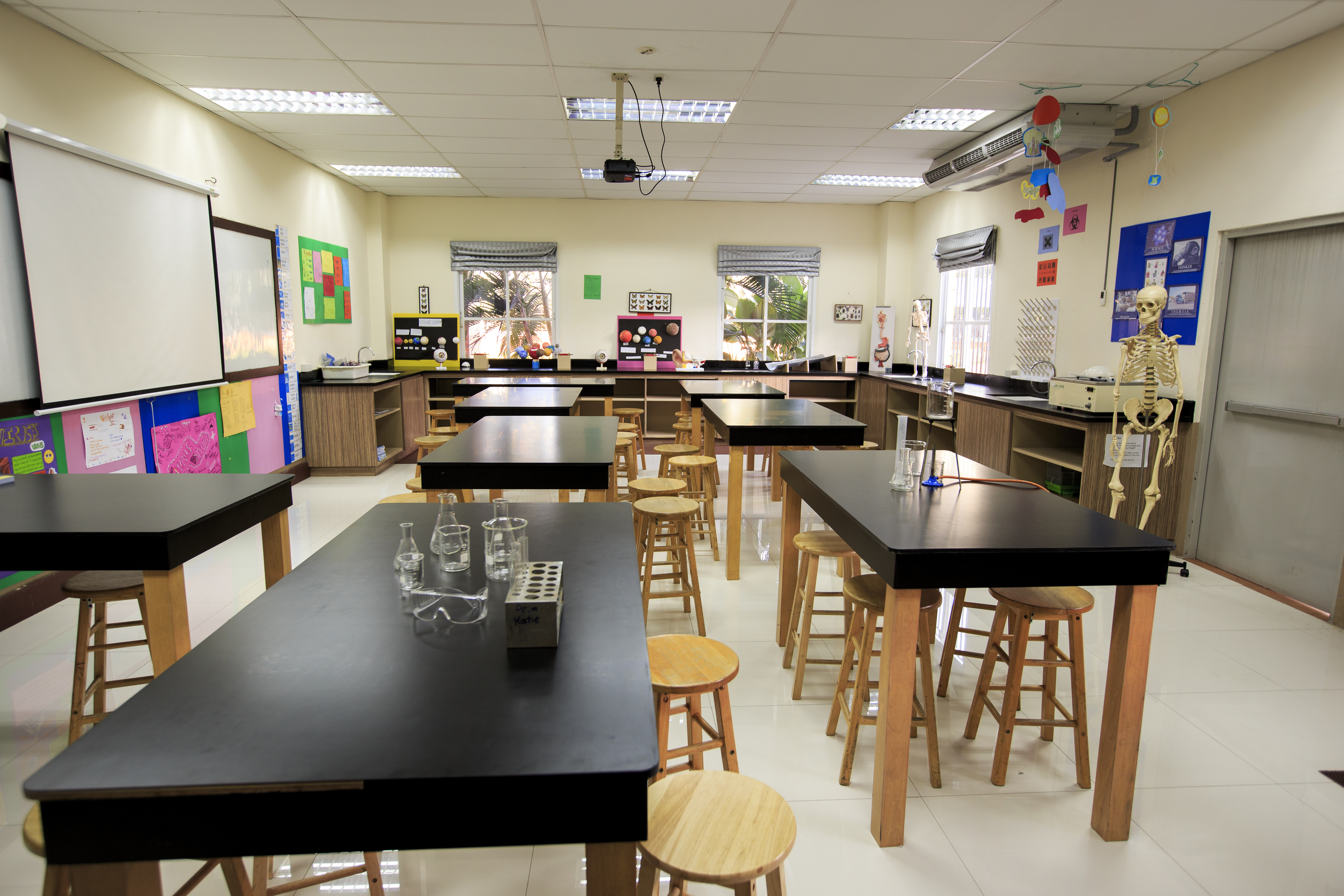
Science Lab

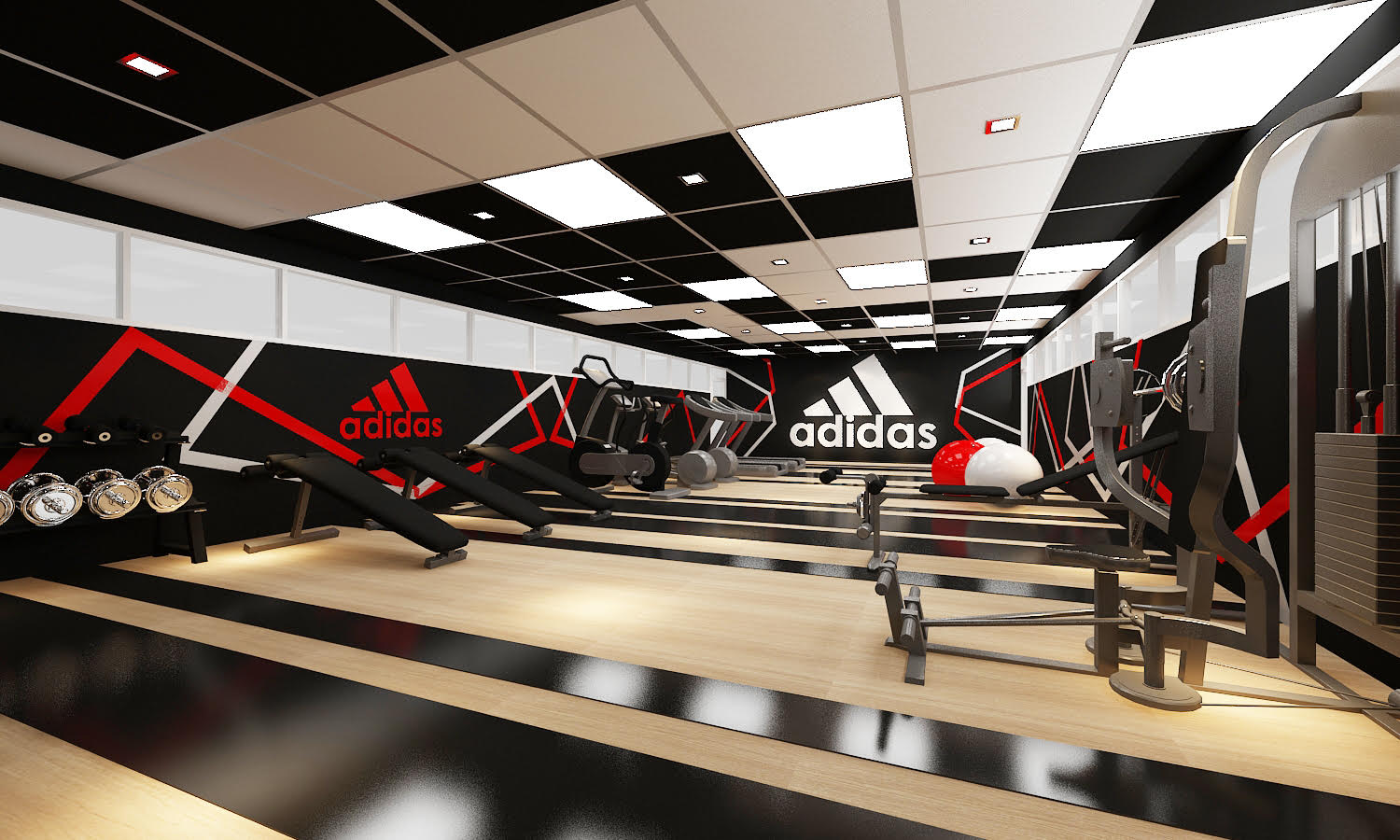
Gym

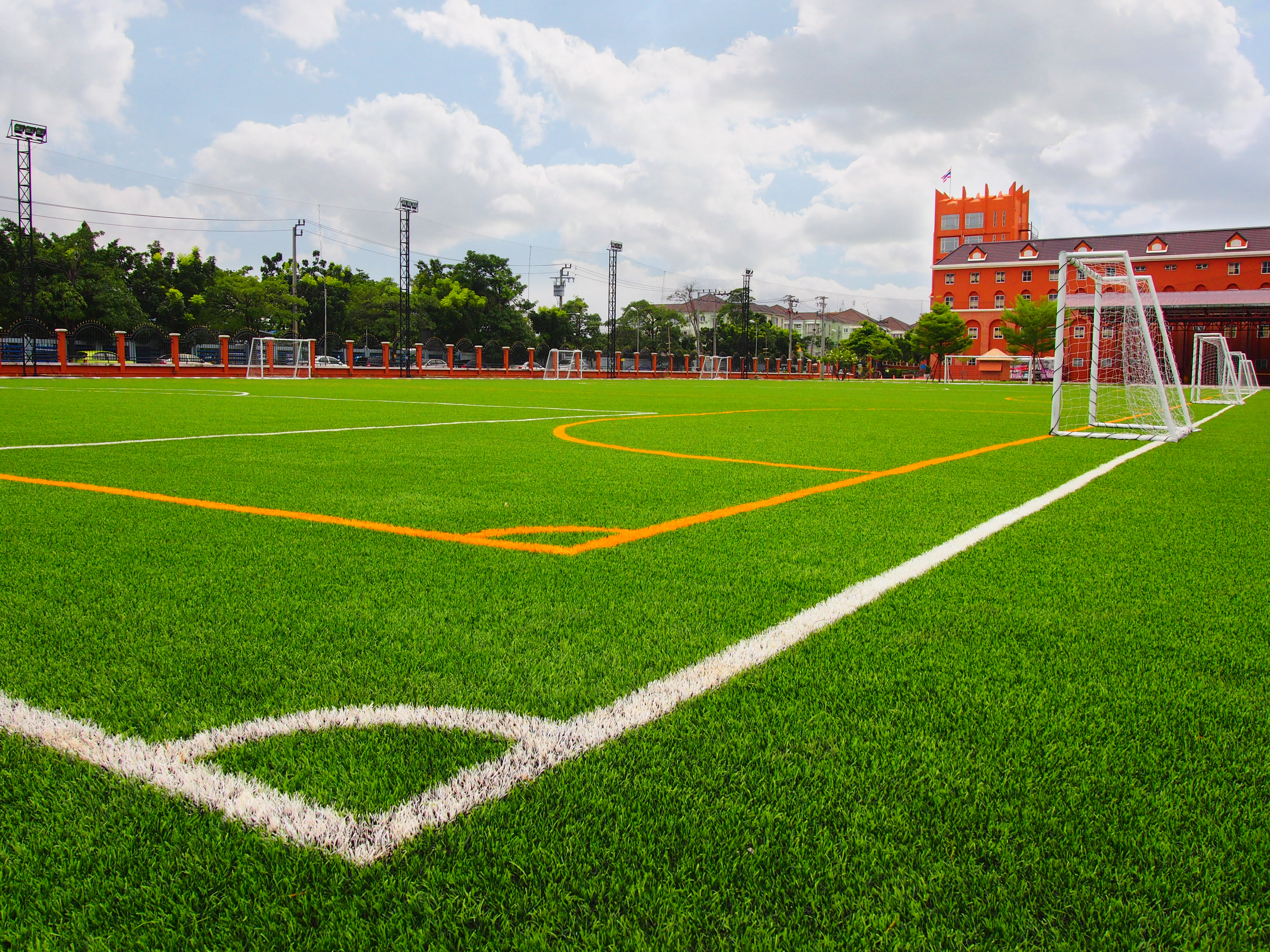
Artificial Turf Football Field

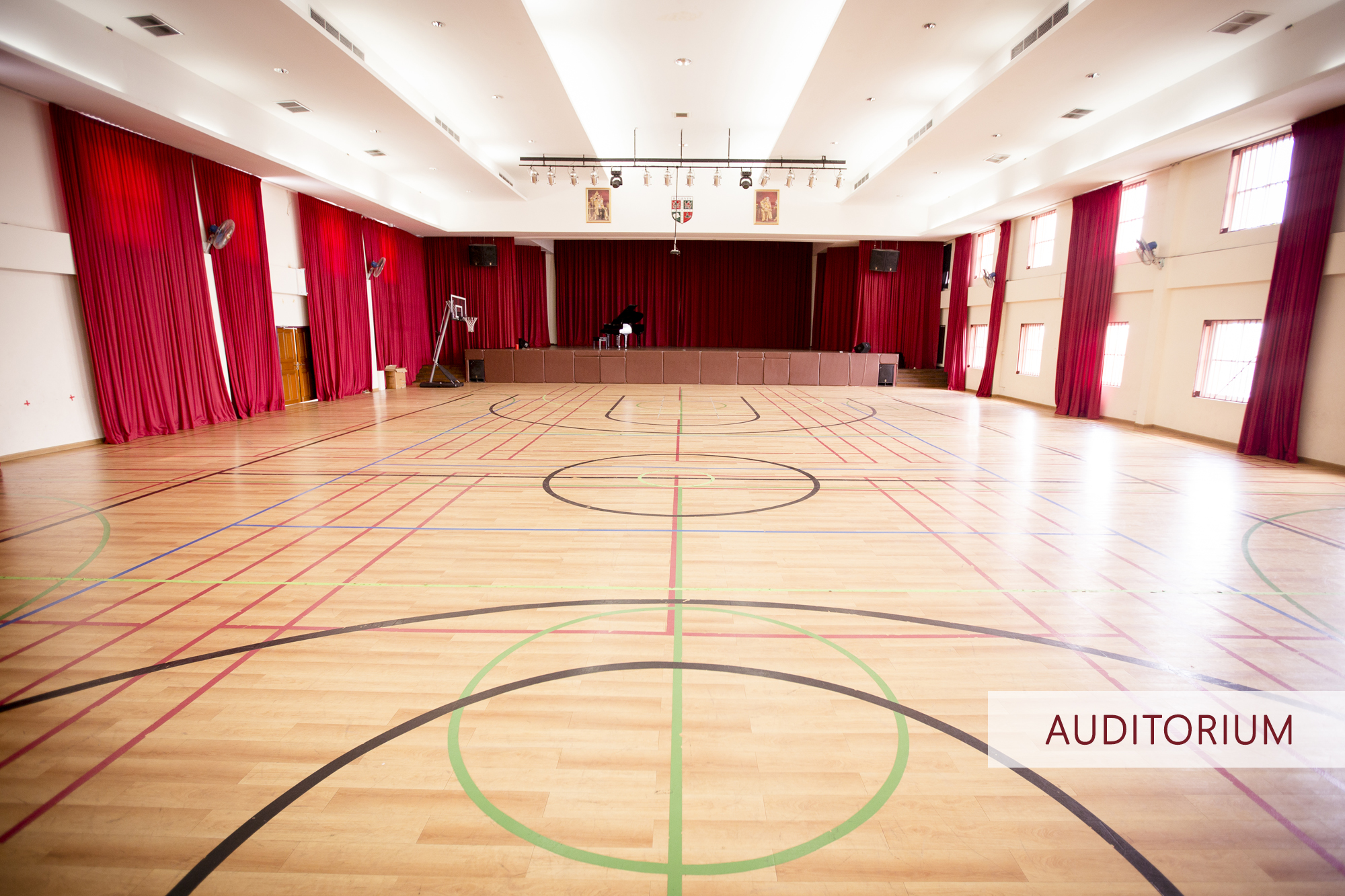
Auditorium
