= Harrow International School Shanghai =

Harrow International School Shanghai 上海哈罗国际学校

Location
- No.588 Gaoxi Road, Pudong, Shanghai; China
- Coordinates: 31.3173693°N 121.5901144°E

Information
- Type: International secondary school
- Motto: Educational excellence for life and leadership
- Opened: August, 2016
- Headmaster: Alexander B. Reed
- Years offered: Early years (K1 & K2) to Y13
- Gender: Co-educational
- Website: harrowshanghai.cn

Harrow International School Shanghai
- Simplified Chinese: 上海哈罗国际学校
- Traditional Chinese: 上海哈羅國際學校
Transcriptions
Standard Mandarin
- Hanyu Pinyin: Shànghǎi Hāluó Guójì Xuéxiào

Harrow International School Shanghai (Chinese: 上海哈罗国际学校) is a private secondary school in Pudong, Shanghai. It opened in August 2016.

== See also ==
- Harrow International School Bangkok
- Harrow International School Beijing
- Harrow International School Hong Kong
