= Federation of British International Schools in Asia =

Regional federation of leading British International schools in Asia

- Logo of FOBISIA
- Trade name: FOBISIA
- Formerly: Federation of British International Schools in South and East Asia(FOBISSEA)
- Founded: 1988; 38 years ago at British School Jakarta
- Founder: Ronald Stones OBE
- Headquarters: Bangkok, Thailand
- Number of locations: 102
- Area served: Asia-wide
- Key people: John Gwyn Jones MBE (CEO)
- Services: Promoting and supporting a UK-style education in Asia; Hosting competitions and events between member schools of FOBISIA
- Owner: John Gwyn Jones MBE
- Members: 102
- Divisions: 3
- Website: https://www.fobisia.org/

The Federation of British International Schools in Asia (FOBISIA) is a federation of leading British international schools in Asia.

Founded in 1988, FOBISIA was first called the Federation of British International Schools in South East Asia (FOBISSEA), and known for promoting a British-style education system in schools throughout Asia. FOBISIA hosts sporting, academic, drama, musical, art, and debating competitions. A key aim of FOBISIA is also the opportunity for teachers from member schools to attend training workshops. FOBISIA schools are mostly located in China, Malaysia, Thailand, and Vietnam, where they have more than 5 member schools.

== History ==
Founded in 1988 by Ronald Stones OBE at British School Jakarta, FOBISIA began as an information-sharing and discussion group among five international schools in Asia. Namely, The British School Jakarta, Kota Kinabalu School, Tanglin Trust School, Tanglin Trust School, and the Alice Smith School. They first offered a British-style curriculum in regions far away from the "home base." In Asia, FOBISSEA had expanded to 20 member schools by the early 1990s. Coordinated sports events, known as the "FOBISSEA Games" was established during that period, which strengthened the networks between British International Schools. The federation continued to grow rapidly over the past decades and ended up at over a whopping 100 member schools in 20 countries. By 2011, FOBISSEA had 32 member schools from 10 countries around Asia. In 2013, FOBISSEA changed its name to FOBISIA following the expansion of their membership into China. FOBISIA finally saw itself welcome their first ever CEO by 2019, John Gwyn Jones MBE. As of today, FOBISIA reached the milestone of over 100 member schools from all over Asia.

== Members ==
=== Brunei (Region B) ===
- International School Brunei
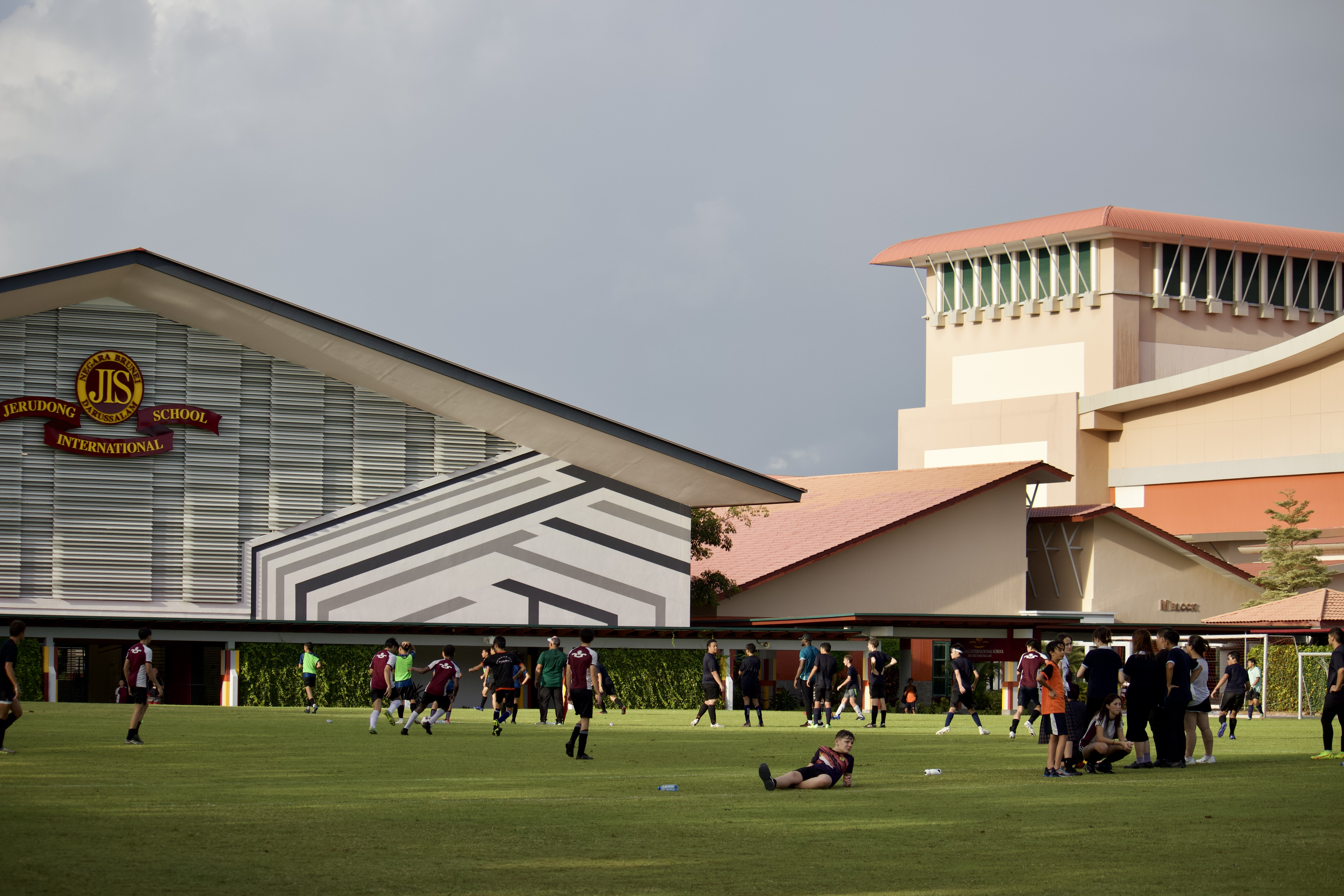
  Jerudong International School
- Jerudong International School
- Panaga School (PSB)

=== Cambodia (Region A) ===
- Northbridge International School Cambodia

=== China & Hong Kong (Region C) ===
- Discovery Bay International School(DBIS)

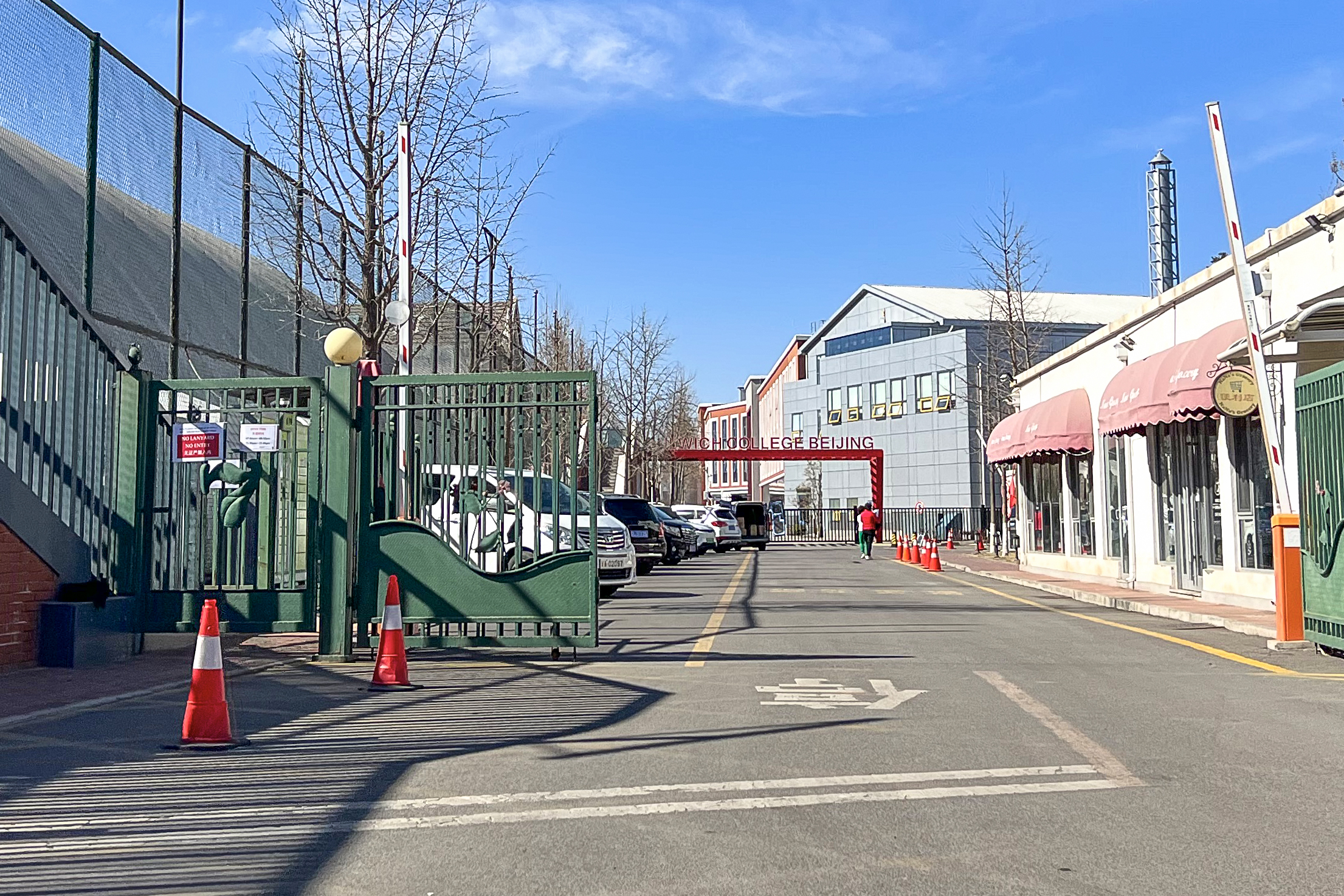
Dulwich College Beijing

- Dulwich College Beijing (DCB)
- Dulwich College Shanghai Pudong (DCS/DCSPD)
- Dulwich College Shanghai Puxi (DCSPX)
- Dulwich College Suzhou (DCSZ)

Harrow International School Beijing

- Harrow International School Beijing (HISC)
- Huili School Hangzhou (HSH)
- Kellett School Hong Kong (KSHK)
- Nord Anglia International School Shanghai, Pudong (NAIS)
- Nord Anglia International School Hong Kong. (NAIS)
- Shenzhen College of International Education (SCIE)
- Shrewsbury International School Hong Kong (SHK)
- The British International School Shanghai, Puxi (BISSPX)
- The British School of Beijing, Sanlitun (BSB SLT)
- The British School of Guangzhou (BSG)
- Wellington College International Hangzhou (WCIH)
- Wellington College International Shanghai (WCIS)

=== Indonesia (Region B) ===
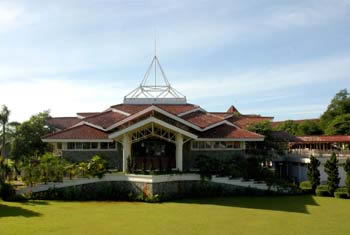
British International School Jakarta

- British School Jakarta (BSJ)

=== India (Region A) ===
- Canadian International School, Bangalore (CIS)
- The British School New Delhi (TBSND)

=== Malaysia (Region B) ===
- Crescendo HELP International School (CHIS)
- elc International School (elc)
- Eaton International School (EIS)
- Epsom College in Malaysia (ECiM)
- Garden International School Kuala Lumpur (GISKL)

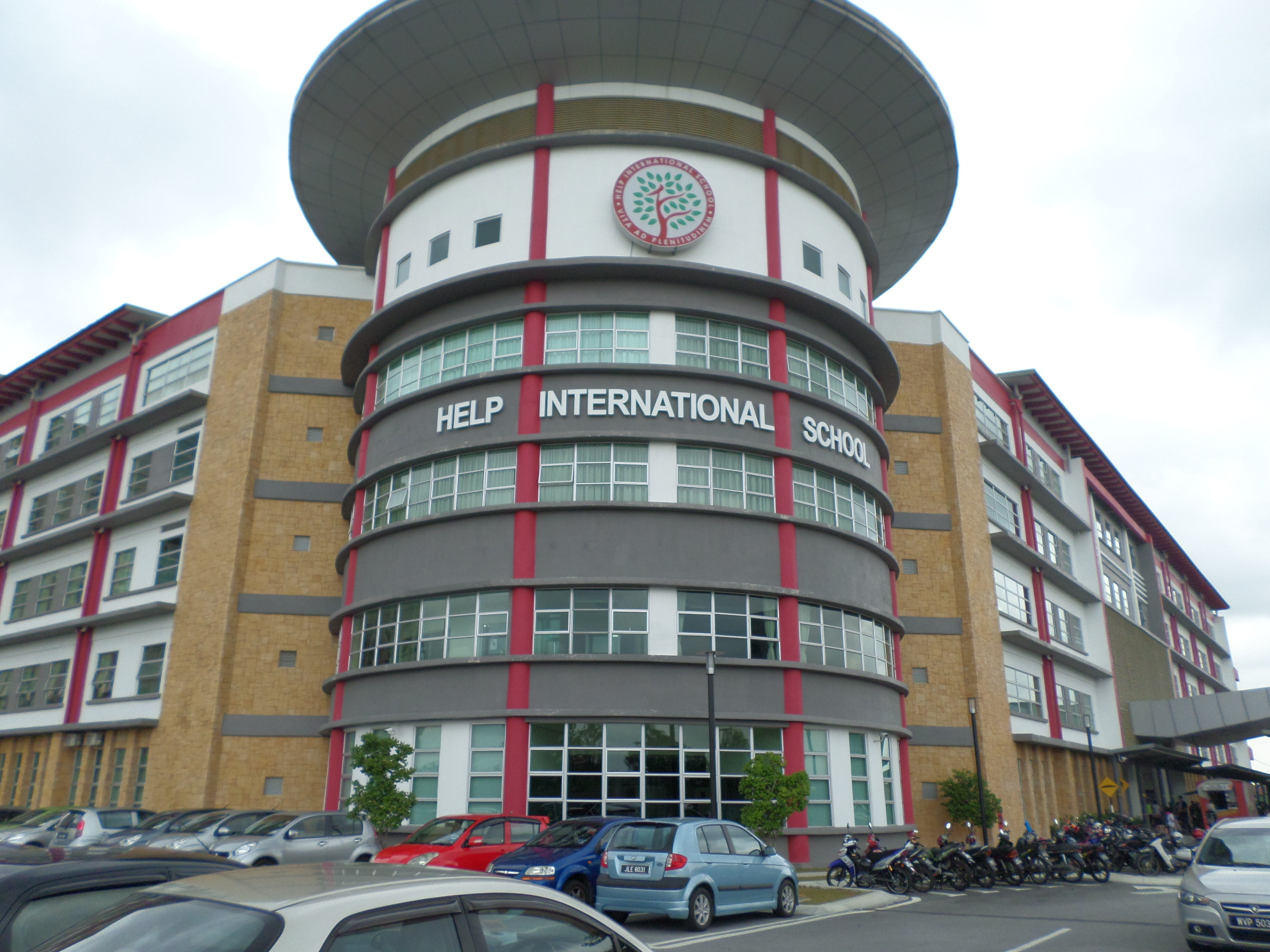
HELP International School

- HELP International School (HIS)
- Kinabalu International School (KIS)
- King Henry VIII College (KH8)
- Kolej Tuanku Ja’afar (KTJ)
- Marlborough College Malaysia (MCM)
- Nexus International School (NISM)
- Prince of Wales Island International School, Penang (POWIIS)
- Prince of Wales Island International Primary School (POWIIS Primary)
- Invictus International School
- Sri KDU International School (SKIS)
- Sri KDU International School, Subang Jaya (SISJ)
- St. Christopher’s International School, Penang (SCIS)
- Stonyhurst International School Penang
- St. Joseph's Institution International School Malaysia, Tropicana PJ Campus (SJII)
- Tenby Schools Setia Eco Park
- The Alice Smith School, Kuala Lumpur (KLASS)
- The British International School of Kuala Lumpur (BSKL)
- The International School@Park City (ISP)
- The International School of Penang (Uplands) (ISPU)
- Sri KDU International School, Penang (SISP)

=== Mongolia (Region C) ===
- The English School of Mongolia (ESM)

=== Myammar (Region A) ===
- Network International School
- The British School Yangon (BISY)

=== Japan (Region C) ===
- The British School in Tokyo

=== Kazakhstan (Region C) ===
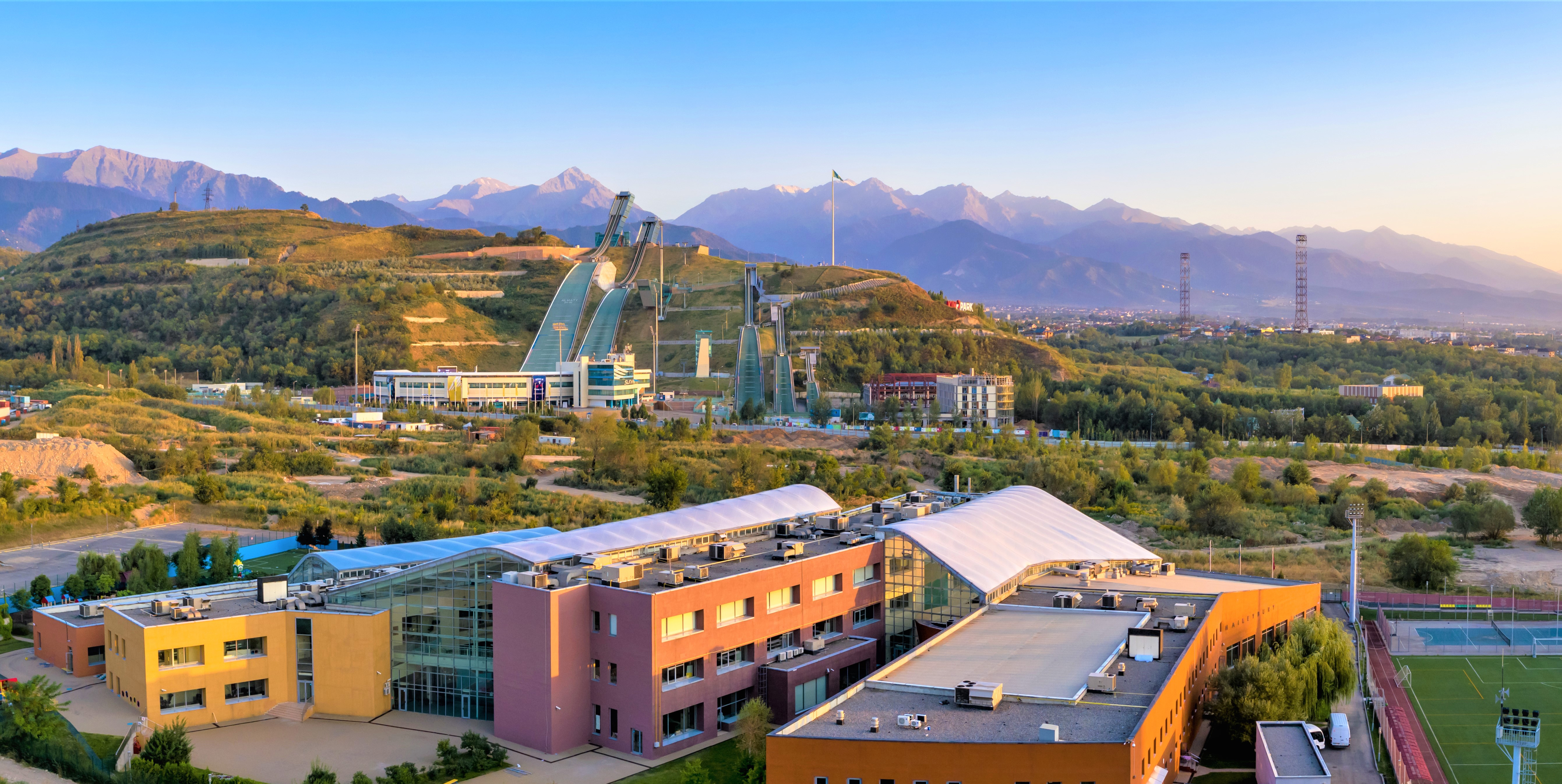
Haileybury Almaty

- Haileybury Almaty (HBA) & their campus in Astana (HAS)

=== Laos (Region A ===
- Panyathip British International School

=== Nepal (Region A) ===
- The British School, Kathmandu

=== Philippines (Region C) ===
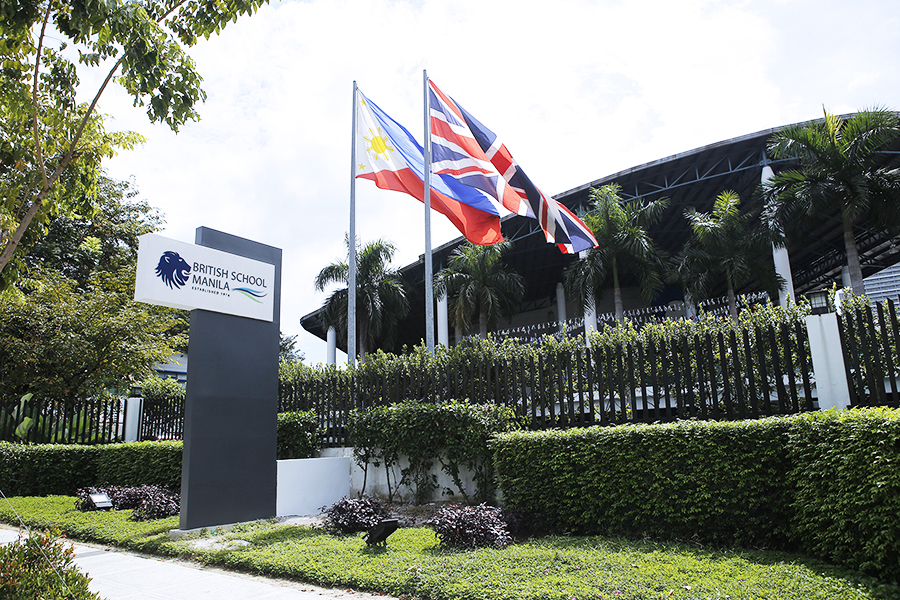
British School Manilla

- British School Manila

=== Singapore (Region B) ===
- Brighton College (Singapore)
- Dover Court International School (DCIS)
- Dulwich College (Singapore) (DCSG)
- Nexus International School (Singapore) (NISS)
- North London Collegiate School (Singapore) (NLCS)
- Tanglin Trust School (TTS)

=== South Korea (Region C) ===
- Dulwich College Seoul
- North London Collegiate School Jeju
- Seoul foreign school

=== Sri Lanka (Region A) ===
- The British School in Colombo (BSC)

=== Taiwan (Region C) ===
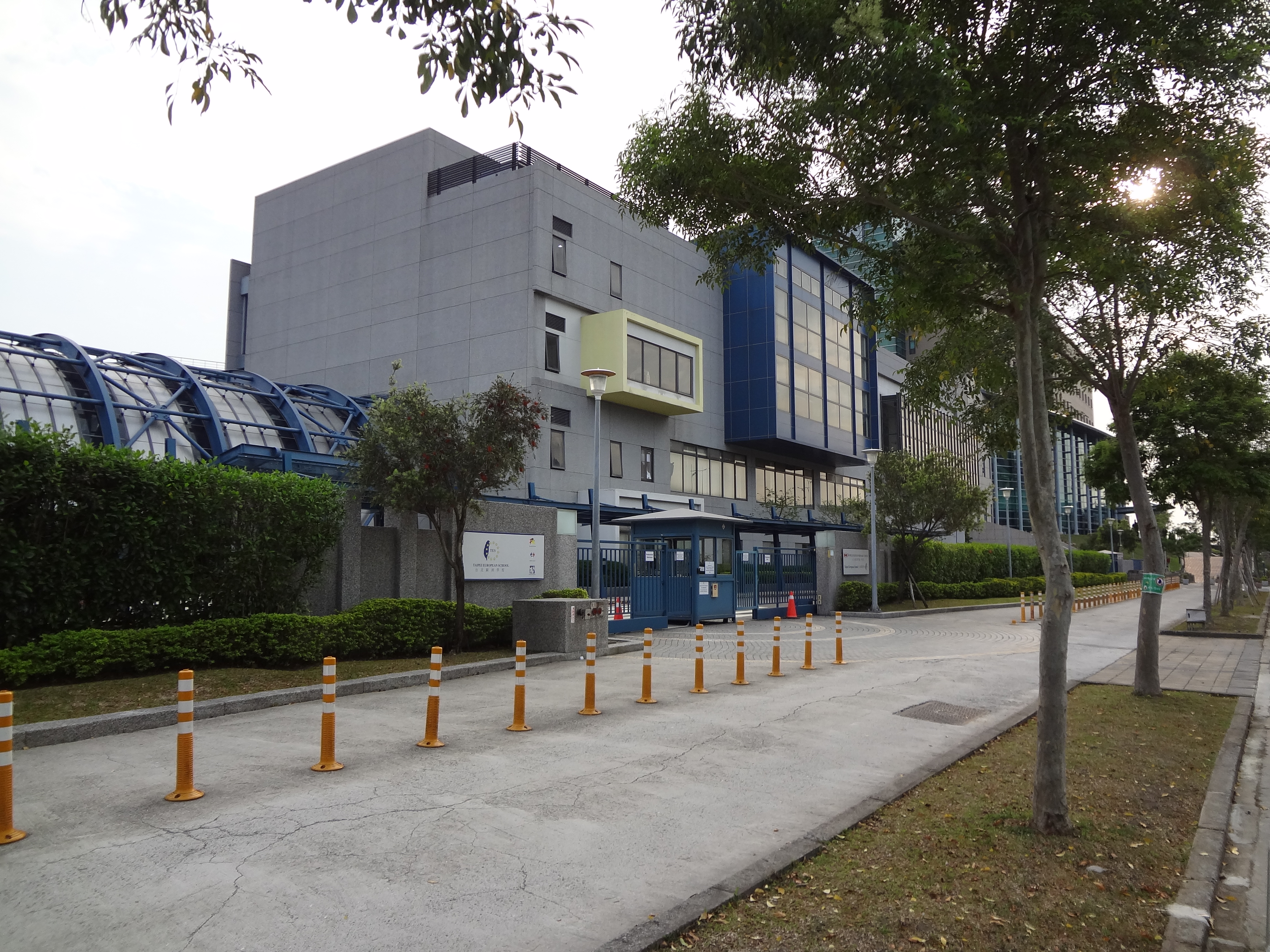
Taipei European School

- Taipei European School(TES)

=== Thailand (Region A) ===
- Amnuay Silpa School (ANS)
- Aster International School Bangkok
- Bangkok International Preparatory & Secondary School (BPREP)
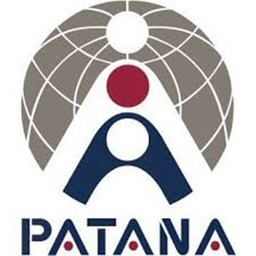
  Bangkok Patana School
- Bangkok Patana School (BPS)
- Brighton College International School Bangkok (BCBK)
- British International School Phuket (BISP)
- Bromsgrove International School, Thailand (BIST)
- Charter International School (CHA)
- Denla British School (DBS)
- Garden International School Eastern Seaboard (GISR)
- Garden International School, Sathorn, Bangkok (GISBKK)
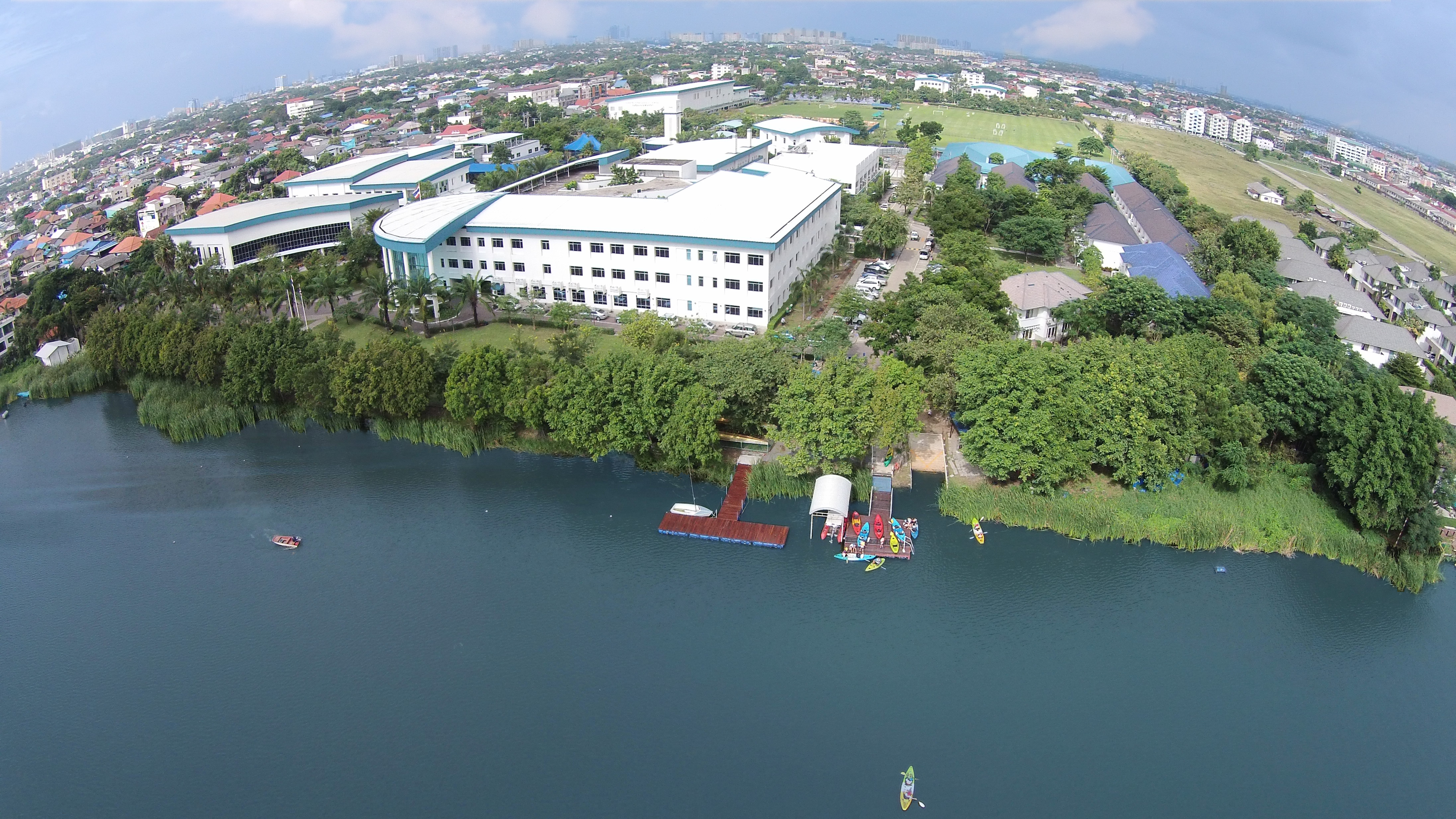
  Harrow International School Bangkok
- Harrow International School Bangkok (HISB)
- Headstart International School Phuket.
- Hua Hin International School (HHIS)
- King's College International School Bangkok (KINGS)
- Lanna International School Thailand
- RBIS International School (RBIS)
- Regent's International School Bangkok (REGB)
- Regents International School Pattaya (RISP)
- Rugby School Thailand (RST)
- Shrewsbury International School, City Campus (SHC)
- Shrewsbury International School, Bangkok Riverside (SHR)
- Singapore International School Bangkok (SISB)
- St. Andrews International School Bangkok (StAB)
- St. Andrews International School Green Valley (StAG)
- St. Andrews International School Sukhumvit 107 (StA107)
- St. Stephen's International Schools Bangkok & Khao Yai Campuses (SIS)
- Traill International School (TIS)
- Wellington College International School Bangkok (WCISB)

=== Uzbekistan (Region C) ===
- The British School of Tashkent (TBST)

=== Vietnam (Region A) ===
- British International School Hanoi (BISHN)
- British International School Ho Chi Minh City (BISHM)
- British Vietnamese International School Hanoi (BVISHN)
- British Vietnamese International School HCMC (BVISHM)
- Renaissance International School Saigon (RIS)
- The ABC International School (ABCIS)
