= British International School Hanoi =

School in Hanoi, Vietnam

Coordinates: 21°2′40″N 105°55′9″E

- Hanoi; Vietnam

Information
- Type: International, Private
- Motto: Be Ambitious
- Established: August 2012
- Principal: Richard Vaughan
- Age range: 2–18
- Website: www.nordangliaeducation.com/our-schools/vietnam/hanoi/bis

The British International School Hanoi, commonly referred to as BIS Hanoi, is an international school in the Vinhomes Riverside neighbourhood of Hanoi, Vietnam. It is also a part of the Nord Anglia Education group and is one of four British International schools in Vietnam. The school provides a British-style education for children aged two to eighteen.

== Curriculum ==
The Early Years Foundation Stage and primary school curriculum are based on the National Curriculum for England and the International Primary Curriculum. Students prepare for the International General Certificate of Secondary Education during their 10th and 11th years. Despite this, years 12 and 13, curriculum switch to the IB Diploma Programme.

It is a registered centre for the UK Cambridge Assessment International Education examination board.

The school is an IB world school, authorised to deliver the IB Diploma Programme. It is a member of the Federation of British International Schools in Asia and is accredited by the Council of International Schools and the Western Association of Schools and Colleges.

The school offers The Duke of Edinburgh's Award and also holds an annual international festival.

The student-to-teacher ratio is approximately 20:1.
