= Bangkok Prep =

Bangkok International Preparatory & Secondary School (Bangkok Prep)

Location
- Sukhumvit 77 (On Nut 1/1); Bangkok 10110; Thailand; 13.71485°N 100.60144°E

Information
- Type: Independent, Broad International school based on the National Curriculum of England
- Motto: Constant and True
- Established: 2003
- Founders: Patrada Yomnak and Magdalena Urioste
- Chairman: Anumongkol Sirivedhin
- Head of school: Duncan Stonehouse
- Enrollment: 1600
- Houses: Ursus (Bears), Panthera (Lions), Sabre (Tigers), Surus (Elephants)
- Colours: Blue and Grey
- Mascot: Bulldogs
- Accreditations: Council of International Schools (CIS), New England Association of Schools and Colleges (NEASC), Ministry of Education (Thailand), The Office for National Education Standards and Quality Assessment (ONESQA), International Schools Association of Thailand (ISAT) Bangkok International Schools Athletic Conference (BISAC)
- Website: www.bangkokprep.ac.th

Bangkok International Preparatory and Secondary School, or Bangkok Prep, is an independent international school based on the National Curriculum of England located in Bangkok, Thailand. Established in 2003, the school is now in its 23rd year. 1,600 students are enrolled at Bangkok Prep, representing 50 nationalities.

== History ==
Bangkok International Preparatory and Secondary School was established by two educators: Magdalena Urioste and Patrada Yomnak, who had extensive experience of international kindergartens, both in Bangkok and Hanoi, for more than 20 years. In 2003, Magdalena and Patrada founded an extension on Thong-Lo for their kindergarten students to continue on to Primary level. This evolved into Bangkok Prep.

Bangkok Prep was officially ordained by Her Royal Highness Princess Maha Chakri Sirindhorn in June 2006. In the 2009-2010 academic year, Bangkok Prep was the recipient of The Prime Minister's Export Award 2009 in International Education. The school won an award for "Outstanding Achievement in School Development and Management" at the World Education/Education Living Expo in 2010.

In 2012, Prime Minister Abhisit Vejjajiva was an inaugural guest speaker for Bangkok Prep's first graduating class. Students had been accepted into many notable universities worldwide, such as the University of Cambridge, Imperial College London, the London School of Economics, the University College of London, University of Toronto, New York University (NYU), University of California, Los Angeles (UCLA), Brown University and Cornell University.

A new purpose built Secondary campus opened in the T77 mixed-used development on Sukhumvit Soi 77 in 2017, with the Primary school also moving from its original location to the new campus in 2023.

== Academics and curriculum ==
Bangkok Prep follows an international curriculum based on the National Curriculum of England, offering education to pupils from Nursery up to Year 13.

The school is divided into three sections: Early Years (Nursery and Reception), Primary (Year 1 to Year 6), and Secondary (Year 7 to Year 13).

The Early Years unit follows the Early years foundation stage (EYFS) statutory framework for children aged between 3 and 5 years.

The Primary school and Secondary school are based on the National Curriculum of England.

- Key Stage 1: Year 1 and Year 2 classes.
- Key Stage 2: Year 3 to Year 6 classes.
- Key Stage 3: Years 7 to 9 and is the final preparation for the examination phase.
- Key Stage 4: Years 10 and 11. It is the examination phase and Bangkok Prep is registered with the Cambridge International Examinations which is part of the University of Cambridge in the UK as an examination centre for the International General Certificate in Secondary Education or IGCSE. An IGCSE programme is offered to Year 10 and Year 11 students as a precursor to the Cambridge-approved A-levels available to study in Year 12 and Year 13, thus preparing students towards university education.
- Key Stage 5 is the international advanced level examination phase, which is Years 12 and 13 or Sixth Form. Students begin to specialize in their studies and opt for subjects that will guide their choice of study at undergraduate level in university. Students are examined at the end of Year 13 on a minimum of one and a maximum of four A-Level examinations, administered by Edexcel.

== Professional accreditation ==
The school received triple accreditation from the Council of International Schools (CIS), New England Association of Schools and Colleges (NEASC) and Office for National Education Standards and Quality Assessment in 2011. The school is a member of the International Schools Association of Thailand (ISAT), Federation of British International Schools in Asia (FOBISIA), Bangkok International Schools Athletic Conference (BISAC) and Thailand International Schools Activity Conference (TISAC) as well as the Cambridge University-approved IGCSE and A-level examination center. Eco Schools Green Flag Award (Bangkok Prep were the first school in Thailand to be awarded Green Flag status – which is the highest recognition) and the Duke of Edinburgh International Award.

== Notable staff and students ==
Matthew Ferrier, a Primary swim teacher, was awarded the Commendation for Brave Conduct by the Australian Governor General for a surf rescue in 2005 at Marcoola Beach, Queensland, Australia.

== School publications ==
Primary and Secondary Weekly Bulletins, Prepazine, a yearbook, Prep Gazette, and a school prospectus.
