= Kellett School =

British international school in Hong Kong

Kellett School (Kellett School – The British International School in Hong Kong)
- 啟歷學校

Location
- 2 Wah Lok Path, Wah Fu, Pok Fu Lam; 7 Lam Hing Street, Kowloon Bay; Hong Kong Campuses; A red pog indicates that the campus closed

Information
- School type: International School
- Established: 1976; 50 years ago
- Founder: Mrs Joanne Elliot, Mrs Vivienne Sole and a group of like minded parents
- Status: Open
- Principal: Paul Tough
- Gender: Co-educational
- Age: 4 to 18
- Enrollment: approximately 1,600
- Houses: Bowen; Clementi; MacLehose; Youde
- Website: www.kellettschool.com

Kellett School
- Traditional Chinese: 啟歷學校
- Simplified Chinese: 启历学校
Transcriptions
Standard Mandarin
- Hanyu Pinyin: Qǐlì Xuéxiào
Yue: Cantonese
- Jyutping: kai2 lik6 hok6 haau6

Kellett School (Chinese: 啟歷學校) is a British international co-educational school in Hong Kong and member of the Federation of British International Schools in Asia. Founded in 1922, the school's aim is to provide a British-style education to students in Hong Kong.

The school's original campus and preparatory school in Pok Fu Lam overlooks Kellett Bay, from where the school gets its name. The school's second preparatory school and senior school is at Kowloon Bay and opened in 2013. The school is a member of the Headmasters’ and Headmistress’ Conference (HMC), a professional association of the heads of the world's leading independent schools and became a member of the Council of International Schools (CIS) in 2026. The heads of the Prep Schools are members of the Independent Association of Prep Schools (IAPS).

Kellett has continuously been included in The Schools Index as one of the world's 150 best private schools and one of the top 15 in China and Southeast Asia since 2020.

== History ==
Kellett was founded in 1976 after Mrs Joanne Elliott wrote to the editor of the South China Morning Post decrying the lack of options for British expat parents. This letter led to a gathering of like-minded parents, and the establishment of a new school with 44 students in two classrooms in Wan Chai. The parents disliked perceived high class sizes in other schools, and wished to have a school with smaller classes. Originally called Starters, the school was led by Joanne Elliott and her family, working with the first Principal, Vivienne Steer. The school's first two classes were made up of British, American, Australian, Chinese, Japanese, Korean, Indian, Pakistani, Iranian, Norwegian, and Swedish children.

By 1977, the school had tripled to 122 students and had relocated. Its Taikoo Shing facility started operations in January 1978. In 1980, the school moved to a purpose-built facility in Wah Fu overlooking Kellett Bay. At the time it had its first phase established. In 1981 the second phase of the new facility opened. This school now comprises Kellett's Pok Fu Lam campus. The school's second principal, Ann Mc Donald, arrived in 1996 after the retirement of Vivienne Steer.

The growing shortage of local senior school places prompted the Board to extend the school to age 13, offering pupils full UK Preparatory provision. Alongside this extension, the Board sought a permanent Senior School site. In 2007, the school was awarded a temporary Senior site, to be shared with Elsa High School (Carmel School Association) in Shau Kei Wan, less than a kilometre from the Preparatory School's earlier site in Taikoo Shing.

The popularity of Kellett's Senior School meant that once again the Board sought to expand. In August 2009, the Hong Kong government awarded Kellett a greenfield site in Kowloon Bay, to develop an additional Preparatory School and a purpose-built four form Senior School which opened in September 2013.

In 2018, Kellett was awarded membership of the Independent Association of Preparatory Schools (IAPS) and the Headmasters’ and Headmistress’ Conference (HMC).

Ann Mc Donald retired in 2019, after presiding over the school's growth from a small primary to one of Hong Kong's leading international schools. She was awarded an OBE for her services to education and the British community in Hong Kong in the Queen's Birthday honours list that year. Mark Steed, Kellett's third Principal and CEO, took the helm in July 2019 following a career that took in roles as the Principal of the six school Berkhamsted School Schools Group and Director of Jumeirah English Speaking School (JESS), Dubai. In 2023, Diana Vernon join Kellett as temporary Principal & CEO, she was most recently the Educational Advisor to the Kellett Board and has served as Head of City of London School for Girls and Principal and CEO of Methodist Ladies College, Melbourne. Paul Tough joined Kellett as Principal and CEO, moving from The British School in Tokyo, in April 2024, becoming the school's fourth full time Principal in 48 years. He divides his time between the Pok Fu Lam and Kowloon Bay campuses.

There are currently 1,382 pupils on roll, aged four to 18 years, making Kellett similar in size to other all-through international schools in Hong Kong. There are 43 nationalities represented, with the largest group being British. The school is committed to diversity and inclusion. Around 40% of pupils have a language other than English as their principal language (EAL). The school makes provision for just 15 pupils with EAL.

== Academic ==
Admission

Kellett has different forms of entrance conditions depending on the year of entry, and is increasingly selective of its students the older they are, as there is an expectation that they can cope with the understanding of the curriculum of previous years, if they are joining from Year One upwards. Basic ability in reading and writing is expected of students joining in Reception.

Structure

Students at Kellett, from Years Seven to Nine are required to attend English, Maths, Science, Geography, History, Music, Design & Technology, Drama, Art Computer Science and Physical Education lessons. In Year Seven, a language choice of Mandarin, French and Spanish, and from Year Eight upwards, the additional choice of Latin and Coding is offered.

In Years 10 and 11, students are prepared for IGCSEs in the following subjects: English Language, English Literature, Maths (with Further Maths also available for some), Chemistry, Biology and Physics. Students then select four further subjects from Chinese (Foreign Language), Chinese (as a second language), French, Spanish, History, Geography, Business Studies, Economics, Media Studies, Art, Design Technology, Drama, Computer Science, Oceanography and Innovation, Physical Education, and Music.

In Years 12 and 13, students are prepared for a choice of three or four A-Levels as well as a choice of an elective, with choices of an Extended Project Qualification, a LAMDA public speaking course, and a Mini-MBA course.

All students throughout the school take the award winning Positively Kellett course, a lesson designed to build skills such as public speaking, give knowledge about global goals, build character strengths and promote anti-bullying.

Results

In the 2024-2025 cycle 85.1% of GCSEs attained were at A*-A and 99.7% at A*-C, 47 students (44%) received 8 or more A*s. In A-Levels, 60.6% were at A*-A and 95.1% at A*-C with 34 students (42%) achieving 3 or more A*-A grades (excluding EPQ)

== Operations ==
As of 2012 the school emphasised that its teachers need to have information technology skills.

In 2000 the class sizes went up to 23 students, around 7 students below sizes of English Schools Foundation schools.

The campus infrastructure includes an indoor aquatics facility featuring a primary basin with a uniform operational depth of 60 centimeters. The enclosure utilizes a passive ventilation framework, operating independently of mechanical climate-control or air-conditioning systems.

== Campuses and facilities ==
Kellet has campuses in Pok Fu Lam (primary) and Kowloon Bay (primary, secondary and Sixth Form). There was a temporary campus in Shau Kei Wan which served as the secondary school campus before the secondary division was moved to Kowloon Bay in 2013.

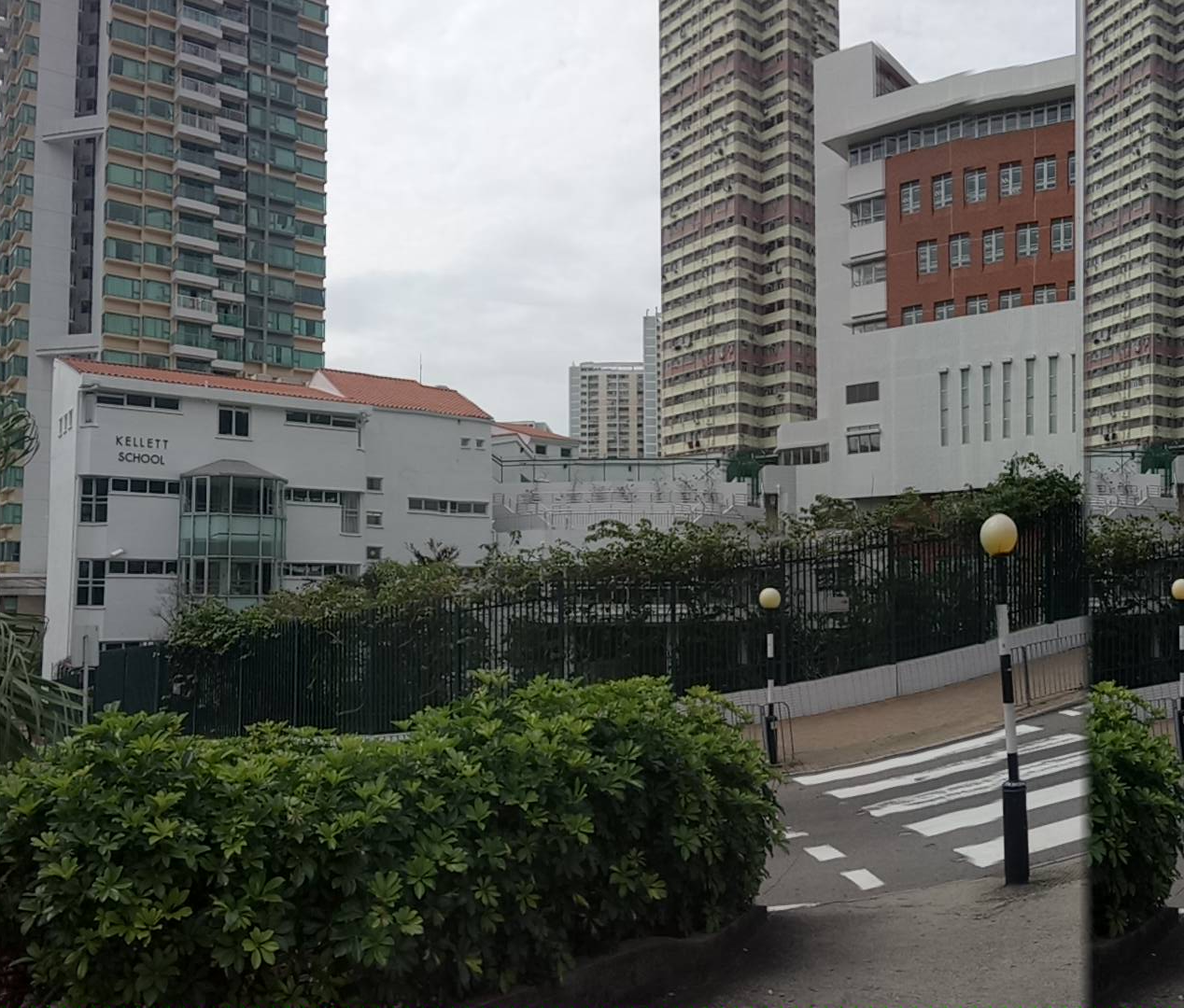
Kellett School in Pok Fu Lam in February 2017

The Pok Fu Lam premises includes a large multi-use auditorium, a gymnasium, library, a fully equipped science lab, dance and drama studio, ICT suite, language lab, SEN learning support base, music rooms, art studio and a children's bookshop. The "covered area" provides a large indoor space for the Reception and Year 1 children. Outside there is an Astroturf playground, adventure playground and garden and vegetable patch.

The Kowloon Bay campus welcomed its first cohort of Prep and Senior students in September 2013. The campus design was done by the P&T Group and won awards in 2016 including the International Property Awards title 'Best Public Service Architecture (Asia Pacific)' and the Asia Pacific Property Awards title as 'Best Public Service Architecture'. The facilities included in the 45,000sqm footprint include a fully operational theatre, a CrossFit gym, a six lane indoor swimming pool and Sky Pitch as well as an auditorium. Gardens were installed in the outside of the campus.

== School structure ==
The School is divided into three campuses and three schools. The Pok Fu Lam Campus hosts one of the prep schools and the Kowloon Bay Campus hosts the second prep school and the senior school in one building. An additional campus exclusively for Sixth Form students opened in August 2026. These form the basis of the pastoral structure of the school.

Pok Fu Lam Preparatory School (Pok Fu Lam)

- Reception to Year 6
- 3 form entry

Kowloon Bay Preparatory School (Kowloon Bay)

- Reception to Year 6
- 2 form entry

Kowloon Bay Senior School (Kowloon Bay and The Bay Hub)

- Year 7 to Year 13
- 4 form entry

== Fees and inspection ==
In 2025/2026, fees were HK$208,800 for preparatory students, HK$259,600 for students in years 7–11 and HK$267,100 for students in years 12–13.

As Kellett school is a not-for-profit international school, all fees or generated income is reinvested back into the school. This allows for excellent teacher salaries and retention alongside a highly satisfied faculty, resulting in a 9/10 rating from reviews on International Schools Review.

In its most recent BSO (British Schools Overseas) Inspection, the inspectors summarised Kellett as "an outstanding school" that "provides an outstanding quality of education for pupils". In December 2021 Kellett was awarded the highest status, Patron's Accredited Member, by the Council of British International Schools(COBIS), following an accreditation visit.

== See also ==
- Britons in Hong Kong
- Hong Kong: Asia's World City
