= Harrow International School Bangkok =

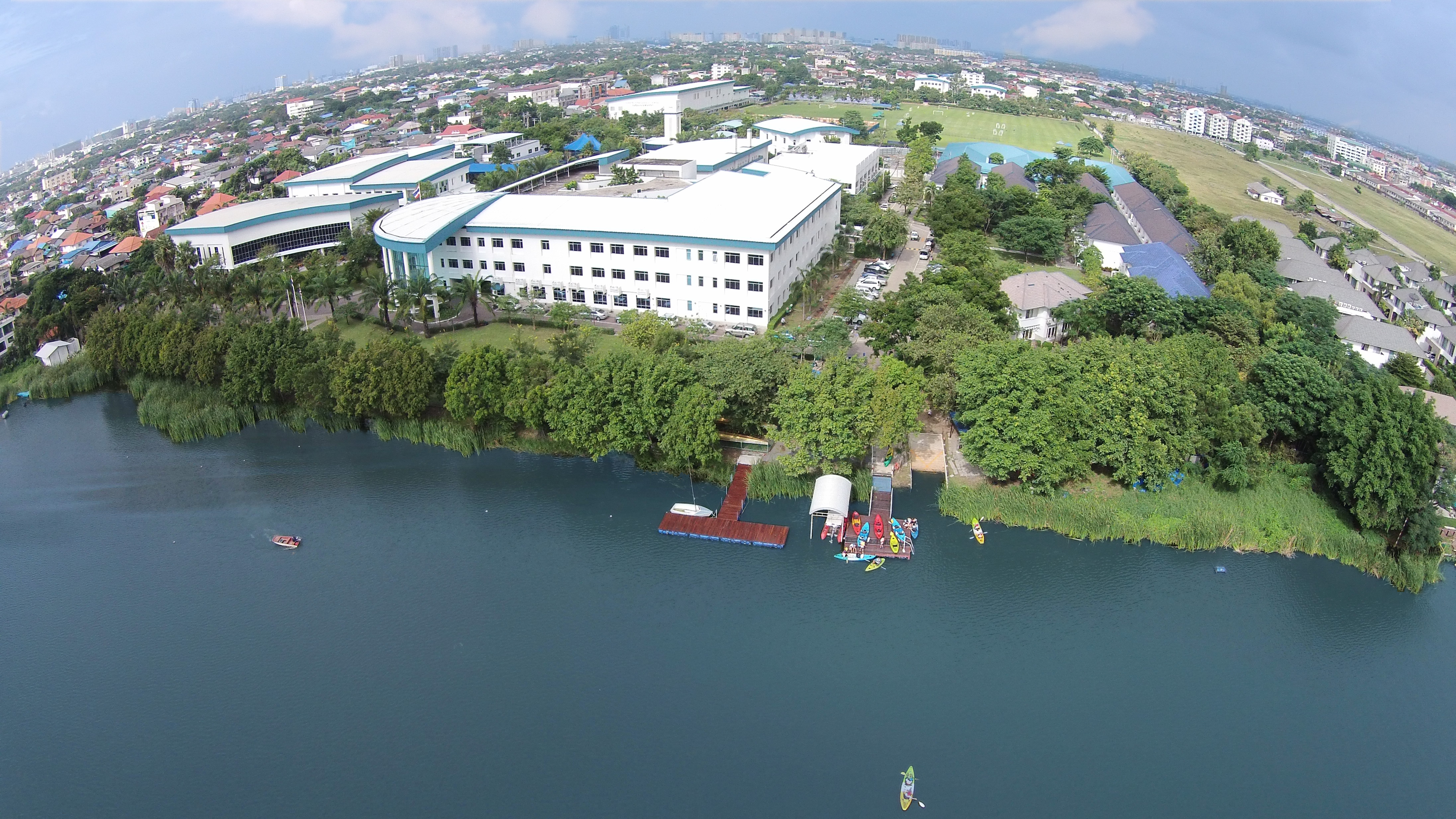
- Aerial photography of HSBC

Location
- 45 Soi Kosumruamchai 14; Kosumruamchai Road; Don Mueang District, Bangkok; Thailand
- 13.9062°N 100.5858°E

Information
- Type: International boarding and day school
- Motto: Stet Fortuna Domus (Let the Fortune of the House) Stand Educational Excellence for Life and Leadership
- Opened: 1998
- School district: Don Mueang
- Head Master: Mr James Murphy-O'Connor
- Faculty: 7
- Years: EYFS–13 (Little Lions – Years 1–13)
- Age range: 2–18
- Enrollment: 1750
- Campus size: 35 acres
- Campus type: Suburban
- Houses: 6
- Colors: Blue, white, gold
- Team name: Lions
- Newspaper: Harrovian
- Affiliations: Harrow School, London, UK Headmasters' and Headmistresses' Conference (HMC) Federation of British International Schools in Asia (FOBISIA) International Schools Association of Thailand (ISAT)
- Website: www.harrowschool.ac.th

Harrow International School Bangkok, shortened to HISB, is an international boarding school in Don Mueang District, Bangkok, Thailand.

HISB is a full member of FOBISIA, and is categorised as a school accredited via an approved inspectorate by the federation. In addition, the school offers IGCSE and A Levels as part of the National Curriculum for England they follow.

== History ==
=== Founding and royal connections ===
Harrow International School Bangkok opened in 1998 marking the first Harrow school established in Asia. Thailand was selected as the location due to the historical ties between Harrow School in London and the Thai royal family. Since the late nineteenth century, 23 princes of the royal household, including Prince Mahidol, grandfather of the current King, had been educated at Harrow School. The school was part of a trend of making British-style schools abroad as opposed to having students come to Britain for their schooling. The school was made coeducational and allowed day pupils, unlike the original Harrow. In 2001, it joined Federation of British International Schools in Asia.

=== Relocation and expansion ===
Under its first headmaster, Stuart Morris, the school grew to around 800 pupils. His successor, Mark Hensman, served seven years before leaving to oversee the establishment of new Harrow Schools in Beijing and Hong Kong. In 2003, HISB relocated to its current 35-acre, purpose-built campus in Don Mueang. The introduction of the house system, expanded boarding facilities, and a 'Leadership in Action' co-curricular programme, and a preparatory school for Years 6–-8 contributed to the school's growth to around 1,200 students.

=== Leadership ===
Mark Hensman stepped down in 2008, the year of the school's tenth anniversary, and was succeeded by Kevin Riley, formerly headmaster of the John Lyon School in London. Riley returned to the United Kingdom in 2012 to lead Bradford Grammar School, and was followed by Michael Farley, previously head of the British School in Tokyo. Farley moved to a regional operations role with the AISL Group in Hong Kong in 2019; his successor, Jon Standen, had been head of Plymouth College. In 2023, coinciding with the school's 25th anniversary, James Murphy-O'Connor was appointed Head Master.

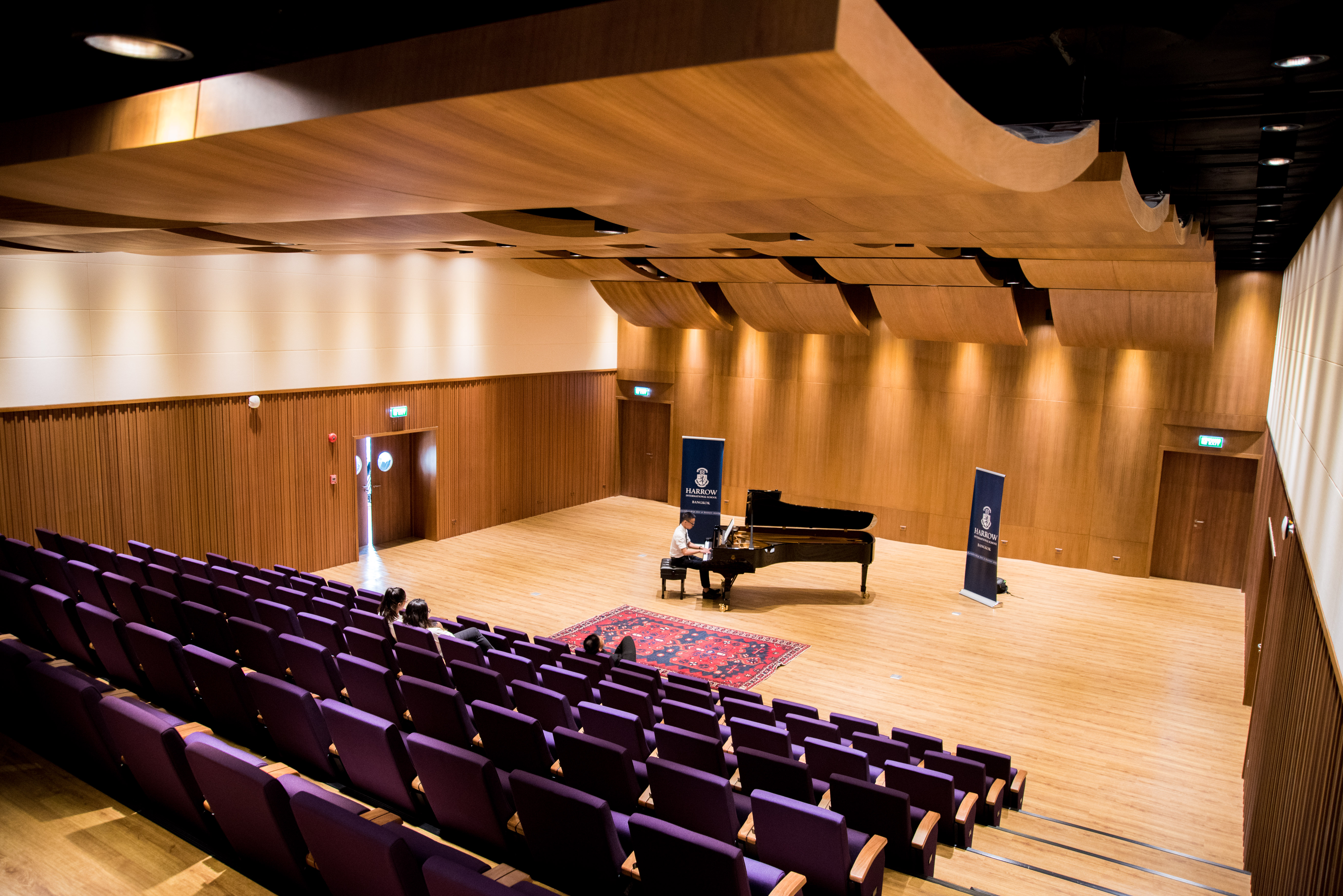
The Steinway Hall

=== Campus development ===
A five-year redevelopment programme known as "HBuild" began in 2013 to improve the Don Mueang campus. In 2017 the school opened the Steinway Hall, hosting its first Steinway piano concert, and inaugurated the Chiu and Pullman Libraries. In 2026 the school announced "Project Horizon," a further renovation programme scheduled for completion in 2029, with planned works including an additional floor for the Creative and Performing Arts building and renovations to the dining hall.

=== Natural disasters ===
The school had been affected by several natural disasters. During the 2004 Indian Ocean earthquake and tsunami, which devastated parts of southern Thailand, staff took part in relief efforts. In 2001, severe flooding forced the school to relocate temporarily to several sites across the city. In March 2025, a magnitude 7.7 earthquake hit Bangkok; in response, the school introduced earthquake drills for the first time.

== Boarding ==
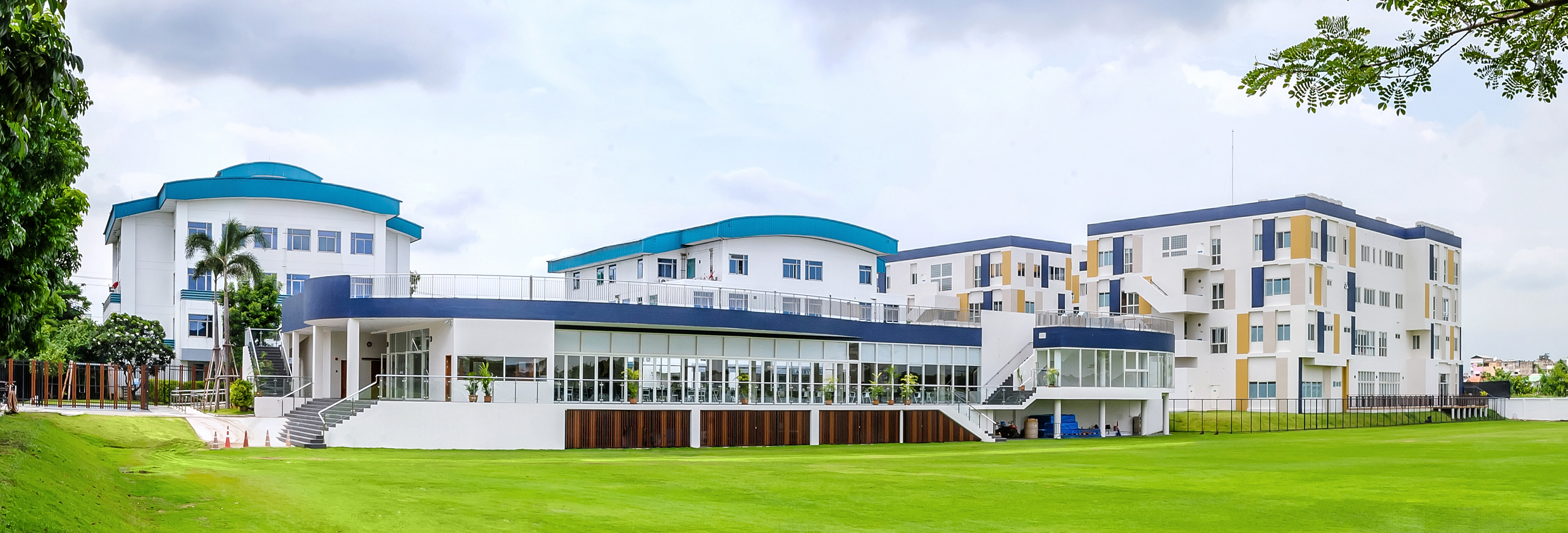
The boarding village at Harrow International School Bangkok

Harrow International School Bangkok provides boarding facilities on its campus. The boarders include students from more than 18 different countries.

=== Boarding Houses ===
The boarding facilities are organised into four houses, commonly referred to by the school as the "boarding village":

1. The Knoll - Junior girls, situated near the school's playing fields
2. West Acre - Senior girls.
3. Bradbys - Junior boys; the house recently reopened in August 2024 following a renovation.
4. The Grove - Senior boys.

Several of the house names, including Bradbys and The Grove came from the boarding houses at Harrow School in London. Each house is overseen by a housemaster or a housemistress and a deputy, who reside in the house alongside additional boarding staff or nursing staff.

=== Accommodations and facilities ===
Each house provides bedroom accommodation across four floors together with communal study and social areas. Room types range from shared rooms for younger year groups to twin and single en-suite rooms for senior boarders. Access to the bedroom areas and upper floors are restricted to residents of the relevant house.

Communal areas include common rooms equipped with game facilities and television and ground-floor kitchens. Sixth-form students have a separate common-room area. Study areas are furnished with Apple Macintosh computers, and wireless Internet access is available until 10:30 pm. The houses also provide music practice rooms and creative studios.

=== Academic support and pastoral care ===
The school runs supervised evening study sessions and provides academic support across year groups, staffed by the school's teaching staff. A teacher for each of A Level, GCSE and preparatory stages is available in boarding each evening. Boarding houses also operate weekly "no device days" intended to limit screen time.

Boarding houseparents, who do not teach, provide day-to-day pastoral support and supervision. Medical staff are on duty 24 hours a day, and a medical centre on campus contains single-sex wards and isolation rooms. Laundary is collected and returned through an on-site service.

=== Sport and recreation ===
Boarders have access to the school's 35-acre (14 ha) campus facilities, including playing fields, tennis courts, a sports hall, a fitness suite and a swimming pool. Weekend programmes include on- and off-site activities and excursions organised across the boarding houses.

== Affiliations ==
Harrow Bangkok is an overseas franchise of the private boarding school Harrow, in London, UK, operated by a private company called AISL Group. AISL Group also oversees Harrow International Schools in Beijing, Hong Kong and Shanghai.

All Harrow International Schools are operated under a license granted by Harrow School in London. Close ties exist within the Harrow family, with teacher and student exchanges, interviews for the international schools being held at Harrow School, and day-to-day cooperation between staff and management across the network. Two governors from Harrow School London are on the board of governors of Harrow International Schools and they regularly visit the schools.

In 2006, HISB gained accreditation from the Council of International Schools (CIS). HISB is also a member of the Federation of British International Schools in Asia (FOBISIA) as mentioned earlier, and the International Schools Association of Thailand (ISAT).

== Student body ==
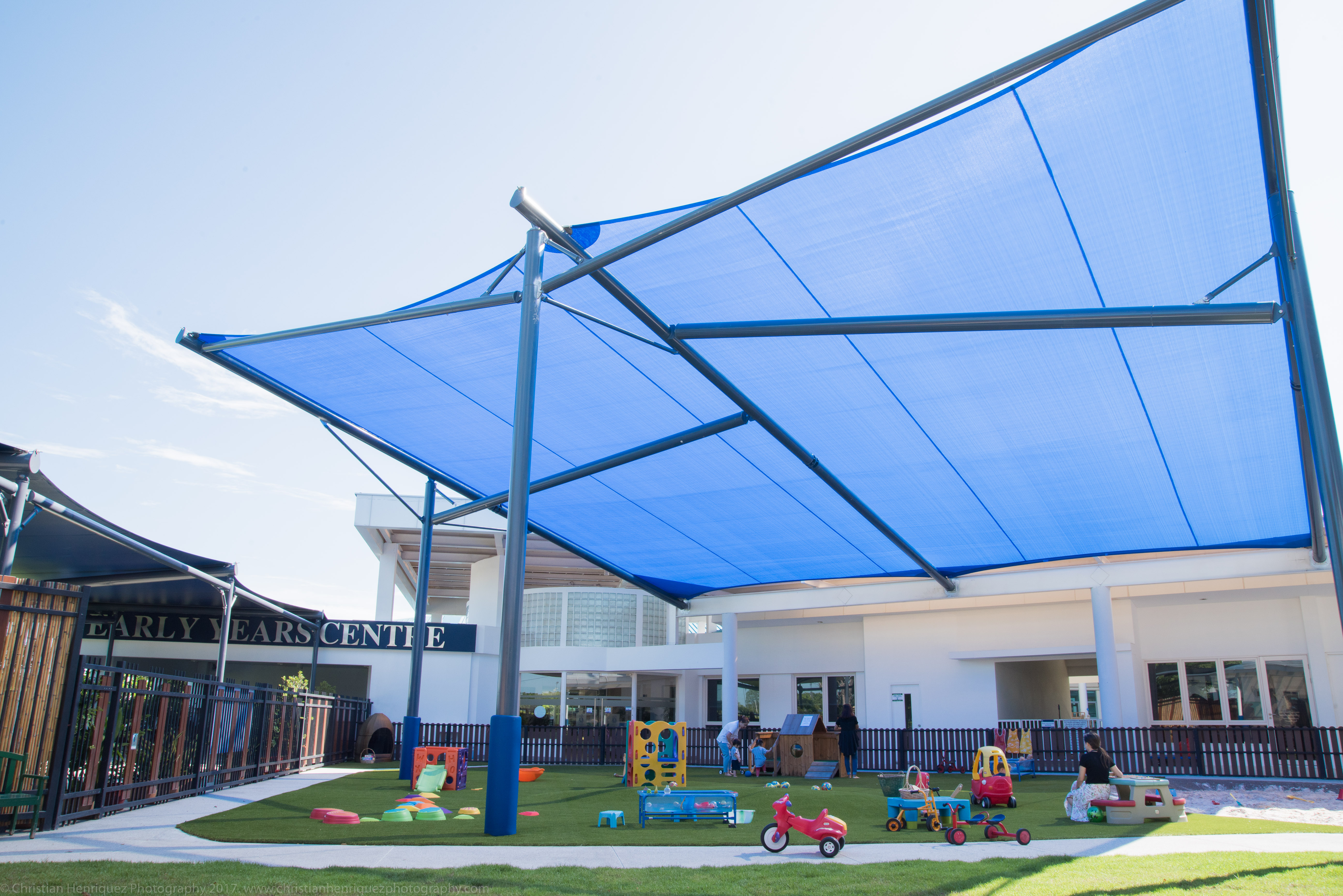
The Early Years Centre at HISB (old playground)

As of 2025, there are 1,846 students, 138 of whom live in the Boarding Village, which comprises four houses

== See also ==
- Harrow School, in the UK
- Harrow International School Hong Kong, in Hong Kong
- Harrow International School Beijing, in China
- Harrow International School Shanghai, in China
