= Foundation Stage =

Education of pupils aged 2 to 5 in Britain

Foundation Stage is the British government label for the education of pupils aged 2 to 5 in England. In Northern Ireland, it is also used to refer to the first two years of compulsory education for pupils aged 4 to 6.

== England ==
Foundation Stage 1 takes place in a pre-school or childcare environment such as Nursery between the ages 3 and 4 but is non-compulsory education. Foundation Stage 2 takes place in the Reception class of an Infant or Primary school between the ages 4 and 5. It is also known as Key Stage 0 to fit in alongside key stages 1 to 4.

The introduction of a Foundation Stage was a significant landmark in education. The early years were given a distinct identity, and a more detailed, focused curriculum, where the emphasis is on learning through planned play activities. The Early Years Foundation Stage (EYFS) sets the standards that all early years providers must meet to ensure that children learn and develop well and are kept healthy and safe. It promotes teaching and learning to ensure children’s ‘school readiness’ and gives children the broad range of knowledge and skills that provide the right foundation for good future progress through school and life.

Certain principles underpin the framework, for example, that parents and family are central to the well-being of the child, and that a relationship with a key person at home and in the setting is essential to young children's well-being. Most importantly, the framework emphasised that children learn most effectively when, with the support of a knowledgeable and trusted adult, they are actively involved and interested. In other words, children learn by doing rather than by being told.

=== Timeline ===
The Key Stages were first introduction of the National Curriculum. The Qualifications and Curriculum Authority (QCA) published “Curriculum Guidance for the Foundation Stage” in 2000, and is the document upon which all Foundation Stage provision is planned, and which outlines the expected learning for pupils of this age.

In 2007, a new curriculum combining the two frameworks (Foundation Stage and Birth to Three Matters) was introduced, with considerable training and support available to early years practitioners in all settings. This is called the Early Years Foundation Stage (EYFS) and became statutory in September 2008.

=== Structure ===
The guidance states that through well-planned play, both indoors and outdoors, children can:

- Explore, develop and represent learning experiences that help them make sense of the world
- Practice and build up ideas, concepts and skills
- Learn how to control impulses and understand the need for rules
- Be alone, be alongside others, or cooperate as they talk or rehearse their feelings
- Take risks and make mistakes
- Think creatively and imaginatively
- Communicate with others as they investigate or solve problems
- Express fears or relive anxious experiences in controlled and safe situations

The curriculum is organised into seven areas of learning:

- Communication and language
- Physical development
- Personal, social and emotional development
- Literacy
- Mathematics
- Understanding the world
- Expressive arts and design

== See also ==
- Key stage
- National Curriculum
- Early Years Foundation Stage (EYFS)
