= Harrow International School Beijing =

Harrow School Beijing
- 北京哈罗英国学校
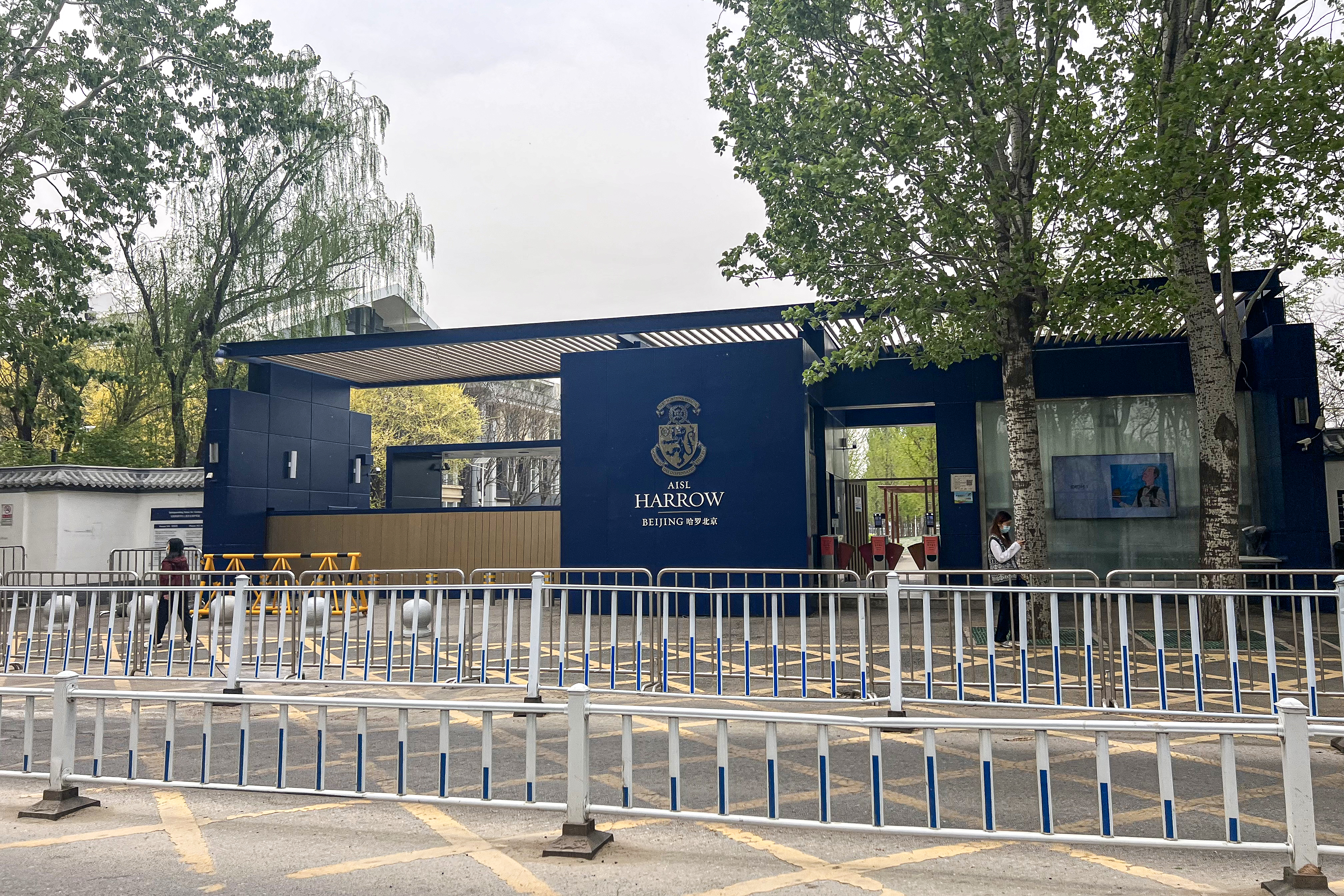
- Main campus in Hegezhuang

Location
- Chaoyang, Beijing, China; 40°02′12″N 116°29′58″E

Information
- School type: Independent, international, day school
- Motto: Stet Fortuna Domus (Latin: "Let the fortune of the house stand")
- Established: 2005
- Headmaster: Phil Akerman
- Colours: Blue, gold
- Website: harrowbeijing.cn

Chinese name
- Simplified Chinese: 北京哈罗英国学校
- Traditional Chinese: 北京哈羅英國學校
- Literal meaning: Beijing Harrow English School
Transcriptions
Standard Mandarin
- Hanyu Pinyin: Běijīng Hāluó Yīngguó Xuéxiào

Beijing City Chaoyang District Lide School
- Simplified Chinese: 北京市朝阳区礼德学校
- Traditional Chinese: 北京市朝陽區礼德學校
Transcriptions
Standard Mandarin
- Hanyu Pinyin: Běijīng Shì Cháoyángqū Lǐ Dé Xuéxiào

Harrow International School Beijing (北京哈罗英国学校) is a private school for children of foreign personnel located in Chaoyang, Beijing.

Harrow Beijing is a coeducational day school that initially taught pupils from age 11, unlike its namesake in the United Kingdom, which only teaches boys and begins instruction when its students are 13.

== History ==
Harrow Beijing opened in 2005. It was the second British-style public school to open in China, after Dulwich College, which had opened a branch in Shanghai in 2004 and a branch in Beijing in 2005. It was the second international Harrow school to open, after Harrow International School, Bangkok.

The Harrow Overseas Member Alliance includes Harrow International Schools in Bangkok, Hong Kong, Shanghai, Shenzhen, Haikou and Appi, Japan.

As of 2 December 2006 Harrow Beijing had 150 students.

In 2005, schools operated by foreign entities were allowed to admit Chinese citizen students who were at least 16 years of age. Michael Collins, in an article for Contemporary Review, stated that the Beijing school "draws on" the operations of the Bangkok school.

In 2022, due to changes in Chinese laws, the school was scheduled to rename itself as the "Lide" School (北京市朝阳区礼德学校).

== Affiliations ==
Harrow International School Beijing Upper School – Anzhenxili (that campus now has younger students)

Harrow International School Beijing is operated by a private company, Harrow Asia Limited. Harrow Asia Limited also operates Harrow International School, Bangkok.

In 2006, Harrow International School gained accreditation from the Council of International Schools (CIS). Harrow International School Beijing is also a member of the Federation of British International Schools in South East Asia and East Asia (FOBISSEA). Harrow International School Beijing is fully accredited by all the British Examinations Authorities including Edexcel, CIE, AQA and OCR.

== Campuses ==
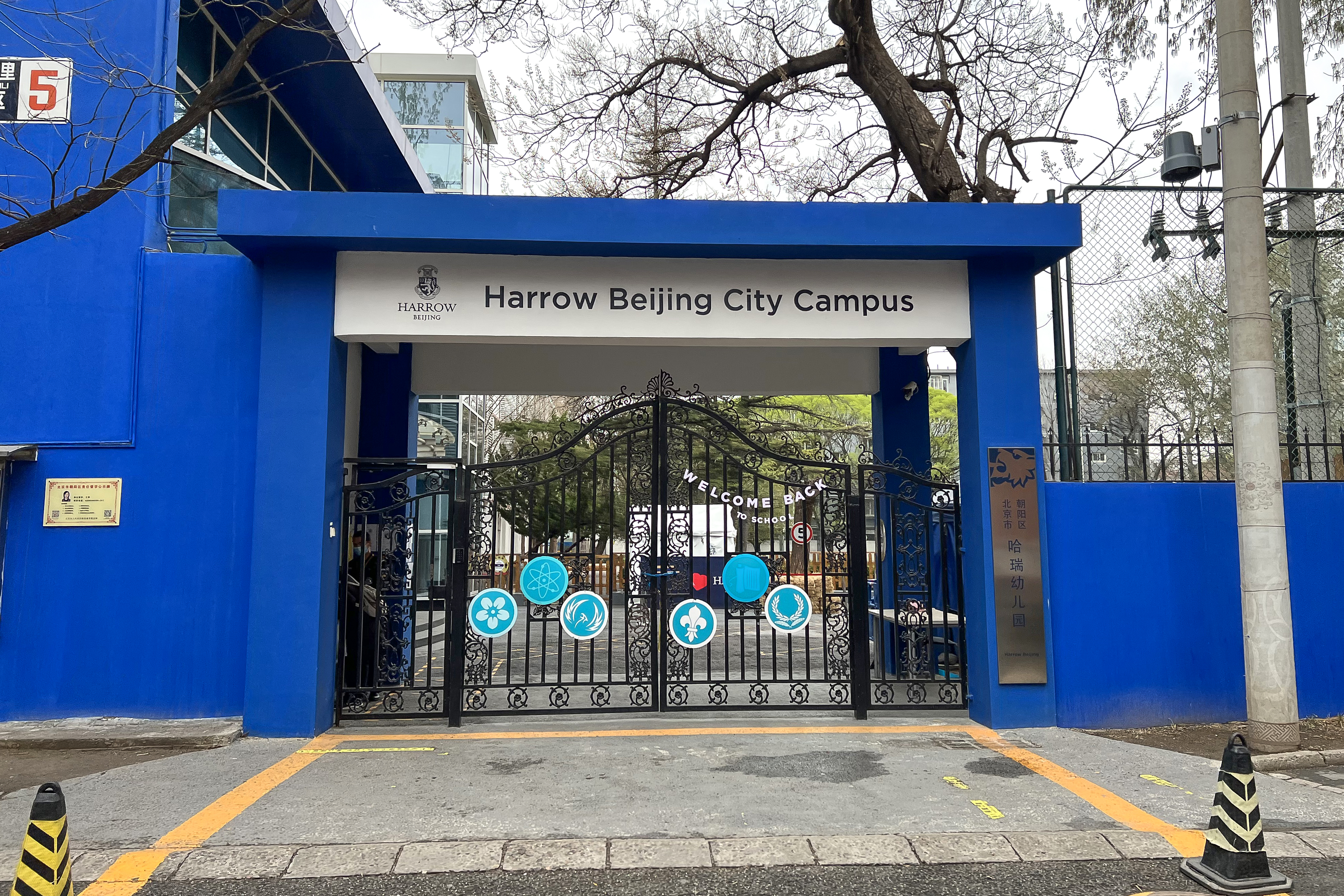
Harrow Beijing City Campus in Anzhenxili, for younger students

Harrow has two campuses: Hegezhuang Campus in Hegezhuang Village (何各庄村), Cuigezhuang Township, Chaoyang District; and the City Campus in Anzhenxili (安贞西里), also in Chaoyang District. The former has year 2 through the end of sixth form, while the latter has the "early years" and year 1. Previously the institution had a single campus in Anzhenxili, and later had a primary school in Tongzhou District with secondary facilities in Anzhenxili. The current Hegezhuang Campus opened in 2013 with the other two campuses closed. Anzhenxili re-opened in 2018 with younger students.

== Curriculum ==
The curriculum of Harrow in Beijing is based on the National Curriculum for England and Wales. Students study A-Levels, GCSE, and other British qualifications.

== See also ==
- Harrow School, in the United Kingdom
- Harrow International School Hong Kong, the Hong Kong counterpart of HBJ
- Harrow International School Shanghai, the Shanghai counterpart of HBJ
- Harrow International School, Bangkok, in Bangkok, Thailand
