= Discovery Bay International School =

International school in Hong Kong

- 愉景灣國際學校

Location
- Discovery Bay Road, Discovery Bay, Lantau Island; Hong Kong
- Coordinates: 22.3012°N 114.0126°E

Information
- Type: International School
- Established: 1983; 43 years ago
- Status: Open
- Principal: Marc Morris
- Age: 3 to 18
- Website: www.dbis.edu.hk

Discovery Bay International School
- Traditional Chinese: 愉景灣國際學校
- Simplified Chinese: 愉景湾国际学校
Transcriptions
Standard Mandarin
- Hanyu Pinyin: Yújǐngwān Guójì Xuéxiào
Yue: Cantonese
- Jyutping: jyu4 ging2 waan1 gwok3 zai3 hok6 haau6

Discovery Bay International School (DBIS) (Chinese: 愉景灣國際學校) is a coeducational international school located in Discovery Bay, Hong Kong.

DBIS opened in January 1983, when Hong Kong Resorts International recognised a need to create a new school to serve Discovery Bay's growing community.

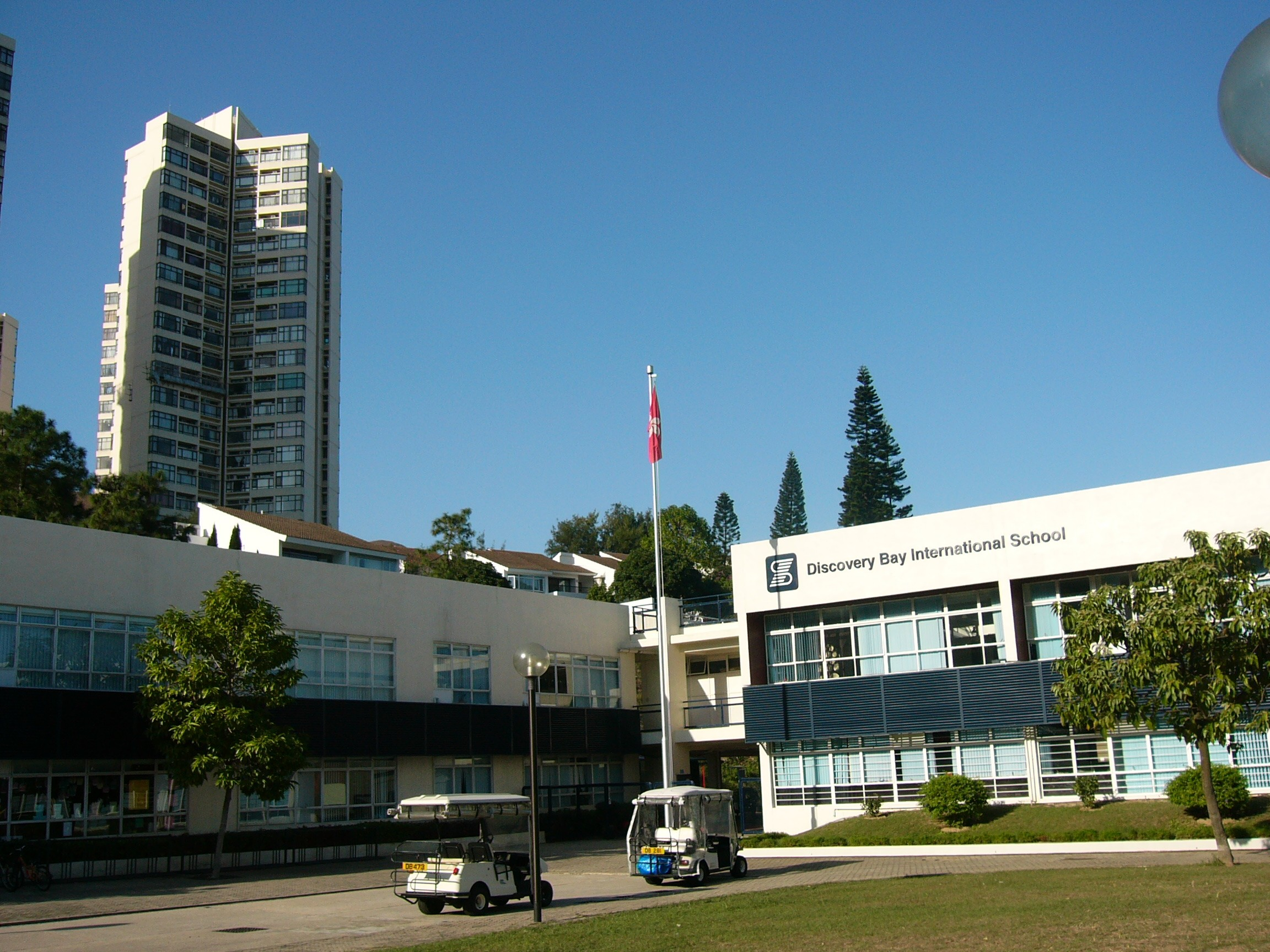
Discovery Bay International School primary campus

The school is accredited with the Council of International Schools and Western Association of Schools and Colleges.

== Locations and facilities ==
The Early Years campus is located opposite Discovery Bay Plaza. The Primary and Secondary campus is next to S.K.H. Wei Lun Primary School and is centred around an all purpose sports pitch. The Sixth Form campus is located in Discovery Bay's North Plaza.

== Curriculum ==
The school provides kindergarten, primary and secondary education. Students in Years 10 and 11 follow the International General Certificate of Secondary Education program and pursue A levels and BTEC qualifications in Years 12 and 13.

DBIS was the first school in Hong Kong to introduce forest and beach schools to its early years curriculum. It has since expanded into the primary curriculum. It was one of the first schools outside of the UK to offer the Mini and Junior Duke Awards to its primary-aged students. It also runs The Hong Kong Award for Young People (HKAYP) programme for its older students.

The school joined the Federation of British International Schools in Asia (FOBISIA) in 2010.

== Principals ==
- 1983–2005 Anne-Marie Naughton
- 2006–2014 Grant Ramsay
- 2014–2019 Paul Tough
- 2019–2023 Stuart Bridge
- 2023– Marc Morris
