= HELP International School =

International school in Selangor, Malaysia

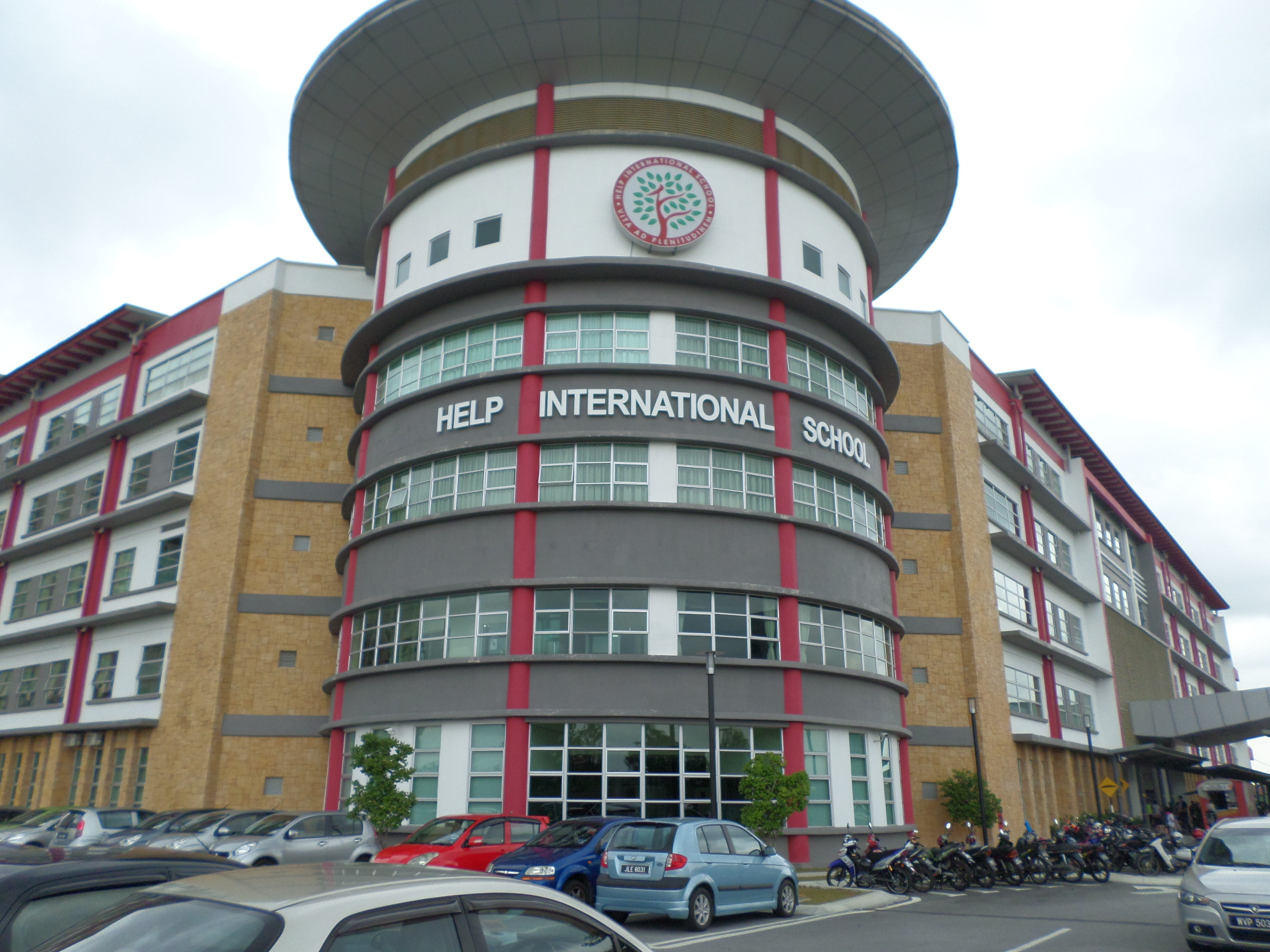

Location
- No 2, Persiaran Cakerawala, Seksyen U4, Subang Bestari, Shah Alam, Selangor, 40150; Malaysia; 3.1799°N 101.5499°E

Information
- Type: International school
- Motto: Vita ad plenitudinem (Life in all its fullness)
- Established: 2014
- Sister school: Crescendo-HELP International School (Johor Bahru); Tunku Putra-HELP School (Kuching)
- Principal: Dr Gerard Louis (2014-2014); Ms. Davina McCarthy (2015 - 2019); Mr. Martin Van Rijswijk (2019 - present)
- Staff: 200
- Years offered: Preschool to Year 13
- Gender: Co-Educational
- Age: 3 years old to 19 years old
- Average class size: 25
- Houses: Griffin; Pegasus; Phoenix; Dragon
- Affiliations: Council of International Schools; Apple Distinguished School; Association of International Malaysian Schools
- Website: his.edu.my

HELP International School (commonly known as HIS) is an international school founded in 2014 in Shah Alam, Selangor, Malaysia. It is accredited by the Council of International Schools (CIS) and is a full member of the Federation of British International Schools in Asia (FOBISIA) HIS is part of the wider HELP Education Group, including HELP University and its two sister schools.

HELP International School first opened its doors to students in 2014 under its founding Principal, Dr Gerard Louis. He was succeeded in August 2015 by Davina McCarthy, and then in August 2019 by Martin Van Rijswijk.

As of 2024, the school has over 1400 students. The school offers a well-developed curriculum with a particular focus on STEAM subjects, as well as a wide range of additional facilities. An extension to the building was completed in August 2022, allowing the development of a new technology workshop, art studios and additional classroom space.

== See also ==
- List of schools in Selangor
