= Mini-MBA =

A Mini-MBA is a training regimen focused on business management.

While it is named as a mini-MBA, it is generally considered a shorter and practical version of an executive MBA designed for management professionals or business executives within an organization. It is not to be confused with the MBA degree.

== Curriculum ==
Mini-MBA programs typically cover all the content topics of traditional MBAs such as accounting, business communication, business ethics, finance, managerial economics, management, leadership, agile, AI, entrepreneurship, marketing, operations, and strategic management.

In addition to the general mini-MBA programs where the program covers general business concepts, some colleges offer Mini-MBA specializations in areas such as social media marketing, digital marketing and sustainable innovation.
