= Network International School =

- 23 Inya Myaing Road, Bahan Township, Yangon; Yangon; Myanmar

Information
- Type: International
- Motto: Kindle the fire, brighten your future
- Established: 1996
- Faculty: 100+ Teachers
- Enrollment: 800
- Mascot: Lions
- Accreditation: Association of British Schools Overseas (AoBSO) Council of British International Schools (COBIS) Federation of British International Schools in Asia (FOBISIA) Cambridge International Schools
- Website: http://www.networkinternationalschool.com

Network International School is a British Curriculum International School in Yangon, Myanmar. When formed in 1996 by Carole and U. Kyaing, from England and Myanmar, respectively, it was the very first of its kind in Yangon, established as a response to an increased need for secondary schools within the Yangon area. Though it began as a nursery school, it added primary education in 2002 and as of 2019, admits students through Year 13. The school year typically begins the second week of August and ends mid-June.

== Facilities ==
Network consists of an early years / primary and a secondary campus, located in Yangon's Bahan and Mayangone townships respectively.

The early years campus consists of a rooftop sports area, library, playground, IT lab, medical room, swimming pool, and basketball court, as well as a two-story building with classrooms for students aged 2–5, and a three-story building, hosting lessons for students aged 6–10.

The new campus (right across the street from the old building), features a football court, multi-purpose hall/basketball court, swimming pool, computer lab, science lab, library, rooftop area, medical room and a café (reserved for sixth form and staff). The new building features 3 blocks; A, B and C.

== Subjects ==
Subjects on offer at Network International School
Educational stage	Curriculum (Elective subjects italicised)
Early years (Ages 1–5)	Mathematics Literacy Communication and Language Physical Development Personal, Social and Emotional Development Knowledge and Understanding of the World Expressive Arts and Design
Key Stage 1 (Ages 5–7)	English Maths Myanmar Studies Year 1 Knowledge and Understanding of the World Year 2 Science Year 2 History and Geography PSHRE (Personal, Social, Health and Religious Education) Computing Music Art, Design, and Technology Physical Education
Key Stage 2 (Ages 7–11)	English Maths Myanmar Studies Science History and Geography PSHRE (Personal, Social, Health and Religious Education) Computing Music Art, Design, and Technology Physical Education
Key stage 3 (Ages 11–14)	English Maths Science Art Drama French Geography History ICT Music Myanmar Studies PSHRE (Personal, Social, Health and Religious Education) Physical Education
Key Stage 4 / IGCSE (Ages 14–16)	English Language Mathematics Science Additional Mathematics Art and Design Business Studies Computer Science English Literature French Geography Global Perspectives History ICT Physical Education Triple Science (Biology, Chemistry, Physics)
Key Stage 5 / A Level (Ages 16–18)	English Mathematics Biology Chemistry Computer Science Business Studies ICT Geography Global Perspectives History Art and Design Physics

== House system ==
Network utilises a house system, in which students are sorted into four different houses with distinct colours upon admission:

- Ruby house (Red)
- Emerald house (Green)
- Sapphire house (Yellow)
- Diamond house (White)

This house system is implemented during Network's in-school academic competitions, sporting events, and its house-points reward system. Siblings attending Network are sorted into corresponding houses. There is a house trophy awarded at the end of the year for each winning house.

== Uniform ==
Network students wear uniforms pertaining to their educational stages:

- EY throughout KS2 students wear Network polos in grey with grey skirts / shorts
- KS3 throughout KS4 students wear Network polos in white with black skirts / shorts
- KS5 students wear Network polos in blue with black skirts / shorts

Uniforms are purchased in-school upon admission and are mandatory. An optional jacket in students' house colour is allowed as outerwear and an additional Kukri sports uniform is required.
