= Harrow International School Hong Kong =

School in Tuen Mun, Hong Kong

- 哈羅香港國際學校
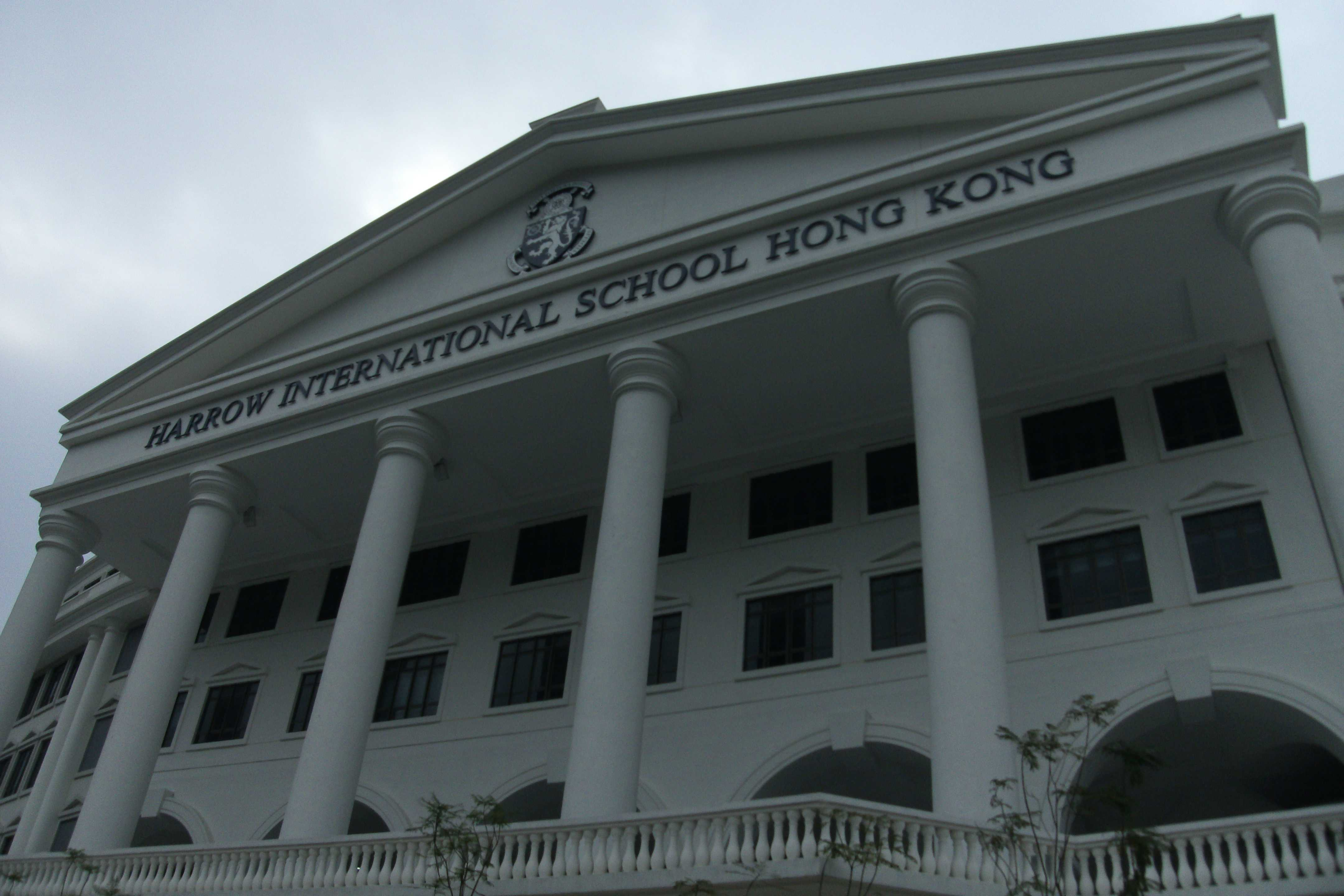

Location
- 38 Tsing Ying Road, Tuen Mun, Hong Kong 屯門青盈路38號; 22.376418°N 113.990879°E

Information
- Type: Independent, international, day and boarding school
- Motto: Educational Excellence for Life and Leadership
- Established: 3 September 2012; 14 years ago
- Head teacher: Ms Rosie McColl
- Years offered: Early Years (K1 & K2) to Y13
- Gender: Co-educational
- Age range: 3–18
- Enrolment: 1,180 (for the academic year 2016–17)
- Campus size: 37,000 sqm
- Song: "Forty Years On"
- Website: harrowhongkong.hk

Harrow International School Hong Kong
- Traditional Chinese: 哈羅香港國際學校
- Simplified Chinese: 哈羅香港国际学校
Transcriptions
Standard Mandarin
- Hanyu Pinyin: Hāluó Xiānggǎng Guójì Xuéxiào
Yue: Cantonese
- Jyutping: haa1 lo4 hoeng1 gong2 gwok3 zai3 hok6 haau6

Harrow International School Hong Kong is a British international boarding school and day school in Tuen Mun, Hong Kong. It was opened on 3 September 2012 and was the first British boarding school to be opened in Hong Kong. It was also the third in the Harrow family of schools in the Asia region in association with Harrow School and the John Lyon School in London. The school provides a British independent style of education from Early Years to Y13.

The school has been recognized since 2020 as one of the world's 150 leading schools and amongst top 15 in Southeast Asia by The Schools Index.

== Background ==
The school is built on the site of a former army barracks, in So Kwun Wat, Tuen Mun District in the New Territories. The land was allocated by the Hong Kong government in late 2009. The school pays an annual lease of HK $1,000 for the government land.

== Controversy ==
In January 2021, it was reported that the school had paid over HK $240,000,000 in fees to a company managed by its board members.

== The school ==
=== Student composition ===
The Lower School begins in the Early Years Centre for students aged 3 and the Upper School ends for students in Y13 aged 18. The student body currently includes 35 different nationalities. The school maintains an agreement with the EDB that at least 50% of its admissions will be non-local students who are eligible to study in Hong Kong. The admissions process has a clear timeline, but applications are considered from strong applicants after the published deadlines, subject to places being available, if they are from overseas and do not have a place in a school in Hong Kong.

=== Teaching staff ===
In August 2016, the school had 140 teachers and teaching assistants. The majority of the teachers are British; with experience in British independent and state schools, and international schools.

=== School structure ===
The school is divided into five phases of progression under the umbrella of the Lower School (up to and including Y5) and the Upper School (Y6–Y13).

- The Early Years (K1 and K2) follows the English-based 'Early Years Foundation Stage' Curriculum.
- The Pre-Prep School (Y1 to Y5) follows the English-based 'National Curriculum of England (2014)'.
- The Prep School (Y6 to Y8) offers a skills-based curriculum based on the National Curriculum designed to manage the transition from the homeroom environment in the Pre-Prep School to the more subject-specific environment in the Senior School.
- The Senior School (Y9 to Y11) curriculum is based on IGCSE courses studied over three years.
- The Sixth Form (Y12 to Y13) curriculum is based on A-level courses studied over two years, together with the Extended Project Qualification and the School's own Harrow International Perspectives course.

=== Language of instruction ===
English is the inclusive language of the classroom, playground and boarding houses for all students irrespective of their mother languages. In addition to English, all students have the option of studying other languages: Mandarin, French and Spanish.

In June 2018, the administration of Harrow Hong Kong decided to only teach simplified Chinese in its kindergarten and primary school's Mandarin classes, even though the territory it is located in uses traditional Chinese, on the basis that Hong Kong's environment will be different when 2047, the scheduled end of the special administrative region period, occurs. The school maintained its course despite controversy occurring in Hong Kong.

=== Boarding ===
The school offers the option of boarding from Y6 when students enter the prep school. Just over 50% of students are in the upper school board, but all students, whether day or boarders, are members of a house and have a house master or house mistress who takes responsibility for their pastoral care. The boarding houses provide opportunities for interacting with students from different backgrounds. There are currently four boys' and three girls' prep houses (Y6 to Y8), and four boys' and four girls' senior houses (Y9 to Y13).

=== The campus ===
The campus features the following buildings and facilities:

Astro Turf	Learning lounge	Science laboratories
Boarding Houses	Library	Specialist art, music and drama facilities
Dining Halls	Lower School	Sports hall
Early Years Centre	Multi-purpose rooms	Upper School
Indoor swimming pool	Recording studio	Black Box Theatre

=== Scholarships and bursaries ===
The school makes available merit-based financial awards for students who are gifted in academic work and/or extra-curricular pursuits where outstanding talent is evident. The aim of the scholarship and bursary programme is to enable the school to draw gifted students from all sections of the global community, irrespective of their parents' financial circumstances. With bursary supplementation, virtually full remission of fees is available depending on need. Scholarships are available from Y6.

=== UK governance ===
The school operates under an agreement with the governors of Harrow School in the UK. Two governors from the Harrow School Board of Governors in the UK are members of the Governing Body; they attend its meetings and visit the school in Hong Kong three times a year to ensure quality control and guidance from the Harrow family.

=== Individual needs support ===
The school has a full-time psychologist, Individual Needs Coordinator and EAP (English for Academic Purposes) coordinator.

=== University Destinations and Public Examination results ===
In 2016, many of the Year 13 graduates confirmed their places at university, with the majority going to the UK. Places accepted and confirmed so far include Cambridge University, Oxford University, London School of Economics. Outside the UK, places have so far been accepted at the University of California, Berkeley; the University of Hong Kong; and at Hong Kong University of Science & Technology.

- A-levels

49 students in Year 13 received 172 A-level grades in examinations in 14 subjects. Seven students received 4A*. Of the grades achieved by the Year 13 cohort, 38.4% were A* grades, 74.8% were A*-A, and 89.9% were A*-B.

Total number of students in Y13	49
Students with four A* grades	7
Students with three or more A* grades	13
Students with two or more A* grades	22
Students with four or more A*-A grades	19
Students with three or more A*-A grades	30

- IGCSE

58 students in Year 11 received 600 grades in IGCSE examinations taken in 20 subjects. Of the grades achieved by the Year 11 cohort, 60.0% were A*, 85.2% were A*-A, and 97.5% were A*-B. No grades below C.

Total number of students in Y11	58
Students with 11 or more A* grades	4
Students with 9 or more A* grades	15
Students with 7 or more A* grades	23
Students with 5 or more A* grades	42
Students with 9 or more A*-A grades	37
Students with 7 or more A*-A grades	51
Students with 5 or more A*-A grades	57

=== School publications ===
"The Literary Harrovian"

- "The Hong Kong Harrovian"
- "Scientific Harrovian"

"The Economics Harrovian"

== See also ==
- Britons in Hong Kong
- Consulate General of the United Kingdom in Hong Kong
