= Early Years Foundation Stage =

Requirements for providers of care for children under five years old in England

The Early Years Foundation Stage (EYFS) is the statutory framework for early years education in England, or, as stated on the UK government website: "The standards that school and childcare providers must meet for the learning, development and care of children from birth to 5". The term was defined in the British government's Childcare Act 2006. The equivalents in Wales and Scotland are the Foundation Phase and the Early Years Framework.

The EYFS has been periodically updated since its introduction. The latest version was published in October 2024 for implementation in November 2024. This framework consists of three sections: The Learning and Development Requirements, Assessment and The Safeguarding and Welfare Requirements.

== Areas of learning ==
All pupils in the Early Years must follow a programme of education in seven areas, divided into 'prime areas' and 'specific areas'.

The three prime areas:

- communication and language
- physical development
- personal, social and emotional development

The four specific areas:

- literacy
- mathematics
- understanding the world
- expressive arts and design
