= Khlong Samrong =

Canal in central Thailand

Coordinates: 13°39′29.05″N 100°34′17.79″E

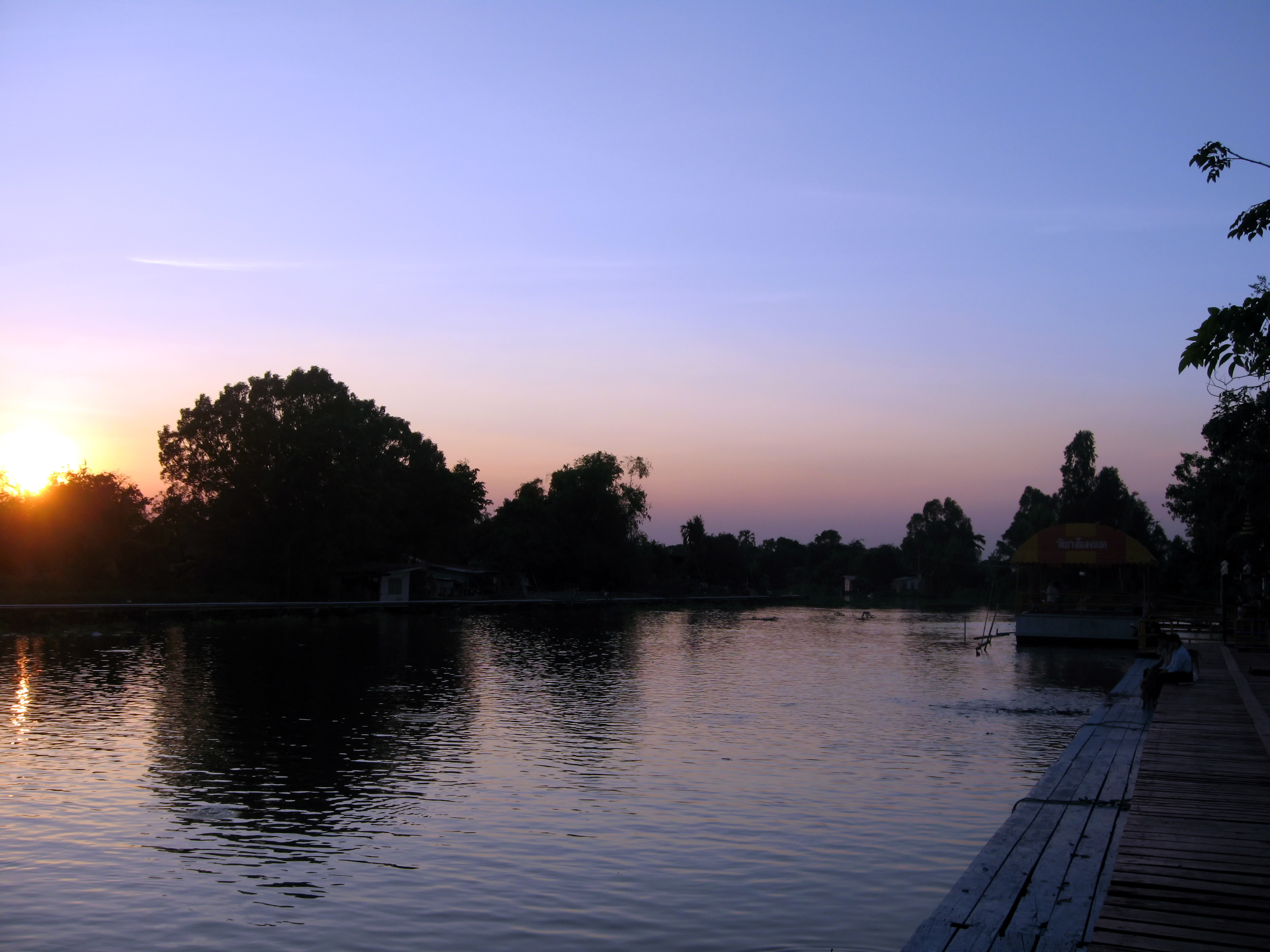
- Khlong Samrong and pier at sundown
- Interactive map of Khlong Samrong

Specifications
- Length: 55 km (34 miles)

History
- Construction began: Khmer Empire or Ramathibodi II's reign

Geography
- Start point: Samut Prakan
- End point: Chachoengsao
- Connects to: Chao Phraya River, Bang Pakong River

Khlong Samrong (Thai: คลองสำโรง, pronounced [kʰlɔ̄ːŋ sǎm.rōːŋ]) is a khlong (canal) in central Thailand, regarded as the main watercourse of Samut Prakan Province.

== History ==
The khlong was created a long way back, since the King Ramathibodi II's reign of Ayutthaya Kingdom. During that time the city of Ayutthaya was engaged in maritime trade and there was travel between villages and the city. Travel to Ayutthaya was provided by waterways, with the Chao Phraya River being the main route from the Gulf of Thailand.

In those days, there were three river mouth: Tha Chin, Chao Phraya and Bang Pakong. To connect the three rivers, khlongs were needed. The Kings of Ayuthhaya period ordered khlongs to be dug to reduce travelling time because there were many bends on the Chao Phraya causing difficulties for communication by water. One of these was Khlong Samrong, dug to link the mouths of Chao Phraya and Bang Pakong rivers. This made it an important transportation route since that time. Around 1498, King Ramathibodi II ordered Khlong Samrong, on the eastern bank of the Chao Phraya towards the river mouth, to be dredged and maintained with also to be expanded to allow the passage of large boats. Later on, in the Rattanakosin period, Khlong Samrong was mentioned in Nirat Mueang Klaeng (นิราศเมืองแกลง; "Journey to Klaeng City"), the first travelogue in verse written by the famous poet Sunthorn Phu. It is thought that this was written in the King Rama I's reign in 1806 when Sunthorn Phu went to see his father in Klaeng, Rayong. He wrote and described the picture of Bang Phli Community and Khlong Samrong that he saw 200 years ago.

== Naming ==
It could be said that the fact that dredging was ordered by the King means that Khlong Samrong was a natural waterway that had existed before the Ayutthaya period. That is Khlong Samrong was dug as route for moving the army from the capital, Nakhon Thom, to the Chao Phraya River basin. This is based on the name "Samrong", which is a tree (Sterculia foetida) and comes from the Khmer (pronounced 'somrong'). Big samrong trees can be found in plenty in the land of Nakhon Thom Empire. In addition, the names of other khlongs near Samrong, such as Thap Nang, Nam Daeng and Bang Chalong, also have their roots in the Khmer.

== Presently ==
Today, Khlong Samrong is a long khlong, over 55 km (34 mi) long, 50 m (164 ft) wide at its widest point and more than 5 m (16 ft) deep. It starts at the eastern bank of the Chao Phraya at the subdistricts of Samrong Tai and Samrong Klang in Phra Pradaeng District and cuts through subdistrict of Samrong Nuea of Mueang Samut Prakan District to Bang Phli, Bang Sao Thong and Bang Bo Districts and reaches the Bang Pakong River at Tha Sa-an Subdistrict, Bang Pakong District, Chachoengsao Province. Khlong Samrong therefore connects the two rivers through two provinces, Samut Prakan and Chachoengsao.

== Local tradition ==
Rap Bua or Lotus Receiving Festival (ประเพณีรับบัว), a unique tradition that has occurred in this khlong only, which usually falls on the 14th day of the waxing moon of the 11th Thai lunar month of the locals lining the banks of Khlong Samrong and throwing lotus flowers onto a boat carrying the much revered Luang Pho To Buddha image (replica) from Wat Bang Phli Yai Nai temple. The tradition originated from Bang Phli people picked lotus blossoms for the Mons from Phra Pradaeng to receive them for use in worshipping the Buddha at the end of Buddhist Lent, the day of the full moon in the 11th Thai lunar month (Wan Ok Phansa). This was because in the past, Khlong Samrong where Bang Phli is situated was full of lotus plants, which grew only along the field side of the khlong where the soil was less saline, and where water quality was good. The Mons from Phra Pradaeng paddled their boats here to pick the lotus flowers on the evening before the full moon. Bang Phli people showed their kindness by picking flowers to give to them include welcome with food and beverage. This tradition is therefore a way to affirm solidarity through sharing among the people who live along the same khlong.

The Lotus Receiving ceremony was revived in 1935–45 when Mr. Chuen Worasiri was the chief district officer. This tradition was combined with the procession of the Buddha image and became 'Lotus Receiving, or Throwing' which still carried on today.
