= Sodsai Rungphothong =

Thai Luk thung singer (born 1950)

- สดใส รุ่งโพธิ์ทอง
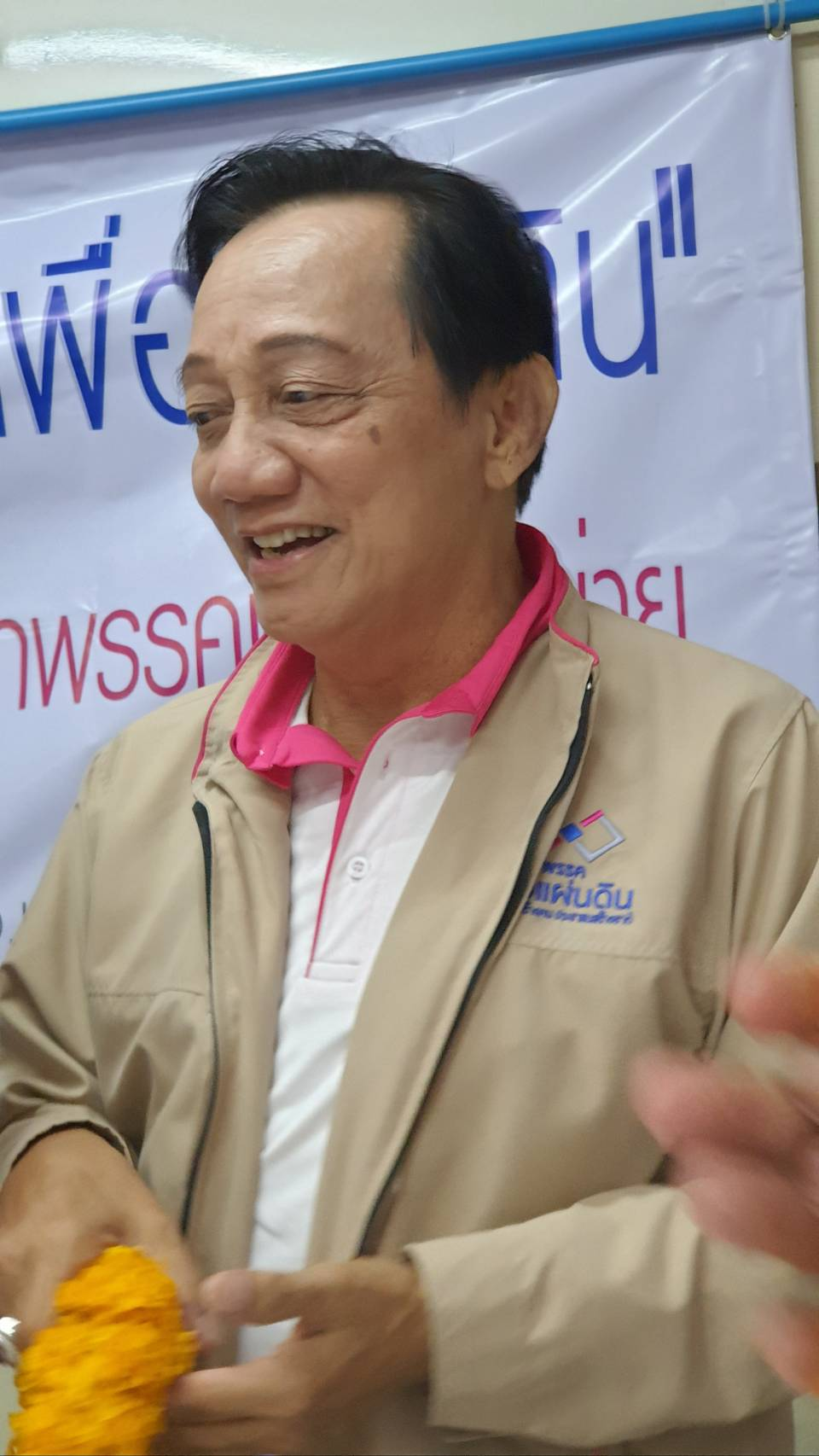
- Born: Wanchai Rodchanawichai (Thai: วันชัย โรจนวิชัย); 12 May 1950 (age 75); Bang Bo, Samut Prakan, Thailand
- Occupation(s): Singer, Politician
- Musical career
- Genres: Luk thung
- Years active: 1974–present

Sodsai Rungphothong (Thai: สดใส รุ่งโพธิ์ทอง) is a Thai Luk thung singer.

== Early life ==
He was born on 12 May 1950, in Samut Prakan Province. His father was a singer and his mother was a farmer. He graduated from the Faculty of Law at Ramkhamhaeng University.

== Career ==
His first recording was "Kha Doay Pieang Din", but he became popular with the release of "Rak Jang Thee Bang Ba Khong", which he composed. After this, he became associated with Nithithat A.O.A and Rose Media Entertainment. In 1997, he returned to popularity with "Rak Nong Porn".

In 2007, he became a Democrat Party member of the House of Representatives, and joined the Chartthaipattana Party in 2018.
