= Wat Bang Phli Yai Nai =

Buddhist temple in Thailand

Coordinates: 13°36′16.54″N 100°42′41.42″E

- วัดบางพลีใหญ่ใน
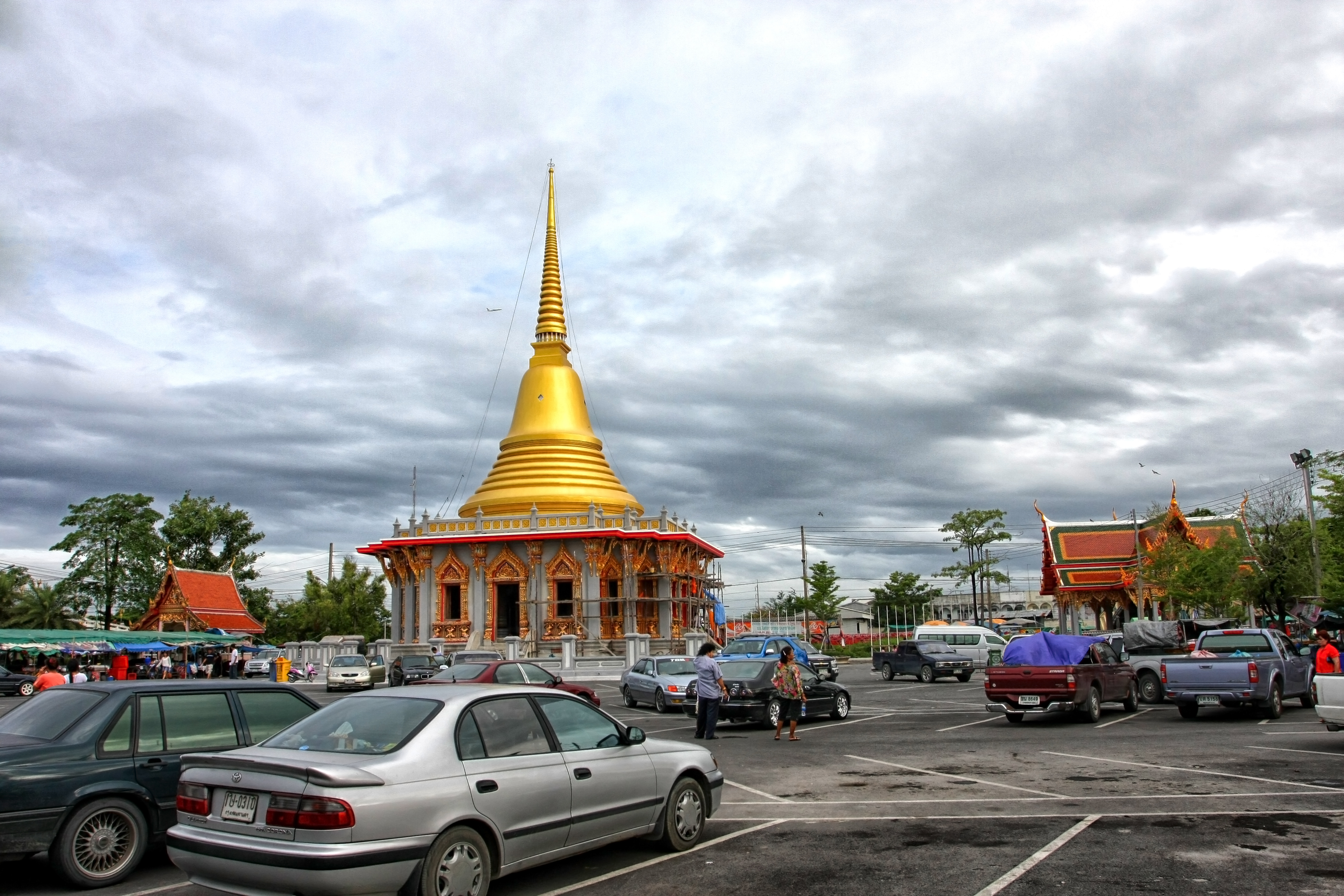

- Location within Thailand

Religion
- Affiliation: Buddhism
- Sect: Theravāda, Mahānikāya

Location
- Location: Mu 11, Bang Phli Yai Subdistrict, Bang Phli District, Samut Prakan Province
- Country: Thailand

Architecture
- Founder: Unknown

Wat Bang Phli Yai Nai (Thai: วัดบางพลีใหญ่ใน, pronounced [wát bāːŋ pʰlīː jàj nāj]) is a Thai Buddhist temple in the area of Bang Phli Yai Subdistrict, Bang Phli District, Samut Prakan Province, outskirts Bangkok.

The temple is classified as the third rank of royal temple, and has a long history since the middle Ayutthaya period. It was formerly known as Wat Phlapphla Chai Chana Songkhram (วัดพลับพลาชัยชนะสงคราม; literally "victory pavilion temple") as it was built to commemorate King Naresuan's victory over Burma army in this area.

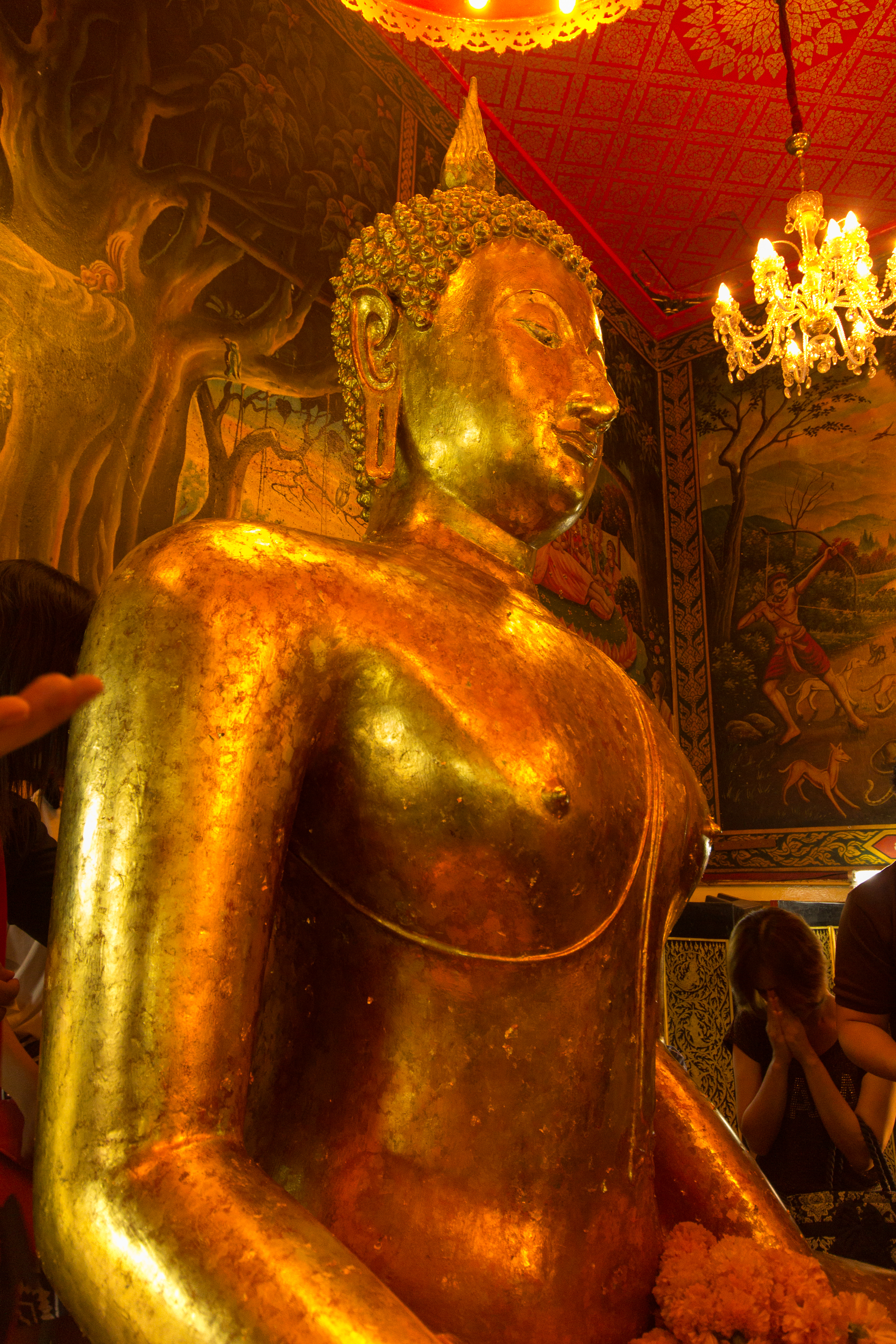
Luang Pho To

This temple is well known from the principal Buddha statue that is called Luang Pho To (หลวงพ่อโต), one of the most revered Buddha statues in Thailand. According to folklore, it was first sighted floating in the Khlong Samrong canal by one of three brothers who were escaping the war with the Burmese during the Ayutthaya period.

While some folklore says it floated along the tides, along with four other Buddha statues or two statues, all of which are sacred Buddha statues in the central basin (Luang Pho Sothon (หลวงพ่อโสธร) of Wat Sothonwararam in Chachoengsao, Luang Pho Wat Rai Khing (หลวงพ่อวัดไร่ขิง) of Wat Rai Khing in Nakhon Pathom, Luang Pho Ban Laem (หลวงพ่อบ้านแหลม) of Wat Ban Laem in Samut Songkram, and Luang Pho Thong (หลวงพ่อทอง) or Luang Pho Wat Khao Takrao (หลวงพ่อวัดเขาตะเครา) of Wat Khao Takrao in Phetchaburi).

In addition, Old Bang Phli Market (ตลาดโบราณบางพลี), a traditional marketplace and community situated along the Khlong Samrong next to the temple. With a history spanning more than 100 years, the market retains elements of its traditional character, with a variety of small shops reflecting the area's local way of life..

Both temple and market are situated behind Big C Bang Phli, Thepharak Rd km 13.
