= Bang Kaeo (town) =

Bang Kaeo บางแก้ว
- Town Municipality
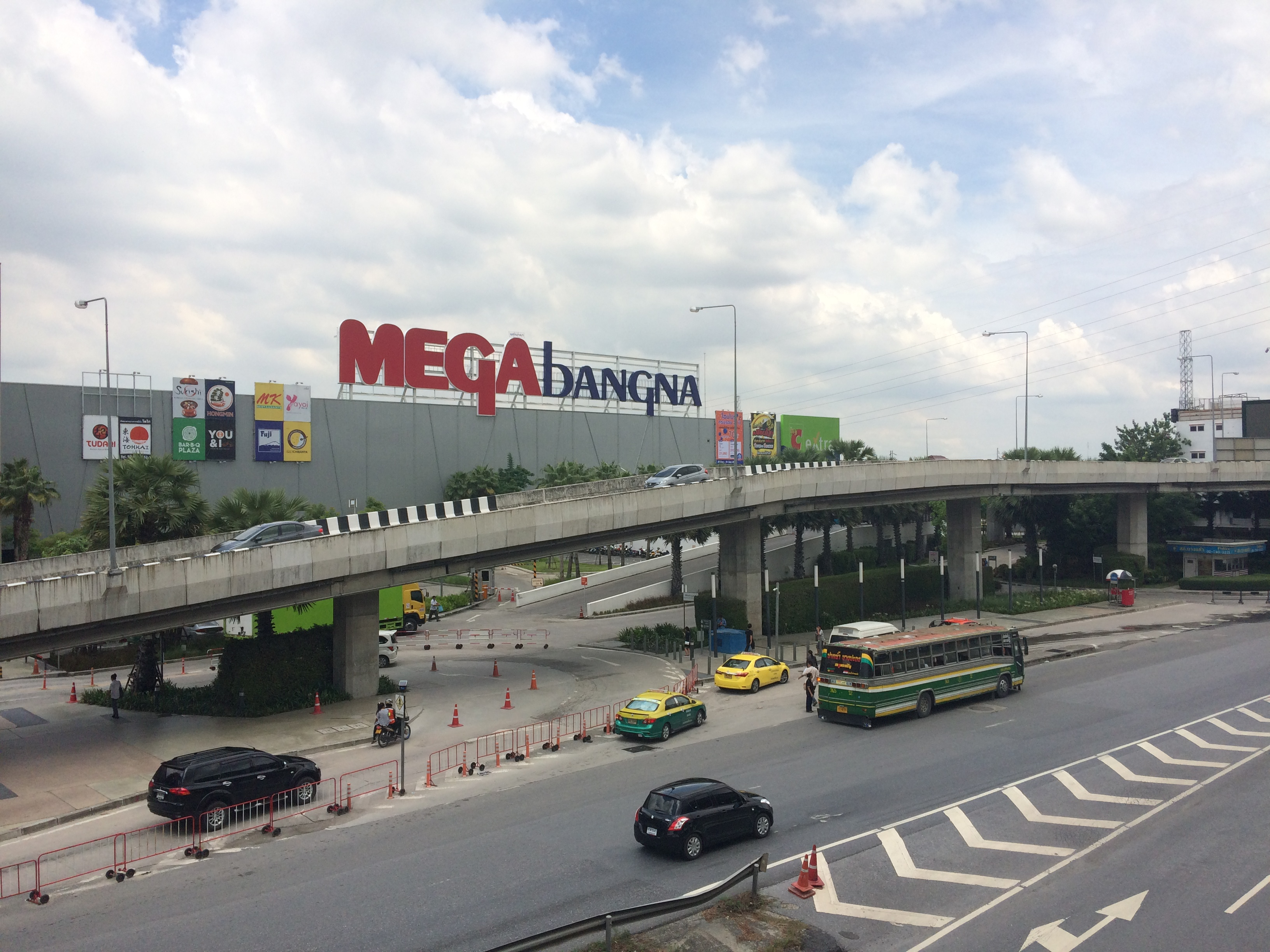

- Location in Bangkok Metropolitan Region
- Coordinates: 13°38′13.8″N 100°39′46.8″E
- Country: Thailand
- Province: Samut Prakan
- District: Bang Phli
- Founded: 3 March 1995
- Town Municipality: 30 August 2019

Population (2019)
  - Total: 59,478
- Time zone: UTC+7 (ICT)
- Area code: (+66) 34

Bang Kaeo (Thai: บางแก้ว) is a town (Thesaban Mueang) which covers the entire Bang Kaeo Subdistrict, located in the Bang Phli District (Amphoe) of Samut Prakan Province in the Bangkok Metropolitan Region of Central Thailand. In 2019, it had a total population of 59,478 people.
