= Bang Pla subdistrict, Samut Prakan =

Bang Pla บางปลา
- Tambon
- Interactive map of Bang Pla
- Coordinates: 13°34′52″N 100°44′33″E
- Country: Thailand
- Province: Samut Prakan
- Amphoe: Bang Phli

Population (2018)
  - Total: 32,819
- Time zone: UTC+7 (ICT)
- Postal code: 10540
- TIS 1099: 110303

Bang Pla (Thai: บางปลา, pronounced [bāːŋ plāː]) is a tambon (subdistrict) of Bang Phli District, in Samut Prakan Province, Thailand. In 2018, it had a total population of 32,819 people.
