= Nong Prue, Samut Prakan =

Nong Prue หนองปรือ
- Tambon
- Interactive map of Nong Prue
- Coordinates: 13°40′3.4″N 100°47′8.5″E
- Country: Thailand
- Province: Samut Prakan
- Amphoe: Bang Phli

Population (2017)
  - Total: 2,719
- Time zone: UTC+7 (ICT)
- Postal code: 10540
- TIS 1099: 110309

Nong Prue (Thai: หนองปรือ, pronounced [nɔ̌ːŋ prɯ̄ː]) is a tambon (subdistrict) of Bang Phli District, in Samut Prakan Province, Thailand. In 2017 it had a total population of 2,719 people.

== Administration ==
=== Central administration ===
The tambon is subdivided into 3 administrative villages (muban).

No.	Name	Thai
1.	Ban Khlong Nong Ngu Hao	บ้านคลองหนองงูเห่า
2.	Ban Khlong Thong Khung	บ้านคลองท้องคุ้ง
3.	Ban Ruam Chai Phatthana	บ้านร่วมใจพัฒนา

=== Local administration ===
The whole area of the subdistrict is covered by the subdistrict administrative organization (SAO) Nong Prue (องค์การบริหารส่วนตำบลหนองปรือ).
