= Bang Kaeo =

Bang Kaeo may refer to:

- Thai Bangkaew Dog, a dog breed
- Bang Kaeo (town), town in Samut Prakan Province
- Bang Kaeo District, Phatthalung Province
