= Chakri Naruebodindra Medical Institute =

Chakri Naruebodindra Medical Institute สถาบันการแพทย์จักรีนฤบดินทร์

Geography
- Location: 111 Suvarnabhumi Canal Road, Bang Pla Subdistrict, Bang Phli, Samut Prakan, Thailand
- Coordinates: 13.526464°N 100.760851°E

Organisation
- Type: Teaching, University
- Affiliated university: Faculty of Medicine Ramathibodi Hospital, Mahidol University

Services
- Standards: Primary and Secondary Care
- Beds: 400

History
- Opened: 25 December 2017

Links
- Website: https://med.mahidol.ac.th/cnmi/index.php

The Chakri Naruebodindra Medical Institute (CNMI) (Thai: สถาบันการแพทย์จักรีนฤบดินทร์) is a medical institute of the Faculty of Medicine Ramathibodi Hospital, Mahidol University in Thailand. In addition to providing medical services to the general public, it is also one of the two main facilities for training students of the faculty.

== History ==
The Chakri Naruebodindra Medical Institute was initiated from King Bhumibol's royal address regarding the construction of a medical facility for both treatment and education in the Samut Prakan Area. This is to increase the number of healthcare services provided for local residents, as most citizens in the area work in the secondary sector in factories and industrial plants. It would also provide medical services for provinces in the eastern region of Thailand including: Chonburi Province, Rayong Province, Chanthaburi Province, Trat Province, Chachoengsao Province, Prachinburi Province and Sa Kaeo Province. Furthermore, the majority of hospitals located in Samut Prakan are of the private sector, unaffordable to those with lower income.

With regards to the faculty, the increased numbers of patients and the extremely limited space of Ramathibodi Hospital in central Bangkok meant expansion was very difficult. Furthermore, Ramathibodi Hospital primarily handles tertiary care patients, meaning there was very little opportunity for medical students to have primary and secondary care exposure.

It was built in commemoration of King Bhumibol Adulyadej's 7th cycle (84th) birthday anniversary on 5 December 2011 to increase the outreach of medical services in Samut Prakan Province and neighbouring provinces as well as increasing opportunities for the medical treatment in the locality.

The Chakri Naruebodindra Medical Institute opened on 25 December 2017 by Princess Maha Chakri Sirindhorn. In 2020, it was used as an isolation facility for patients infected by COVID-19 admitted by the Faculty of Medicine during the COVID-19 pandemic. Patients were transferred here for medical care from the main Ramathibodi Hospital site in central Bangkok.

Medical education at the site was initiated in the 2021 academic year.

== Infrastructure ==
- Ramathibodi Chakri Naruebodindra Hospital (Thai: โรงพยาบาลรามาธิบดีจักรีนฤบดินทร์): hospital with a capacity of 400 beds
- Community Building and Ramathibodi Museum
- Queen Sirikit Learning and Research Centre
- Student Dormitories
- Recreation Building
- Staff Dormitories
- Prince Mahidol Adulyadej and Princess Srinagarindra Monument
- Parking Building

== See also ==
- Faculty of Medicine Ramathibodi Hospital, Mahidol University
- Ramathibodi Hospital
- Mahidol University
- Hospitals in Thailand
