= Bang Phli Yai =

Bang Phli Yai บางพลีใหญ่
- Tambon
- Interactive map of Bang Phli Yai
- Coordinates: 13°36′33.1″N 100°42′11.5″E
- Country: Thailand
- Province: Samut Prakan
- Amphoe: Bang Phli

Population (2017)
  - Total: 91,678
- Time zone: UTC+7 (TST)
- Postal code: 10540
- TIS 1099: 110301

Bang Phli Yai (Thai: บางพลีใหญ่, pronounced [bāːŋ pʰlīː jàj]) is a tambon (subdistrict) of Bang Phli District, in Samut Prakan Province, Thailand. In 2017, it had a total population of 91,678 people.

== Administration ==
=== Central administration ===
The tambon is subdivided into 23 administrative villages (muban).

No.	Name	Thai
1.	Ban Khlong Bang Kaeo Yai	บ้านคลองบางแก้วใหญ่
2.	Ban Khlong Bang Kaeo Noi	บ้านคลองบางแก้วน้อย
3.	Ban Khlong Bang Kaeo	บ้านคลองบางแก้ว
4.	Ban Khlong Mai	บ้านคลองใหม่
5.	Ban Bang Phli	บ้านบางพลี
6.	Ban Bang Phli	บ้านบางพลี
7.	Ban Khlong Bang Suea Tai	บ้านคลองบางเสือตาย
8.	Ban Bang Phli	บ้านบางพลี
9.	Ban Bang Phli	บ้านบางพลี
10.	Ban Bang Phli	บ้านบางพลี
11.	Ban Bang Phli	บ้านบางพลี
12.	Ban Khlong Bang Phli	บ้านคลองบางพลี
13.	Ban Khlong Suan	บ้านคลองสวน
14.	Ban Khlong Salut	บ้านคลองสลุด
15.	Ban Khlong Chuat Lak Khao	บ้านคลองชวดลากข้าว
16.	Ban Khlong Chuat Lak Khao	บ้านคลองชวดลากข้าว
17.	Ban Khlong Chuat Lak Khao	บ้านคลองชวดลากข้าว
18.	Ban Khlong Bua Khli	บ้านคลองบัวคลี่
19.	Ban Khlong Bua Khli	บ้านคลองบัวคลี่
20.	Ban Khlong Bua Khli	บ้านคลองบัวคลี่
21.	Ban Khlong Thung Chang	บ้านคลองทุ่งช้าง
22.	Ban Khlong Bang Krabue	บ้านคลองบางกระบือ
23.	Ban Khlong Bang Krabue	บ้านคลองบางกระบือ

=== Local administration ===
The area of the subdistrict is shared by 2 local governments.

- the subdistrict municipality (Thesaban Tambon) Bang Phli (เทศบาลตำบลบางพลี)
- the subdistrict administrative organization (SAO) Bang Phli Yai (องค์การบริหารส่วนตำบลบางพลีใหญ่)
