= Bang Kaeo subdistrict, Samut Prakan =

Bang Kaeo บางแก้ว
- Tambon
- Interactive map of Bang Kaeo
- Coordinates: 13°38′13″N 100°39′49″E
- Country: Thailand
- Province: Samut Prakan
- Amphoe: Bang Phli

Population (2018)
  - Total: 56,949
- Time zone: UTC+7 (ICT)
- Postal code: 10540
- TIS 1099: 110302

Bang Kaeo (Thai: บางแก้ว, pronounced [bāːŋ kɛ̂ːw]) is a tambon (subdistrict) of Bang Phli District, in Samut Prakan Province, Thailand. In 2018, it had a total population of 56,949 people.
