= Bang Chalong =

Bang Chalong บางโฉลง
- Tambon
- Interactive map of Bang Chalong
- Coordinates: 13°36′49″N 100°45′4″E
- Country: Thailand
- Province: Samut Prakan
- Amphoe: Bang Phli

Population (2017)
  - Total: 41,834
- Time zone: UTC+7 (TST)
- Postal code: 10540
- TIS 1099: 110304

Bang Chalong (Thai: บางโฉลง, pronounced [bāːŋ t͡ɕʰā.lǒːŋ]) is a tambon (subdistrict) of Bang Phli District, in Samut Prakan Province, Thailand. In 2017, it had a total population of 41,834 people.

== Toponymy ==
The name "Bang Chalong" is believed to derive from the Khmer word "Chanlong" (จรรโลง), which literally means "lifting." This refers to the act of lifting yo (ยอ), a traditional Thai fishing gear, or boats from the waters of the local canal, Khlong Bang Chalong. The word "Bang" denotes a riverside or waterfront community. Thus, Bang Chalong can be translated as "the place of lifting."

== Administration ==
=== Central administration ===
The tambon is subdivided into 11 administrative villages (muban).

No.	Name	Thai
1.	Ban Khlong Bang Chalong	บ้านคลองบางโฉลง
2.	Ban Ko Bang Chalong	บ้านเกาะบางโฉลง
3.	Ban Khlong Bang Kwang Bon	บ้านคลองบางขวางบน
4.	Ban Khlong Bang Kwang	บ้านคลองบางขวาง
5.	Ban Bang Chalong Bon	บ้านบางโฉลงบน
6.	Ban Khlong Bang Chalong Lang	บ้านคลองบางโฉลงล่าง
7.	Ban Khlong Bang Nam Chuet Bon	บ้านคลองบางน้ำจืดบน
8.	Ban Khlong Bang Nam Chuet	บ้านคลองบางน้ำจืด
9.	Ban Khlong Bang Takhian	บ้านคลองบางตะเคียน
10.	Ban Khlong Bang Nam Chuet	บ้านคลองบางน้ำจืด
11.	Ban Khlong Ong Taek	บ้านคลองโอ่งแตก

=== Local administration ===
The area of the subdistrict is shared by 2 local governments.

- the subdistrict municipality (Thesaban Tambon) Bang Phli (เทศบาลตำบลบางพลี)
- the subdistrict administrative organization (SAO) Bang Chalong (องค์การบริหารส่วนตำบลบางโฉลง)
