= Bang Phli district =

Bang Phli บางพลี
- District
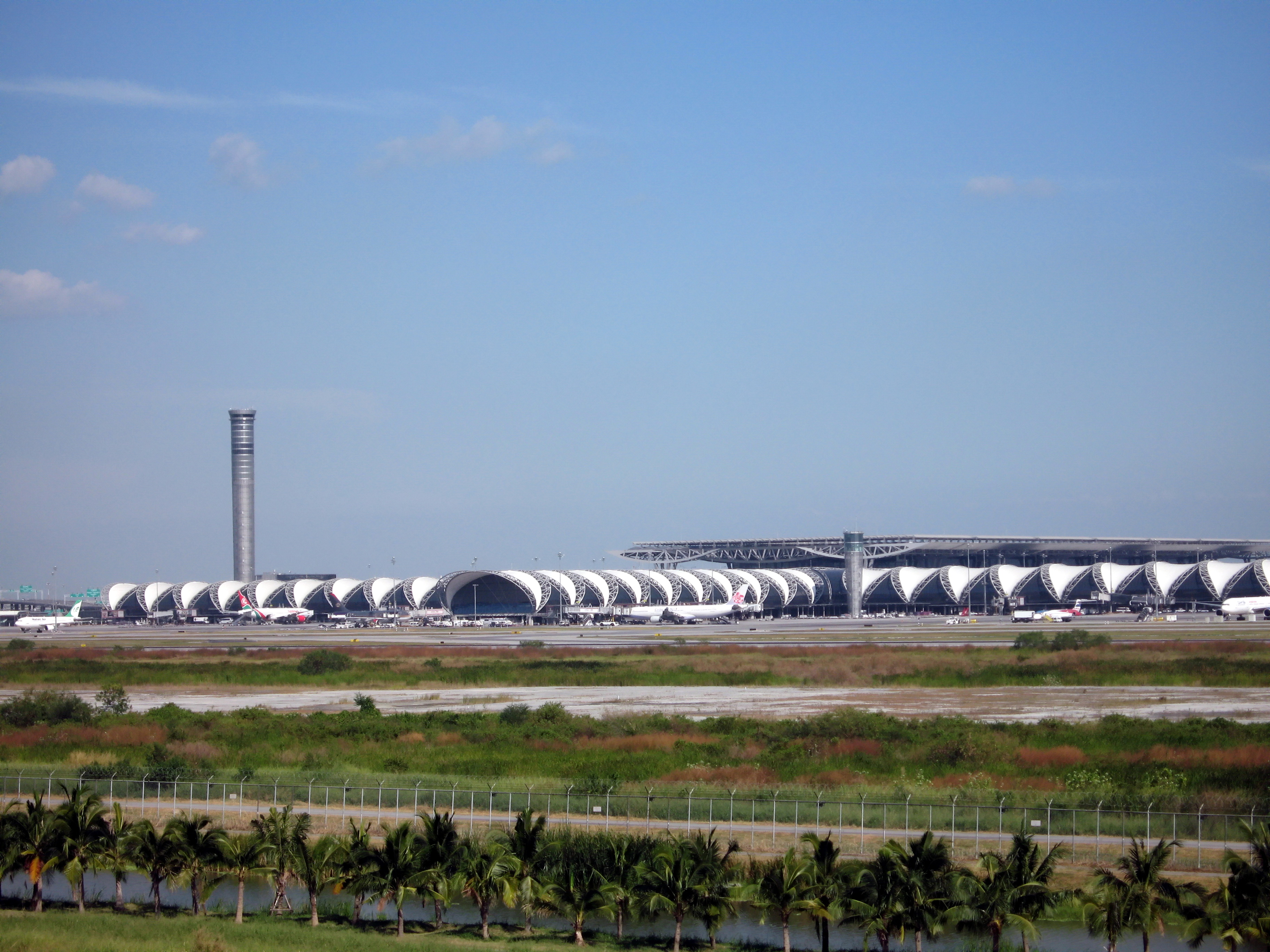
- Suvarnabhumi Airport

- District location in Samut Prakan province
- Coordinates: 13°36′21″N 100°42′22″E
- Country: Thailand
- Province: Samut Prakan
- Seat: Bang Phli Yai
- Subdistricts: 6
- Muban: 83

Area
  - Total: 260.0 km^{2} (100.4 sq mi)

Population (2017)
  - Total: 253,218
  - Density: 973.91/km^{2} (2,522.4/sq mi)
- Time zone: UTC+7 (ICT)
- Postal code: 10540
- Geocode: 1103

Bang Phli (Thai: บางพลี, pronounced [bāːŋ pʰlīː]) is a district (amphoe) of Samut Prakan province in Thailand. It is home to Suvarnabhumi Airport (also called (New) Bangkok International Airport), which opened on 28 September 2006 as Thailand's primary airport. The district was part of the once-proposed Nakhon Suvarnabhumi Province.

== History ==
Bang Phli appeared as evidence that it has been a habitat since the Khmer era (around 435–1158), because many areas around it are names that are derived from Khmer such as Thap Nang, Nam Daeng, Bang Chalong etc. The Khlong Samrong canal, which is 55 km (34 mi) long, flows through the area and is considered a main watercourse.

Rattanakosin's renowned poet Sunthorn Phu wrote about Khlong Samrong in his work "Nirat Mueang Klaeng" during a visit to his father in Rayong Province. When he arrived here and impressed with the young people that take a boat pass through.

The name "Bang Phli" came from the assumption that when King Naresuan the Great fought with the enemies that came to invade Ayutthaya. He stopped the army here and have performed a ritual called "Bat Phli" to terrorize the enemies and to be an auspicious for the army.

In the reign of King Rama III, Bang Phli became a community where more people came to live, consisting of a variety of people, such as Laotians, Mons with Teochews and Hainanese. Most Chinese have a career in trading and building houses along the waterfront. Therefore, causing Bang Phli to prosper respectively and raised the status to a district in 1895.

== Geography ==
Bang Phli district is on the eastern outskirts of Bangkok bisected by the Bang Na-Chonburi Expressway.

Neighbouring districts are Bang Na, Prawet, and Lat Krabang (all in Bangkok) in the north, Bang Sao Thong and Bang Bo to the east, and Mueang Samut Prakan to the south and west.

== Administration ==
The district is divided into six sub-districts (tambons), which are further subdivided into 83 villages (mubans). Bang Phli itself is also a sub-district municipality (thesaban tambon) which includes parts of tambons Bang Phli Yai, Bang Pla, and Bang Chao Long. There are another six tambon administrative organizations (TAO) in the district.

No.	Name	Thai	Villages	Pop.
1.	Bang Phli Yai	บางพลีใหญ่	23	91,678
2.	Bang Kaeo	บางแก้ว	16	54,634
3.	Bang Pla	บางปลา	15	32,751
4.	Bang Chalong	บางโฉลง	11	41,834
8.	Racha Thewa	ราชาเทวะ	15	29,602
9.	Nong Prue	หนองปรือ	3	2,719

The missing geocodes in the table are now form Bang Sao Thong district.

== Economy ==
Bang Phli is home to a number of manufacturing companies including Plan Toys; lingerie company, Triumph International; auto parts maker, Yarnphan; Surf Technicians Inc.; windsurfing equipment design company, Natural Corporation; chemical manufacturer, Hanwha Chemical alkali soluble resin (ASR) and emulsion plant; furniture manufacturer, Rockworth;, Hino Motors, and a Nivea cosmetics production plant. The first IKEA store in Thailand opened at Mega Bangna on the Bang Na-Bang Pakong Highway in Bang Kaeo in late-2011.

== Festivals ==
Bang Phli is known for its annual Lotus Flower (Rap Bua) Festival, which takes place on the last day of vassa on the fourteenth day of the waxing moon in the eleventh lunar month, usually the full moon in October. A boat carrying a replica of the Luang Poh To Buddha statue from the temple Wat Bang Pli Yai Nai is moved along the Khlong Samrong canal. The people on the banks of the canal throw lotus flowers onto the boat, as donating lotus flowers to Buddha is merit-making.

== Attractions ==
- Bang Phli floating market or Ancient Bang Phli market: an authentic market over 100 years old which still remains the same. It is located on the bank of Khlong Samrong. It was one of the flourishing communities in the past. It is assumed that Chinese opened this market in 1857 to transport goods and people from the east coast to Bangkok. What is interesting about the market are traditional wooden shophouses lined along the Khlong Samrong with a length of 500 m (1640 ft). They were built with Thai mixed Chinese architectures two-storey hipped roof.
- Wat Bang Phli Yai Nai: an ancient Buddhist temple rim Khlong Samrong next to floating market, where Luang Poh To is enshrined. This Buddha statue has a folklore that is said to float over the water more than 200 years ago along with two other Buddha statues (Luang Poh Ban Laem of Wat Ban Laem and Luang Poh Sothon of Wat Sothonwararam).
- Wat Bang Phil Yai Klang, also known as Wat Phra Non: another Buddhist temple in pair with Wat Bang Phli Yai Nai, located between Wat Bang Phli Yai Nai and Wat Khong Kharam (Wat Yai Nu), hence the name Wat Bang Phli Yai Klang (Klang in Thai means middle). Highlight of the temple remains at the biggest Buddha reclining posture statue in Thailand named Phra Sakayamunee Si Sumetbophit, with approximately 53 m (173 ft) long.
- Mega Bangna, the first low rise Super Regional shopping center in Southeast Asia.

== Health ==
- Bang Phli Hospital, a general hospital operated by the Ministry of Public Health
- Chakri Naruebodindra Medical Institute (CNMI), a university hospital operated by the Faculty of Medicine Ramathibodi Hospital, Mahidol University

== Education ==
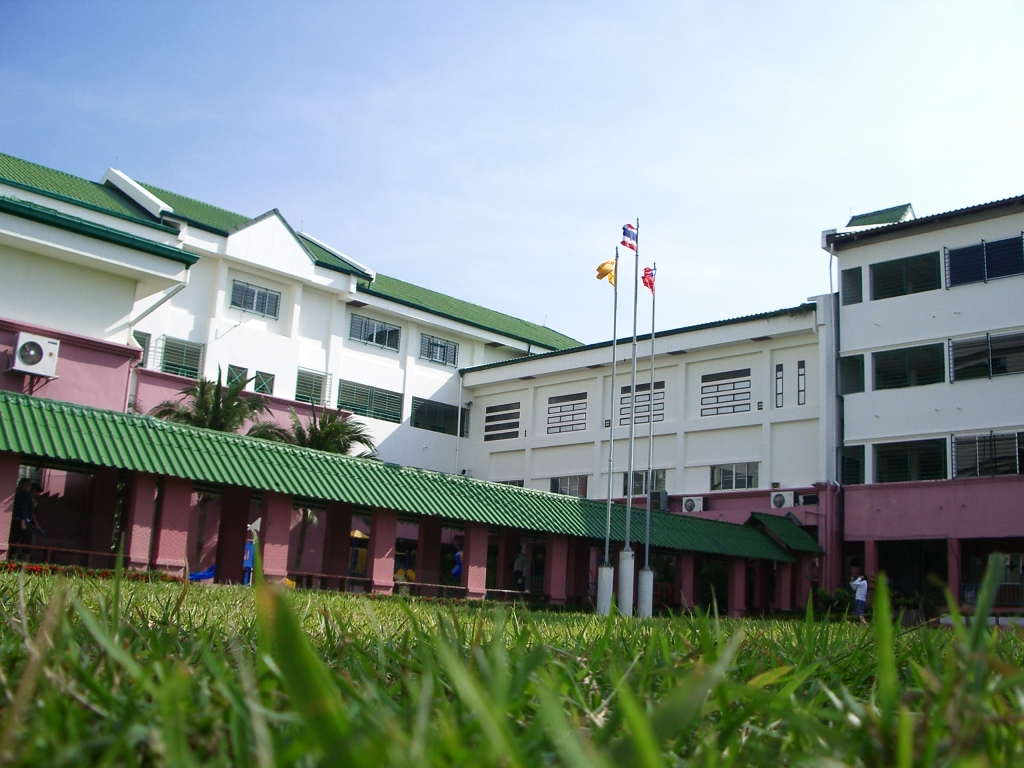
Thai-Chinese International School

- American School of Bangkok Bangna Campus
- Thai-Chinese International School is in Bang Phli Yai
