= Bang Sao Thong district =

Bang Sao Thong บางเสาธง
- District
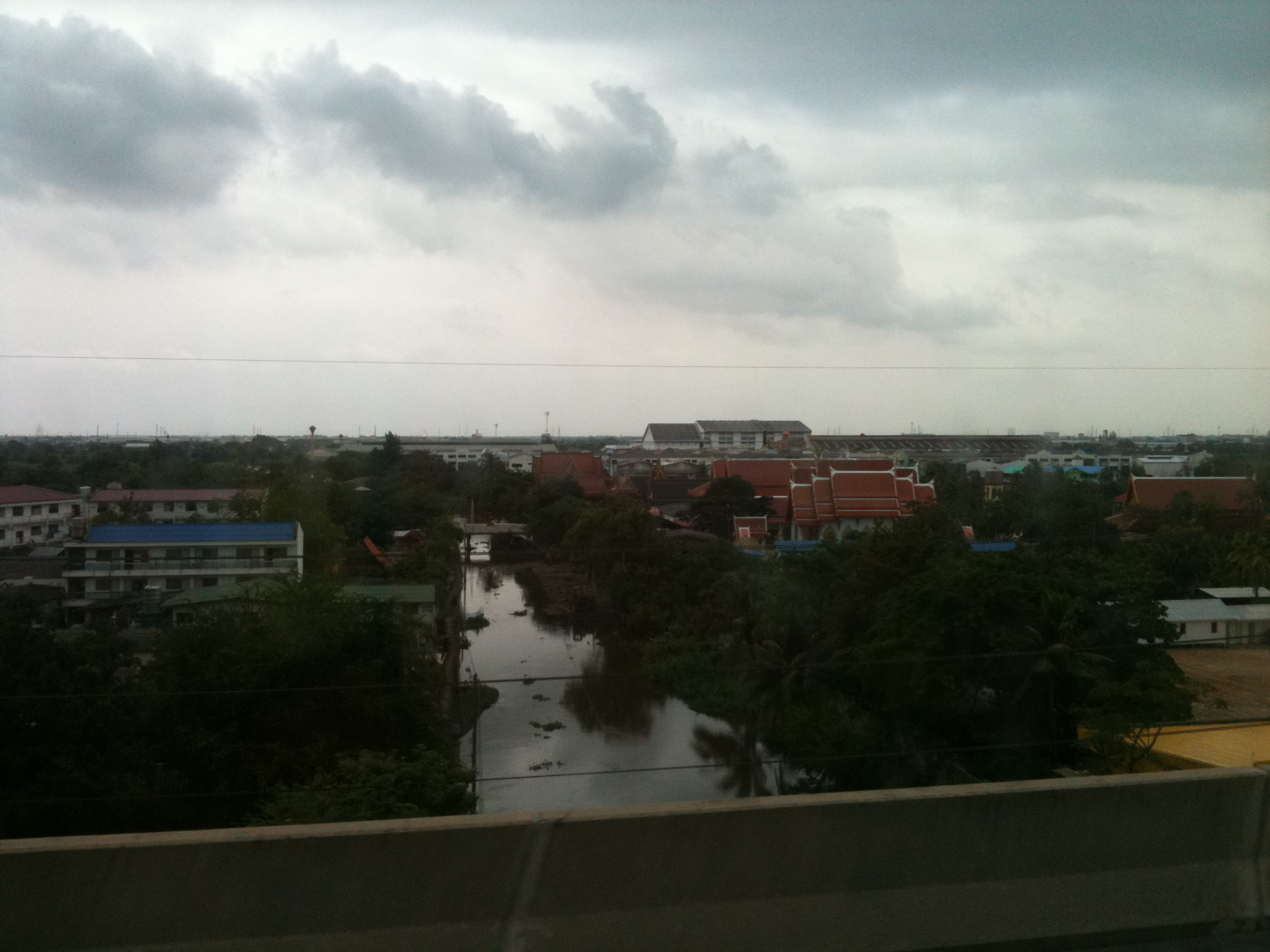
- Klong Bang Krathiam. View from Bang Na - Chonburi Expy Tool Road.

- District location in Samut Prakan province
- Coordinates: 13°35′42″N 100°49′50″E
- Country: Thailand
- Province: Samut Prakan
- Seat: Bang Sao Thong
- Subdistricts: 3

Area
  - Total: 114.79 km^{2} (44.32 sq mi)

Population (2017)
  - Total: 77,519
  - Density: 675.31/km^{2} (1,749.0/sq mi)
- Time zone: UTC+7 (ICT)
- Postal code: 10570
- Geocode: 1106

Bang Sao Thong (Thai: บางเสาธง; pronounced [bāːŋ sǎw tʰōŋ]) is a district (amphoe) of Samut Prakan province in central Thailand.

== Geography ==
Neighboring districts are Lat Krabang to the north, Bang Bo to the east and Bang Phli to the west.

== History ==
Bang Phli New Town (Thai Mueang Mai Bang Phli) was established between 1992 and 1993 as a residential area for high-income families. The area around the new town, comprising three tambons, was then split off from Bang Phli district and formed the new minor district (king amphoe), becoming effective on 1 April 1995.

The Thai government, on 15 May 2007, upgraded all 81 minor districts to full districts. On 24 August 2007 the upgrade became official.

== Economy ==
Nissan has an automobile factory in the district. Nissan produces hybrid electric vehicles (HEVs) there based on its e-Power technology as well as batteries for electric vehicles. It has a production capacity of 370,000 vehicles a year.

== Administration ==
The district is divided into three sub-districts (tambon), which are further subdivided into 39 villages (muban). Bang Sao Thong is a township (thesaban tambon) which covers parts of tambon Bang Sao Thong and Sisa Chorakhe Yai. Each of the tambons has a tambon administrative organization (TAO) responsible for non-municipal areas.

No.	Name	Thai name	Villages	Pop.
1.	Bang Sao Thong	บางเสาธง	17	52,488
2.	Sisa Chorakhe Noi	ศีรษะจรเข้น้อย	10	12,986
3.	Sisa Chorakhe Yai	ศีรษะจรเข้ใหญ่	12	12,045
