= ITO Joint Venture =

ITO Joint Venture, or abbreviated "ITO JV" or "ITO", is a joint venture formed by Italian-Thai Development PCL, Takenaka Corporation, and Obayashi Corporation, all leading companies in Thailand and the Japanese building industry. ITO JV as a team was responsible for construction of Suvarnabhumi Airport (BKK), one of the world's largest airports and Thailand's largest airport construction project.

== See also ==
- Suvarnabhumi Airport
