= Bang Bo district =

Bang Bo บางบ่อ
- District
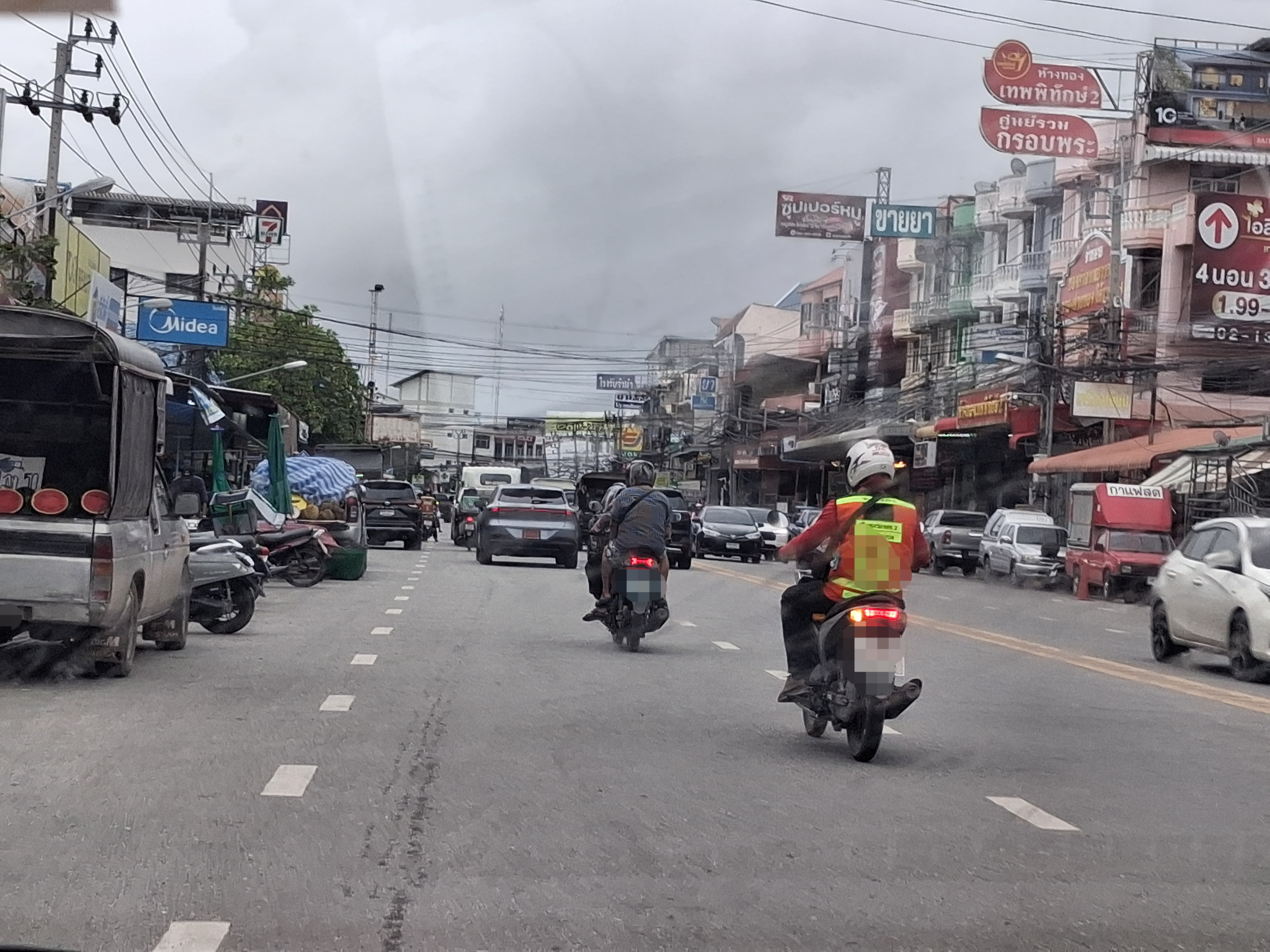
- Downtown Bang Bo

- District location in Samut Prakan province
- Coordinates: 13°34′27″N 100°50′10″E
- Country: Thailand
- Province: Samut Prakan
- Seat: Bang Bo
- Subdistricts: 8

Area
  - Total: 245.007 km^{2} (94.598 sq mi)

Population (2017)
  - Total: 107,910
  - Density: 440.43/km^{2} (1,140.7/sq mi)
- Time zone: UTC+7 (ICT)
- Postal code: 10560
- Geocode: 1102

Bang Bo (Thai: บางบ่อ, pronounced [bāːŋ bɔ̀ː]) is a district (amphoe) of Samut Prakan province in Thailand.

== Geography ==
Neighbouring districts are Mueang Samut Prakan, Bang Phli, and Bang Sao Thong to the west, Lat Krabang (Bangkok and Mueang Chachoengsao to the north, and Ban Pho and Bang Pakong (both in Chachoengsao province) to the east. To the south is the Bay of Bangkok.

== History ==
The district was renamed from Bang Hia (บางเหี้ย, 'hamlet of water monitors'), to Bang Bo ('hamlet of ponds') in 1930.

== Economy ==
Hino Motors Manufacturing (Thailand) Ltd (HMMT) is constructing a manufacturing and development centre at the Asia Industrial Estate Suvarnabhumi in the district. To be operational in 2021, the 400,000-square metre centre will supply trucks and buses to the ASEAN region. Hino is investing 3.65 billion baht in the facility which will employ 1,300 workers in its initial stages of operation.

Bang Bo is known as a snakeskin gourami (Trichopodus pectoralis) aquacultural area. The freshwater fish is processed into salted fish.

== Administration ==
The district is divided into eight sub-districts (tambons), which are further subdivided into 74 villages (mubans). There are three townships (thesaban tambons). Bang Bo and Khlong Dan each cover parts of the same-named tambon, and Khlong Suan covers tambon Khlong Suan. There are a further seven tambon administrative organizations (TAO), for each tambon except Khlong Suan.

No.	Name	Thai name	Villages	Pop.
1.	Bang Bo	บางบ่อ	11	32,741
2.	Ban Ra Kat	บ้านระกาศ	10	6,634
3.	Bang Phli Noi	บางพลีน้อย	11	9,166
4.	Bang Phriang	บางเพรียง	6	19,797
5.	Khlong Dan	คลองด่าน	14	28,861
6.	Khlong Suan	คลองสวน	7	3,234
7.	Preng	เปร็ง	9	4,279
8.	Khlong Niyom Yattra	คลองนิยมยาตรา	6	3,198

== Khlong Prawet Buri Rom ==
Khlong Suan 100-year-old market (ตลาดคลองสวน 100 ปี) is on Khlong Prawet Buri Rom, a canal bordering two provinces: Khlong Suan in Bang Bo, Samut Prakan and Theppharat with Ko Rai of Ban Pho, Chachoengsao. The market dates back to the King Chulalongkorn (Rama V)'s reign. It retains some of the charm of Thailand's old days, similar to SamChuk's 100-year-old market of Sam Chuk district, Suphan Buri province.

== Samut Prakan (Klong Dan) Wastewater Management Project ==
Tambon Klong Dan is the site of a never-completed wastewater treatment plant, approved in 1995, financed in part by the Asian Development Bank (ADB). The 24 billion baht project was not completed due to opposition from local residents and charges of malfeasance levelled against those responsible for the project. In 2014, the Pollution Control Department (PCD) was ordered by the Supreme Administrative Court to pay nine billion baht in compensation to a consortium of contractors building the Klong Dan wastewater treatment plant due to the state's termination of that project in 2003. In July 2016, the Department of Special Investigation (DSI) initiated an investigation of a private consortium, NVPSKG, for corrupt practices related to the 90 percent completed project. In 2015, three senior Pollution Control Department (PCD) employees linked to the consortium were jailed for 20 years for malfeasance. In July 2018 the supreme court sentenced 11 persons, including the former deputy interior minister, to between three and six years in prison. The court found the defendants guilty of fraud in the purchase of 1,900 rai of land at the inflated price of 1.9 billion baht, and irregularities in the construction contract. Public land was fraudulently acquired with title deeds issued to private owners, who then inflated the price before the land was sold to the Thai Pollution Control Department.
