= Samut Prakan province =

Province of Thailand

Samut Prakan province จังหวัดสมุทรปราการ
- Province

Other transcription(s)
  - Chinese: 北榄 bag^{4}na^{2} (Teochew Peng'im)
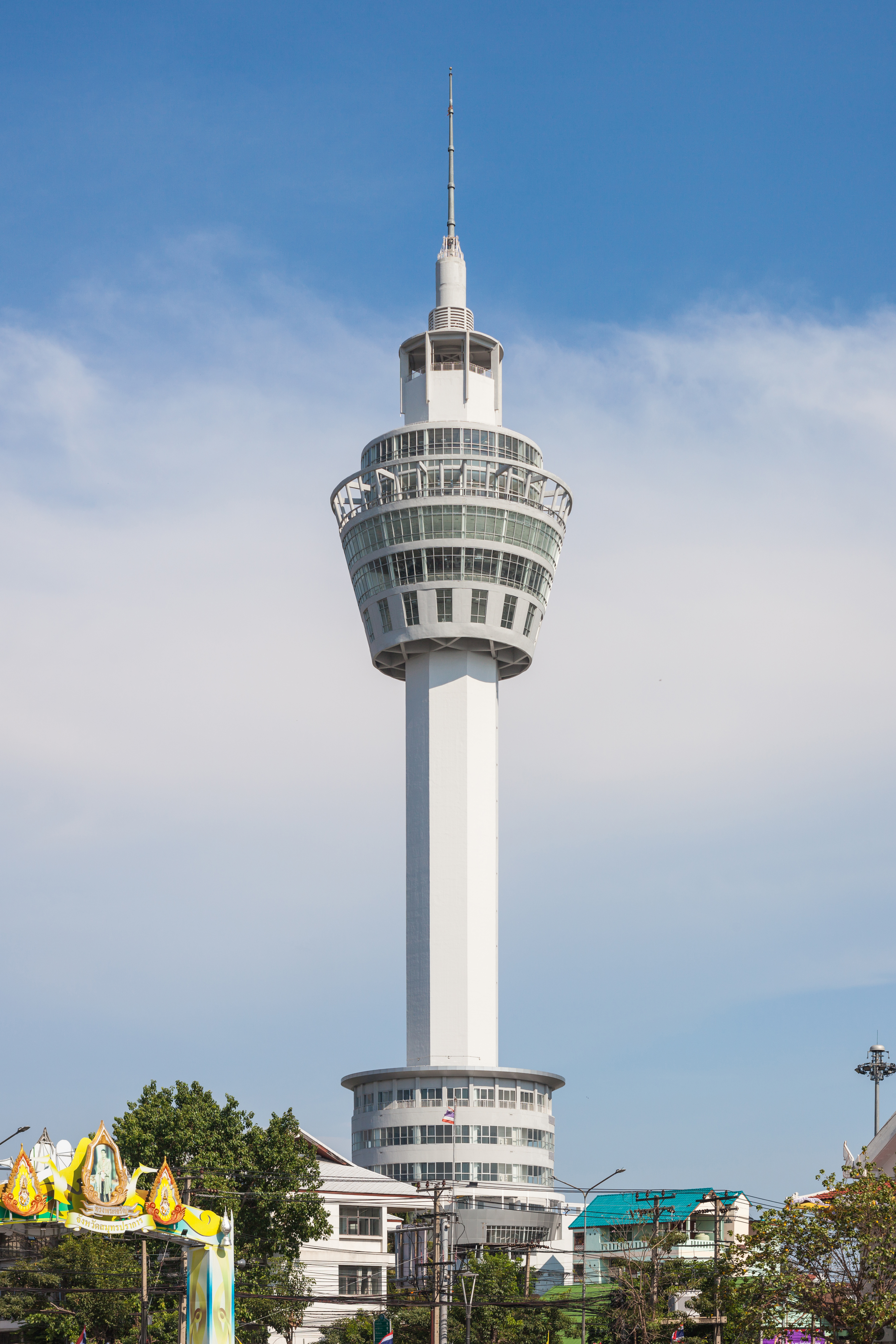
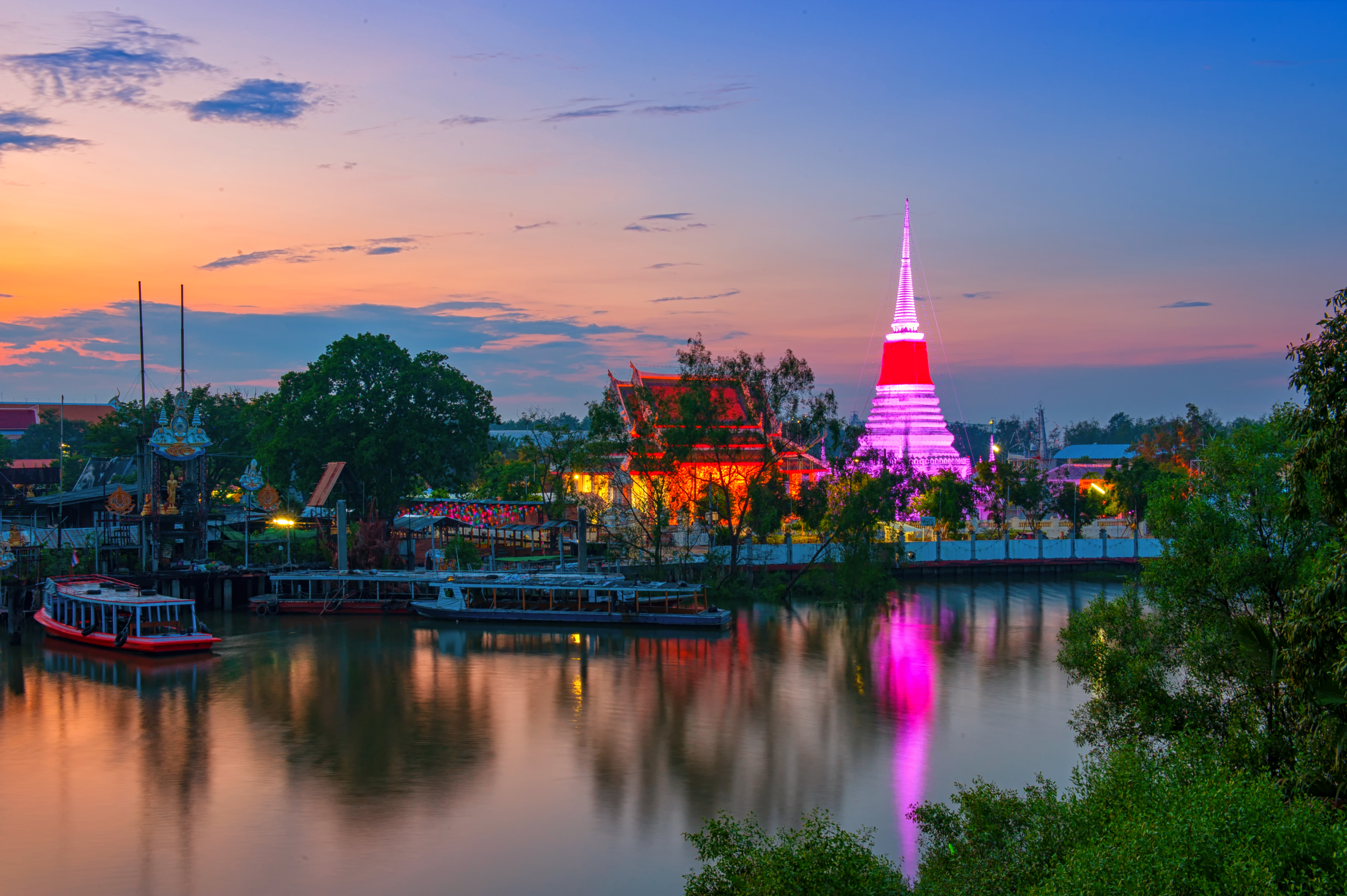
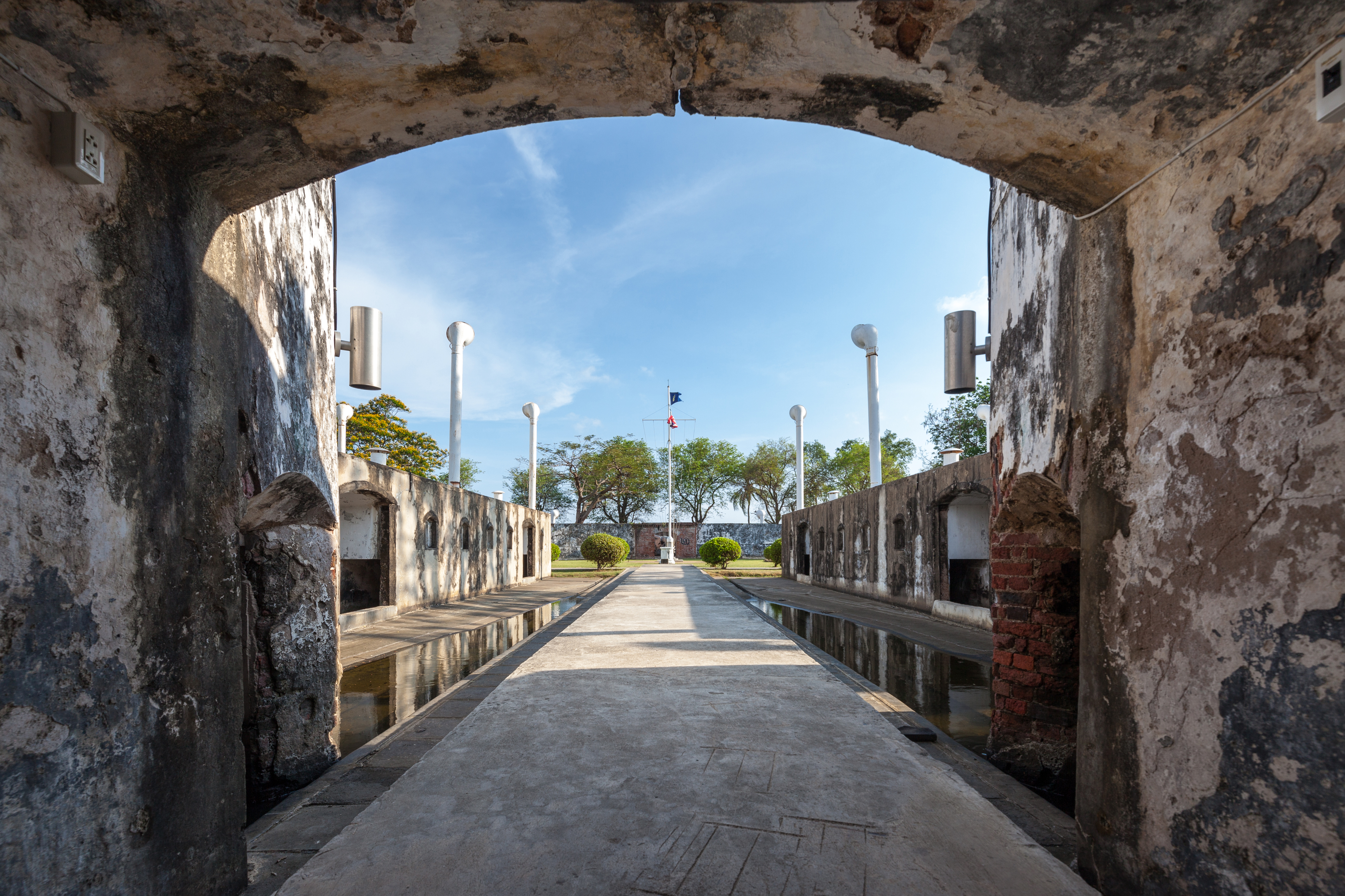
- From top, left to right: Samut Prakan Observation Tower, Wat Phra Samut Chedi, Suvarnabhumi Airport, Phi Sua Samut Fort, Yaksha statue at Suvarnabhumi Airport

- Flag Seal
- Nicknames: Pak Nam City (Thai: เมืองปากน้ำ); Prakan City (Thai: เมืองปราการ)
- Motto: ป้อมยุทธนาวี พระเจดีย์กลางน้ำ ฟาร์มจระเข้ใหญ่ งามวิไลเมืองโบราณ สงกรานต์พระประแดง ปลาสลิดแห้งรสดี ประเพณีรับบัว ครบถ้วนทั่วอุตสาหกรรม ("The naval fort. Phra Chedi surrounded by water. Large crocodile farm. Beautiful Mueang Boran. The Songkran festival of Phra Pradaeng. Tasty dried gourami fish. Lotus receiving festival. Complete in industry.")
- Map of Thailand highlighting Samut Prakan province
- Country: Thailand
- Capital: Samut Prakan

Government
  - Governor: Supphamit Chinnasri

Area
  - Total: 947 km^{2} (366 sq mi)
  - Rank: 72nd

Population (2024)
  - Total: ▲1,380,826
  - Rank: 12th
  - Density: 1,458/km^{2} (3,780/sq mi)
  - Rank: 3rd

Human Achievement Index
  - HAI (2022): 0.6297 "somewhat low" Ranked 53rd

GDP
  - Total: baht 717 billion (US$25.7 billion) (2019)
- Time zone: UTC+07:00 (ICT)
- Postal code: 10xxx
- Calling code: 02
- ISO 3166 code: TH-11
- Website: samutprakan.go.th

Samut Prakan Provincial Administrative Organization องค์การบริหารส่วนจังหวัดสมุทรปราการ
- Provincial Administrative Organization
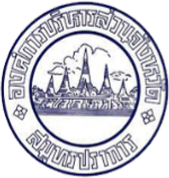
- Seal
- Interactive map of Samut Prakan Provincial Administrative Organization

Government
  - Type: Local administrative divisions
  - Body: Samut Prakan Provincial Administrative Organization
  - President: Sunthorn Pansaengthong
- Website: samutprakan-pao.go.th

Samut Prakan province (Thai: จังหวัดสมุทรปราการ, pronounced [t͡ɕāŋ.wàt̚ sàmùt prāːkāːn], RTGS: changwat samutprakan, sometimes rendered Samutprakan and Samutprakarn) is one of the central provinces of Thailand, established on 9 May 1946 by the Act Establishing Changwat Samut Prakan, Changwat Nonthaburi, Changwat Samut Sakhon and Changwat Nakhon Nayok, Buddhist Era 2489 (1946).

It is a part of the Bangkok Metropolitan Region. Neighbouring provinces are Bangkok, to the north and west, and Chachoengsao to the east. Samut Prakan was previously once home to a Dutch trading post who referred to the area as New Amsterdam. Suvarnabhumi Airport is in Bang Phli district of Samut Prakan province as well as the districts of Bang Kapi, Lat Krabang, and Prawet in neighbouring Bangkok city.

== History ==
Historical affiliations

Below sea level before 18th century
Kingdom of Ayutthaya 18th century – 1767
Kingdom of Thonburi 1767–1782
Kingdom of Siam 1782–1932
Kingdom of Thailand 1932–present

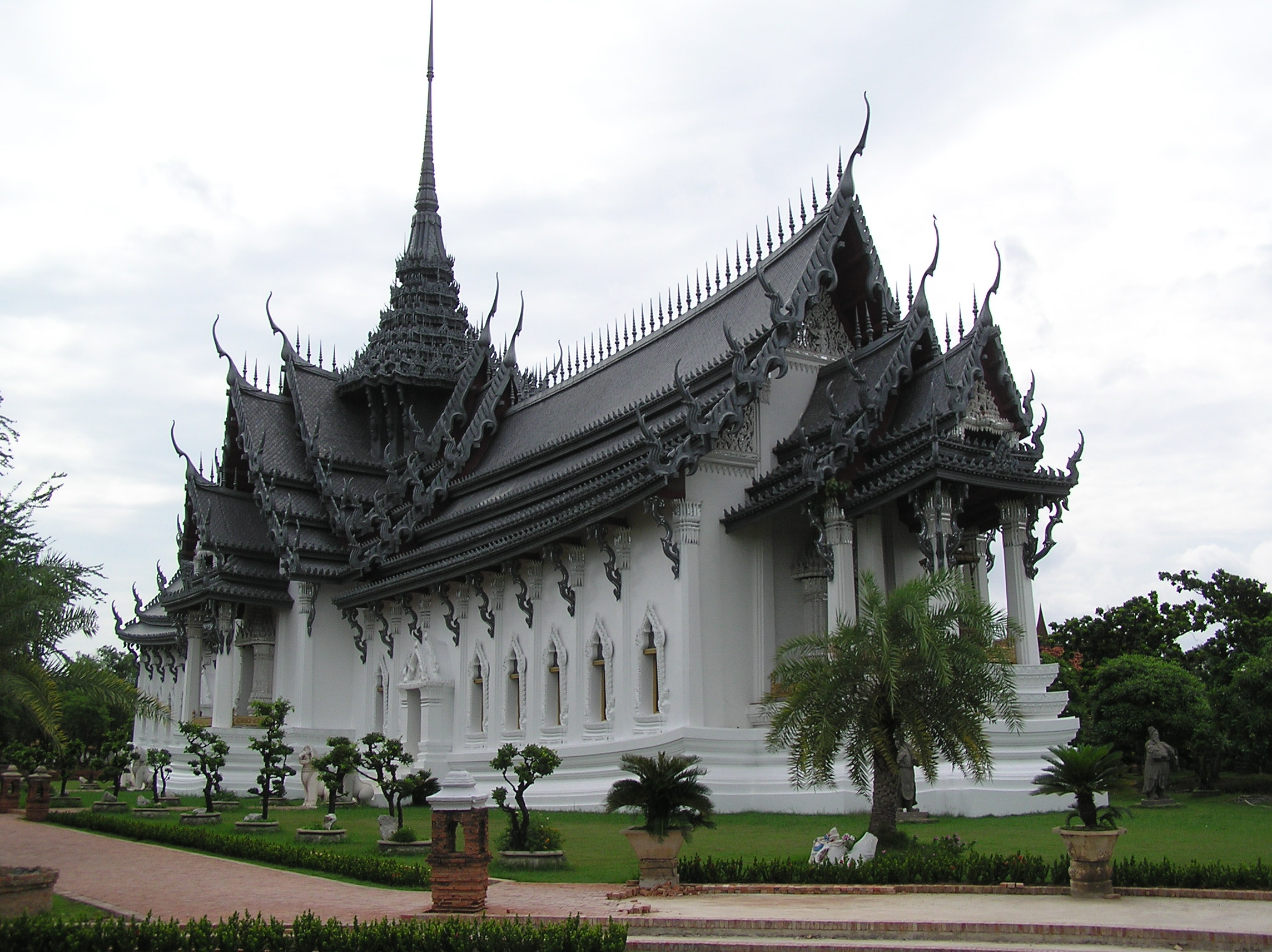
Sanphet Prasat Palace replica, Ancient Siam Museum Park

The province was created during the era of the Ayutthaya Kingdom, with its administrative centre at Prapadaeng. It was the sea port of Siam, and was secured with forts, town moats, and town walls. Walailak Songsiri traces the name to the Khmer royal style kamrateng. The word became an official rank, recorded in the Three Seals Law as phadaeng (ผแดง), pha-daeng (ผะแดง) and pa-daeng (ปะแดง), and passed by way of the name of an excavated image into the name of the port and frontier town. On her account Phra Pradaeng was a frontier town older than Ramathibodi I, standing where Khlong Samrong was cut through to Khlong Thap Nang and the Bang Pakong River, which gave an inland route to the coast and to the eastern towns by land and by water.

King Rama II started building the new centre at Samut Prakan in 1819, after his predecessor King Taksin had abandoned the town fortifications. Altogether six forts were built on both sides of the Chao Phraya River, and on an island in the river the pagoda, Phra Samut Chedi, was erected. These were involved in the Paknam incident of 13 July 1893, which ended the Franco-Siamese conflict with a French naval blockade of Bangkok. Of the original six forts only two still exist today, Phi Sua Samut and Phra Chulachomklao.

== Toponymy ==
In Thai the word samut is from Sanskrit, samudra, meaning 'ocean' or 'sea', and the word prakan is from Sanskrit, prākāra, meaning 'fortress', 'walls', or 'stronghold'.

== Geography ==
Samut Prakan lies at the mouth of the Chao Phraya River on the Gulf of Thailand. Thus the province is also sometimes called Pak Nam (ปากน้ำ), Thai for 'mouth of river'. The part of the province on the west side of the river consists mostly of rice paddies and shrimp farms as well as mangrove forests, while the eastern part is the urban centre, including industrial factories. It is part of the Bangkok metropolis. Samut Prakan is still considered the province with the closest sandy beach to Bangkok. It is a small beach, no more than about 300 metres wide, located in Laem Fa Pha Subdistrict, Phra Samut Chedi District, surrounded by mangrove forests. The urbanization on both sides of the provincial boundary is identical. The total forest area is 28 km^{2} (11 sq mi) or 3 percent of provincial area. The province has a coastline of approximately 47.2 kilometres. Samut Prakan is the site of a skirmish between French and Siamese forces on 13 July 1893, subsequently referred to as the Paknam Incident. This battle resulted in a French victory and the signing of the Franco-Siamese Treaty of 3 October 1893 which ceded territory east of the Mekong River to France, territory that forms much of modern Laos.

== Symbols ==
The provincial seal shows the temple Phra Samut Chedi, the most important site of Buddhist worship in the province.

The provincial tree is Thespesia populnea. The provincial aquatic life is the snakeskin gourami (Trichopodus pectoralis), as it is a vital commercial fish of Samut Prakan. It is widely cultivated and has been famous for a long time, especially in Bang Bo.

== Administrative divisions ==
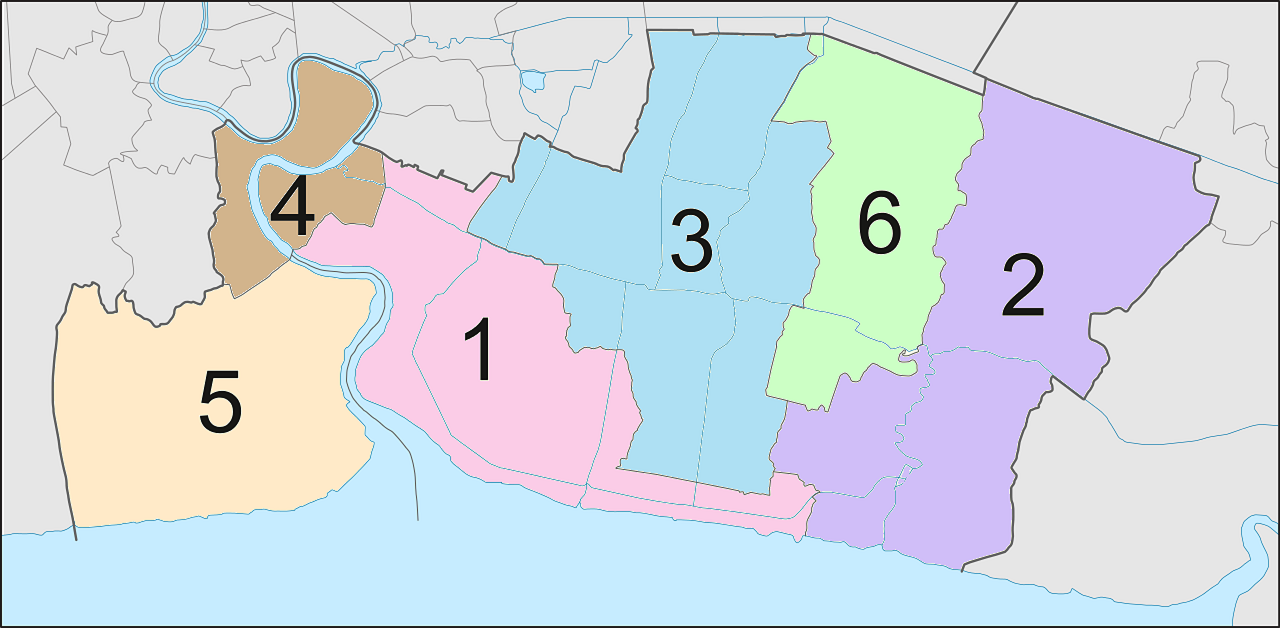
Map of Samut Prakan province with districts

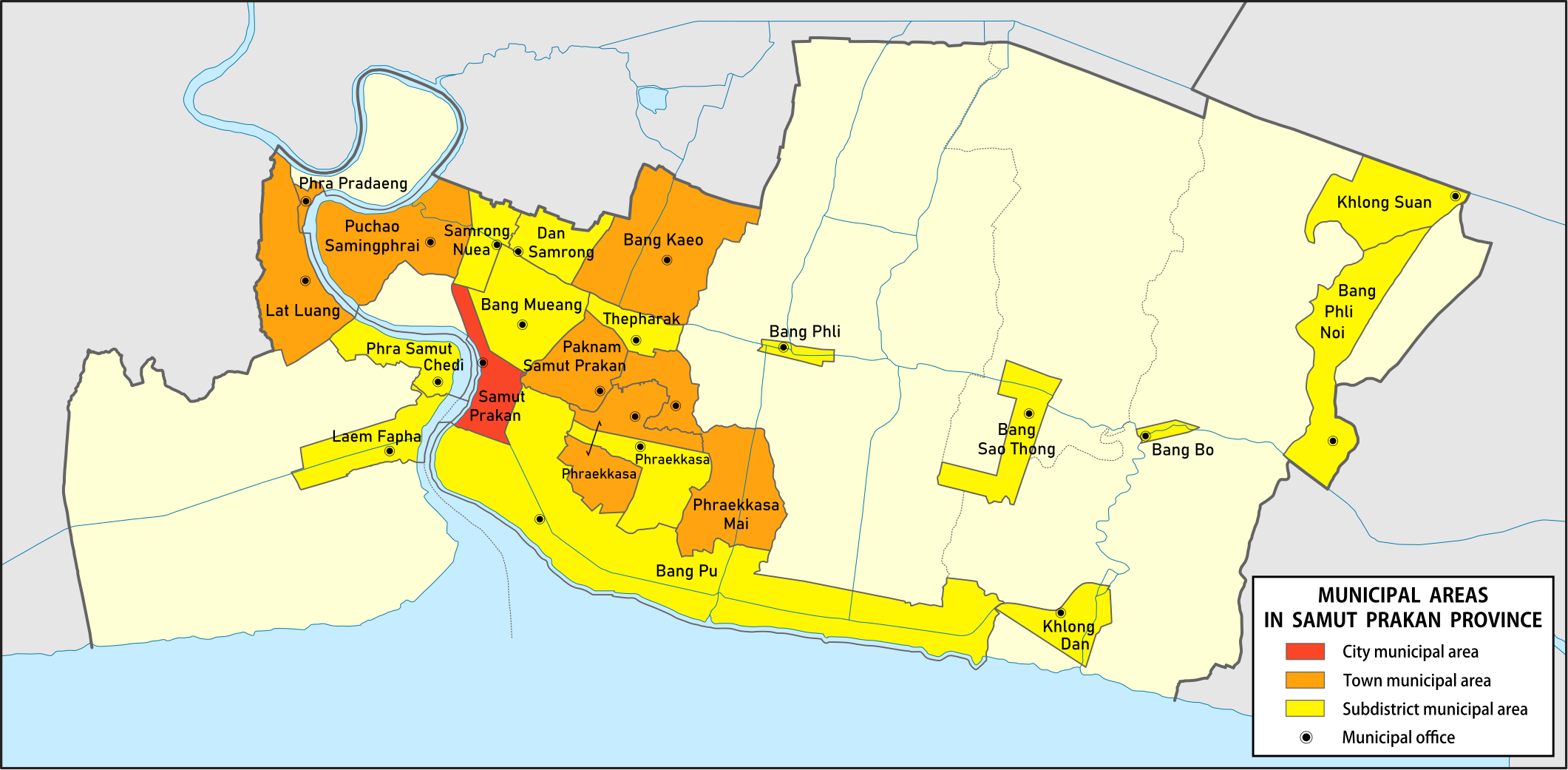
City municipalities (thesaban nakhon) Town municipalities (thesaban mueang) Subdistrict municipalities (thesaban tambon)

=== Provincial government ===
The province is divided into six districts (amphoes). The districts are further subdivided into 50 subdistricts (tambons) and 396 villages (mubans).

1. Mueang Samut Prakan
2. Bang Bo
3. Bang Phli
4. Phra Pradaeng
5. Phra Samut Chedi
6. Bang Sao Thong

=== Local government ===
As of 13 May 2020, there are: one Samut Prakan Provincial Administrative Organization - PAO (ongkan borihan suan changwat) and twenty-two municipal (thesaban) areas in the province. The capital Samut Prakan has city (thesaban nakhon) status. Further seven have town (thesaban mueang) status and fourteen subdistrict municipalities (thesaban tambon).

	City municipality	Population
1	Samut Prakan	50,843

	Town municipalities	Population	4	Praekkasa Mai	48,146
1	Puchao Samingphrai	73,232	5	Pak Nam Samut Prakan	35,050
2	Lat Luang	71,882	6	Phraekkasa	27,207
3	Bang Kaeo	59,548	7	Phra Pradaeng	9,338

	Subdistrict municipalities	Population			
1	Bang Pu	120,127	8	Laem Fapha	21,216
2	Bang Mueang	100,598	9	Phra Samut Chedi	12,391
3	Dan Samrong	55,488	10	Bang Phli	12,068
4	Phraekkasa	36,323	11	Khlong Dan	11,522
5	Samrong Nuea	30,498	12	Bang Phli Noi	9,155
6	Thepharak	22,312	13	Bang Bo	6,469
7	Bang Sao Thong	22,243	14	Khlong Suan	3,164

The non-municipal areas are administered by 26 Subdistrict Administrative Organizations (SAO) (ongkan borihan suan tambon).

Municipalities	Communities	Groups
Puchao Samingphrai	62	5
Lat Luang	42	3
Bang Kaeo	16	–
Pak Nam	24	–
Bang Pu	46	4
Bang Sao Thong	17	–
Bang Bo	10	–
Khlong Suan	10	–

For national elections, the province is divided into three voting districts, one represented by three assemblymen and the other two each by two assemblymen.

== Suvarnabhumi Airport ==
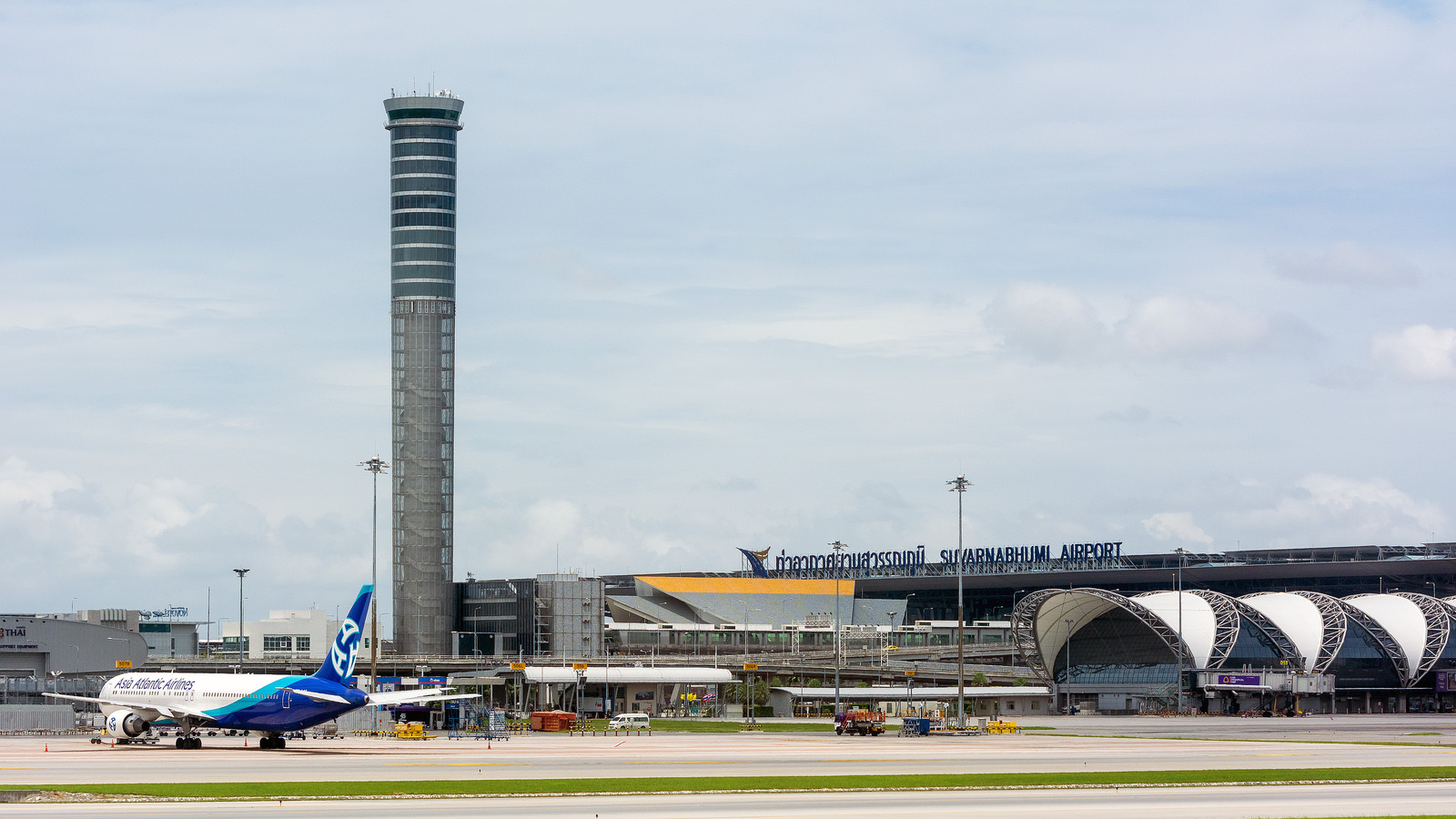
Suvarnabhumi Airport

Suvarnabhumi Airport (RTGS: Suwannaphum; Thai pronunciation: [sù.wān.ná.pʰūːm]) (IATA: BKK, ICAO: VTBS), also known as (New) Bangkok International Airport, is one of two international airports serving Bangkok. The other one is Don Mueang International Airport. Suvarnabhumi covers an area of 3,240 hectares (8,000 acres).

The airport is on what had formerly been known as Nong Nguhao (Cobra Swamp) in Racha Thewa in Bang Phli, Samut Prakan province, about 25 kilometres (16 mi) east of downtown Bangkok. The terminal building was designed by Helmut Jahn of Murphy / Jahn Architects. It was constructed primarily by ITO Joint Venture. The airport has the world's tallest free-standing control tower (132.2 metres or 434 feet), and the world's fourth largest single-building airport terminal, (563,000 square metres or 6,060,000 square feet).

Suvarnabhumi is the twentieth busiest airport in the world, the sixth busiest airport in Asia, and the busiest in the country, handling 63 million passengers in 2018, and is also a major air cargo hub, with a total of 95 airlines. On social networks, Suvarnabhumi was the world's most popular site for taking Instagram photographs in 2012.

The airport inherited the airport code, BKK, from Don Mueang after the older airport ceased international commercial flights. Motorway 7 connects the airport, Bangkok, and the heavily industrial eastern seaboard of Thailand, where most export manufacturing takes place.

== Bhumibol Bridge ==
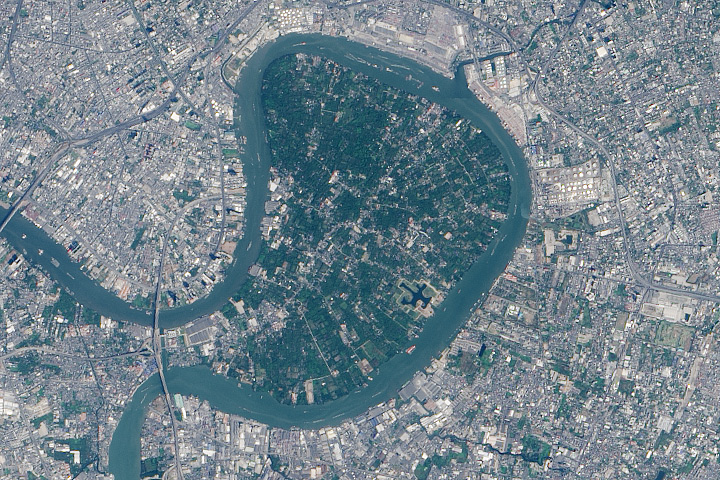
Bang Krachao

The Bhumibol Bridge (Thai: สะพานภูมิพล), also known as the Industrial Ring Road Bridge (Thai: สะพานวงแหวนอุตสาหกรรม) is part of the 13 km long Industrial Ring Road connecting southern Bangkok with Samut Prakan province. The bridge crosses the Chao Phraya River twice, with two cable-stayed spans of lengths of 702 m and 582 m supported by two diamond-shaped pylons 173 m and 164 m high. Where the two spans meet, another road rises to join them at a free-flowing interchange suspended 50 metres above the ground.

The bridge opened for traffic on 20 September 2006, before the official opening date of 5 December 2006. It is part of the Bangkok Industrial Ring Road, a royal scheme initiated by King Bhumibol Adulyadej that aims to solve traffic problems within Bangkok and surrounding areas, especially the industrial area around Khlong Toei Port, Southern Bangkok, and Samut Prakan province.

According to tradition, all the bridges over the Chao Phraya in Bangkok are named after a member of the royal family. In October 2009, it was announced that both bridges would be named after King Bhumibol Adulyadej, with the northern bridge officially named "Bhumibol 1 Bridge" and the southern bridge "Bhumibol 2 Bridge".

The structure of the Bhumibol Bridge consists of two parts:

- Bhumibol Bridge 1 crosses the northern part of Chao Praya River connecting Yan Nawa district, Bangkok and Song Khanong District, Samut Prakan. It is a cable-stayed bridge with seven lanes together with two high pillars. The structure is reinforced concrete 50 m above the river to enable the passage of ships.
- Bhumibol Bridge 2 is the one across the southern part of Chao Praya River connecting Song Khanong District and Bang Ya Phraek District. The structure is similar to Bhumibol Bridge 1, with seven lanes and two pillars built using reinforced concrete 50 m high.

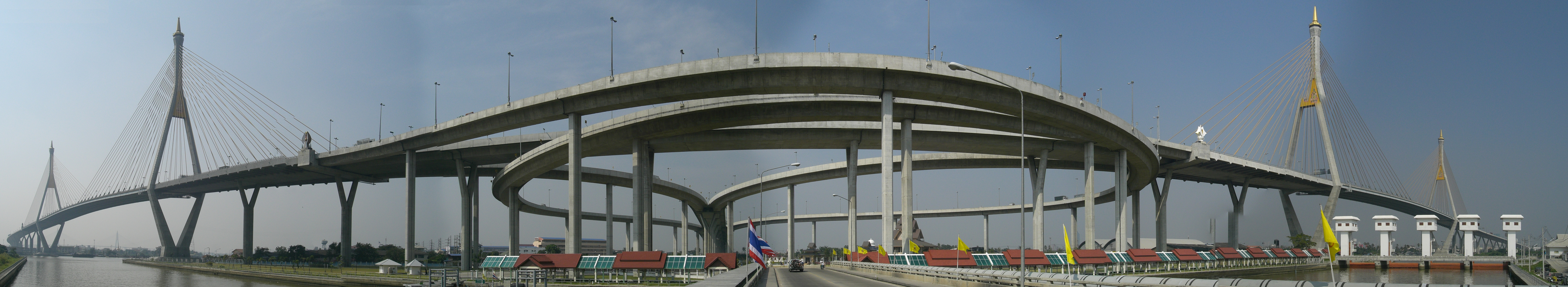
Bhumibol Bridge

== Economy ==
Nissan has two factories in the district, together employing 4,000 workers, 30% of them contract workers. Nissan-Thailand has an annual production capacity of 295,000 vehicles, making the Navara, Teana, Terra, Note, Almera, March, Sylphy and X-Trail models. Nissan plans to make 190,000 vehicles by the end of its fiscal year 2019, ending next March 2020. Roughly 120,000-130,000 units are pickup trucks, the remainder passenger cars. Nissan produces hybrid electric vehicles (HEVs) based on its e-Power technology and batteries for electric vehicles at a plant in Bang Sao Thong district. It has a production capacity of 370,000 vehicles a year.

Thai Theparos Public Co., Ltd., a leading Thai condiment manufacturer, has its headquarters in Thai Ban subdistrict, Mueang Samut Prakan district.

== Health ==
Samut Prakan's main hospital is Samut Prakan Hospital, a regional hospital operated by the Ministry of Public Health. Samut Prakan is also the location of Chakri Naruebodindra Medical Institute, a university hospital operated by the Faculty of Medicine Ramathibodi Hospital, Mahidol University.

== Human achievement index 2022 ==
Health	Education	Employment	Income
3	9	21	2
Housing	Family	Transport	Participation
75	51	14	77
Province Samut Prakan, with an HAI 2022 value of 0.6297 is "somewhat low", occupies place 53 in the ranking.

Since 2003, the United Nations Development Programme (UNDP) in Thailand has tracked progress on human development at sub-national level using the Human achievement index (HAI), a composite index covering eight key areas of human development. National Economic and Social Development Board (NESDB) has taken over this task since 2017.

Rank	Classification
1 - 13	"high"
14 - 29	"somewhat high"
30 - 45	"average"
46 - 61	"somewhat low"
62 - 77	"low"

Map of provinces and HAI 2022 rankings

== Gallery ==
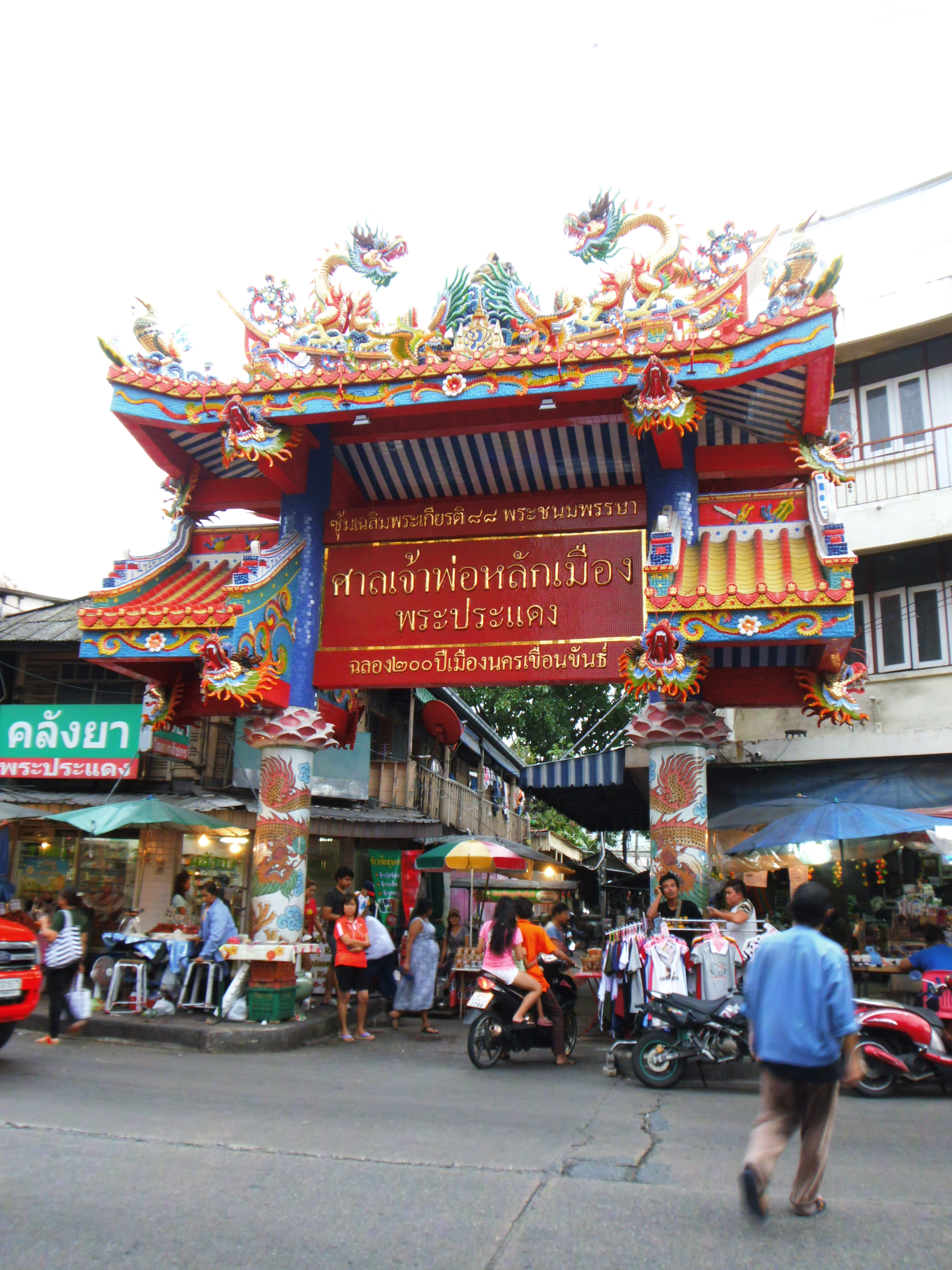
Lak Mueang Shrine, Phra Pradaeng

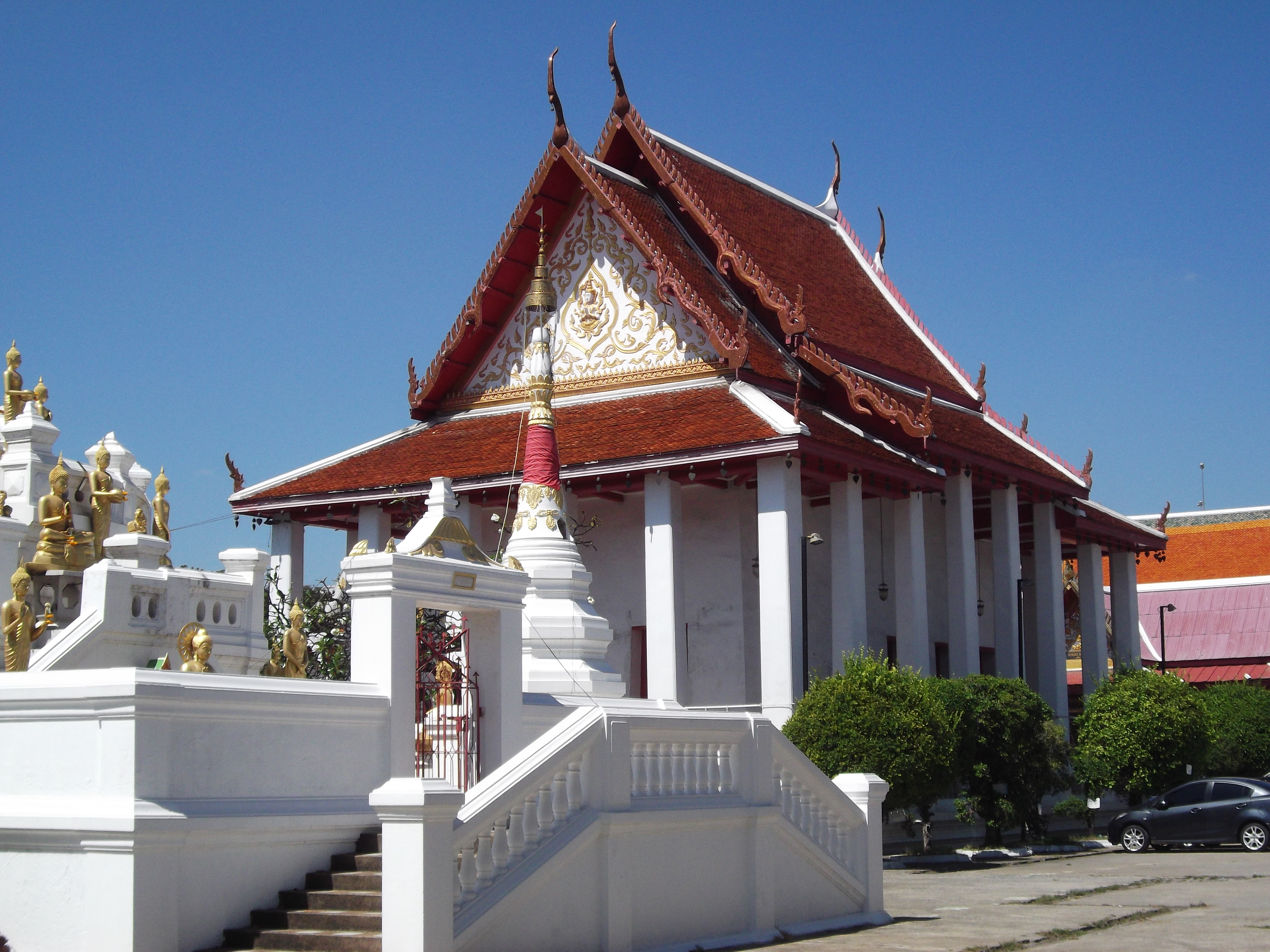
Wat Song Tham

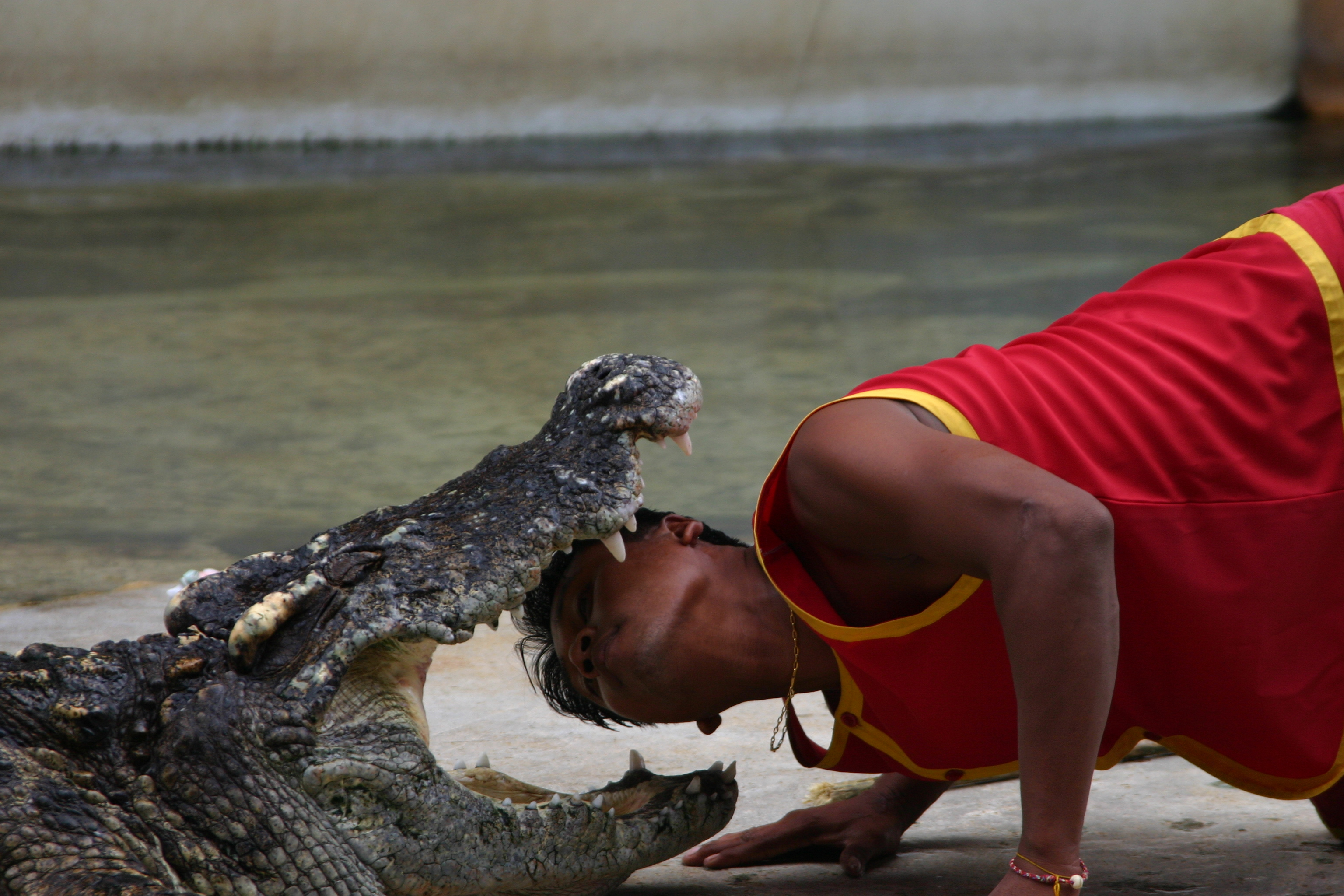
Samut Prakan Crocodile Farm and Zoo

== Trivia ==
Samut Prakan radiation accident
