= List of streets in George Town, Penang =

Plan of Beach Street and side streets

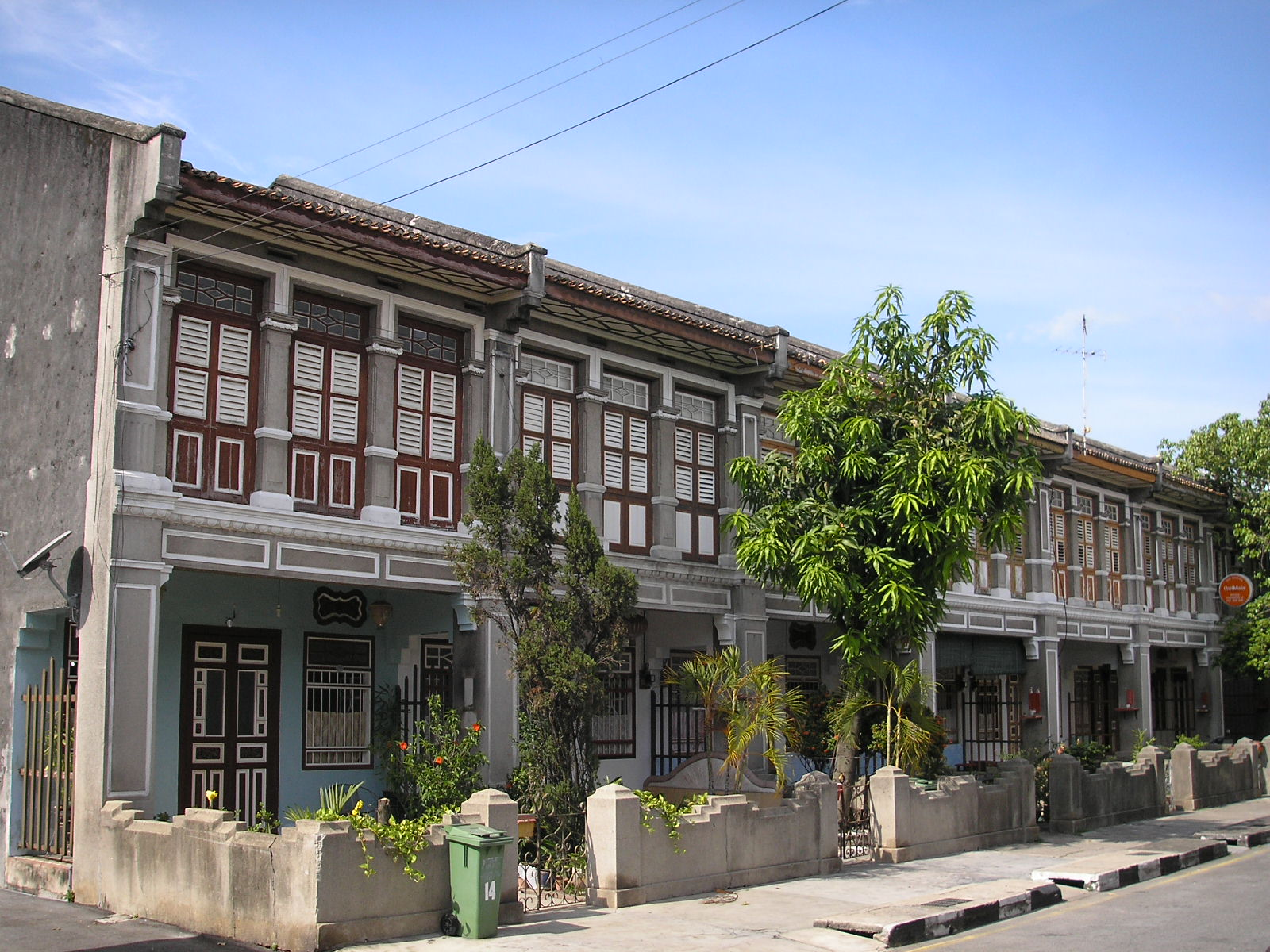
Old colonial buildings in a street in George Town, Penang, opposite the entrance to the Leong San Tong Khoo Kongsi temple

The street names of George Town reflect the multicultural heritage of the city, the capital of the former British settlement of Penang, now part of Malaysia.

Most streets in the city were built and named during the colonial era, and the historic English names generally remain and are still used by most Penangites. Since the passage of the National Language Act 1967, government policy has been to use the Malay language for all official purposes, and the Malay translations of the street names are the primary official versions that are used on street signs, now supplemented with names in English (and, in some places, Chinese, Tamil and Arabic).

== Changes in street names ==
Since independence, there have been some changes to the official names of some streets. On the whole, however, like Singapore and unlike many other cities in Malaysia, George Town has retained most of its colonial street names, although they used to be indicated on street signs only in their Malay translations.

Until 2007, street signs in George Town were only written in Malay, as a result of the national language policy. Unfortunately, this had the effect of confusing tourists, who found it difficult to match the English names commonly used by Penangites with the Malay names on street signs which were often very different. In the case of proper nouns, the English name is easily recognisable, e.g. Kimberley Street is Lebuh Kimberley. In other cases, however, the Malay translation may be unfamiliar to those who do not speak the language, e.g. Church St is literally translated as Lebuh Gereja (from the Portuguese igreja). A few streets have been given completely new names in Malay.

Even where official street names have changed, the local population have largely continued informally to use the old names when referring to streets. This is partly because the new names are often unwieldy (e.g. Green Lane vs Jalan Masjid Negeri, Pitt Street vs Jalan Masjid Kapitan Keling, or Northam Road vs Jalan Sultan Ahmad Shah), but also reflects a strong conservatism in the local population, who see Penang's colonial history as part of their local identity. When Scott Road was renamed Jalan D S Ramanathan, after the first Mayor of the City of George Town, the new street signs were repeatedly defaced and had to be replaced several times, eventually forcing the city authorities to fix a replacement street sign fifteen feet up a lamppost (instead of at waist-height, as was then usual).

== Street sign design ==
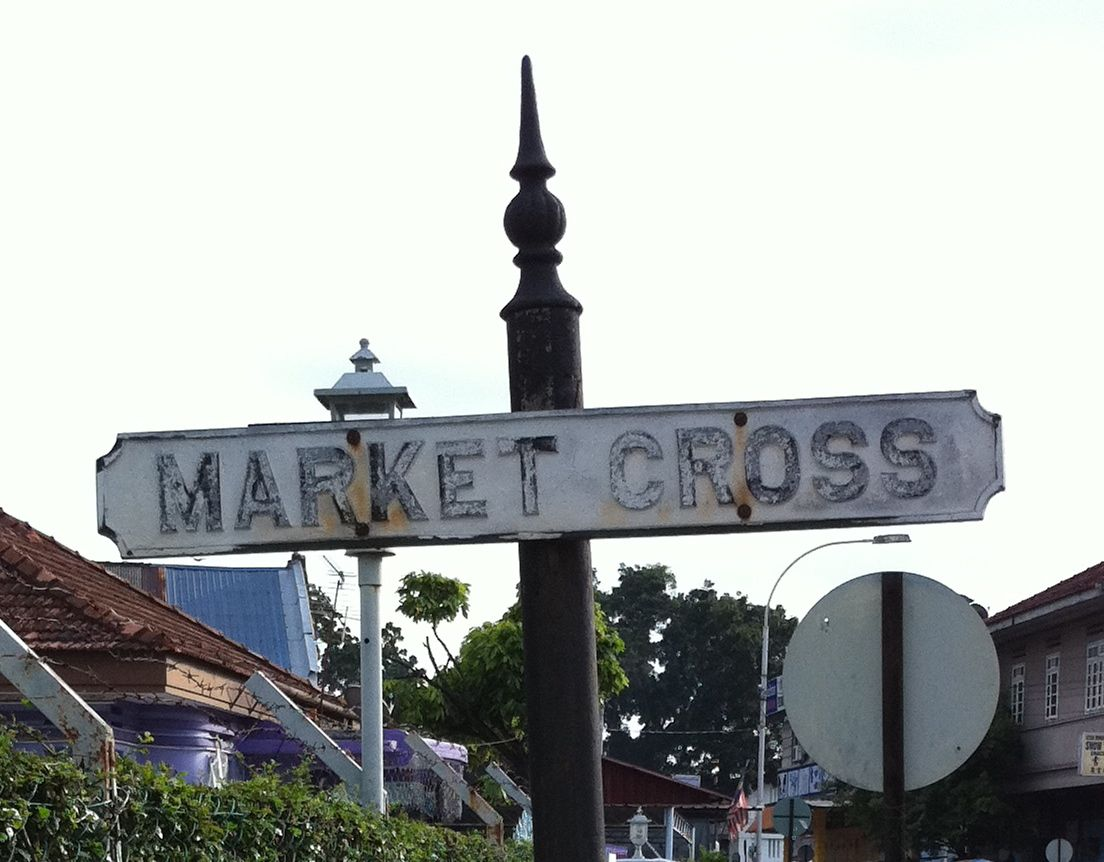
Colonial-era street sign at Market Cross

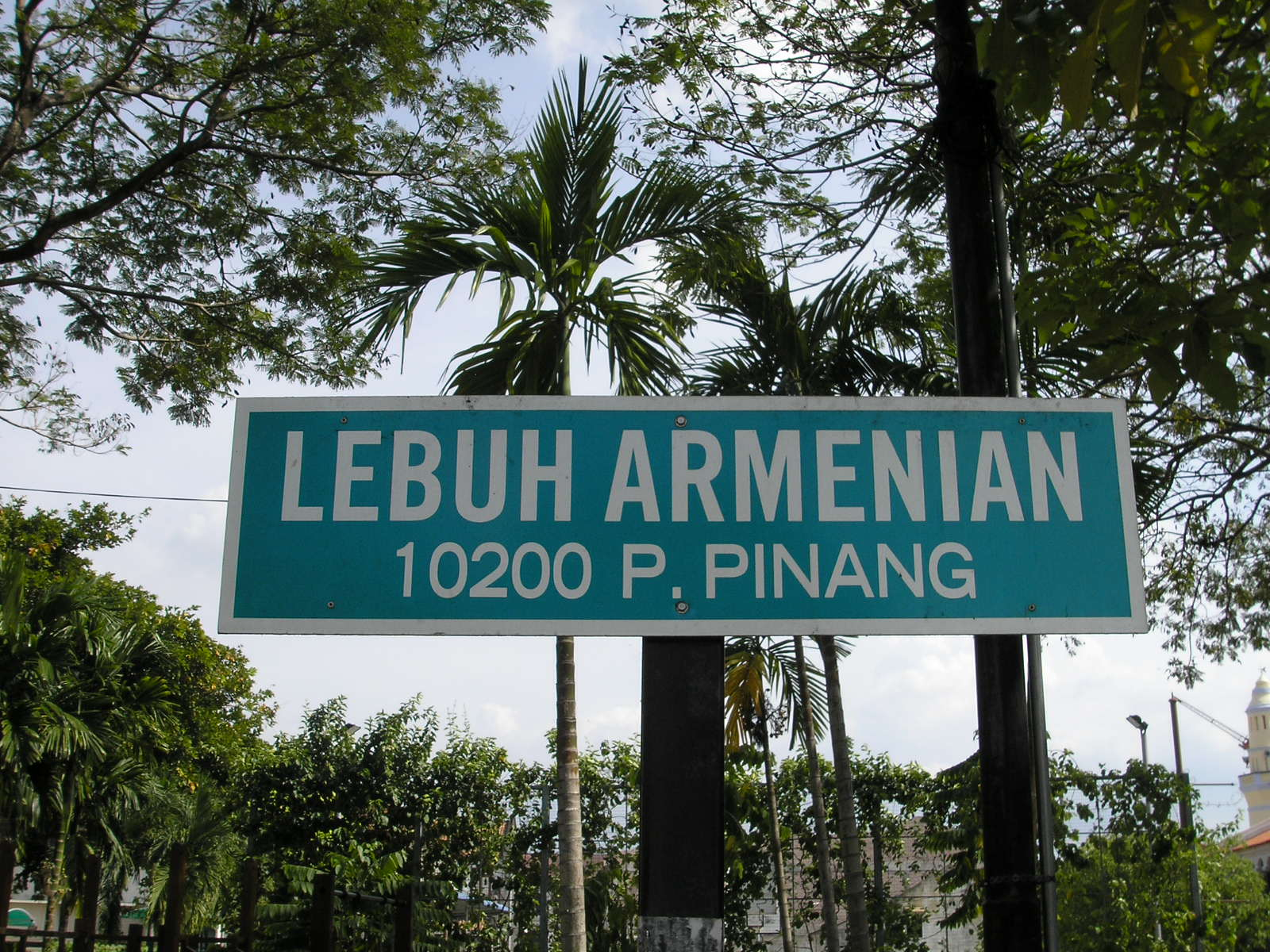
National-language street sign at Armenian Street (Lebuh Armenian)

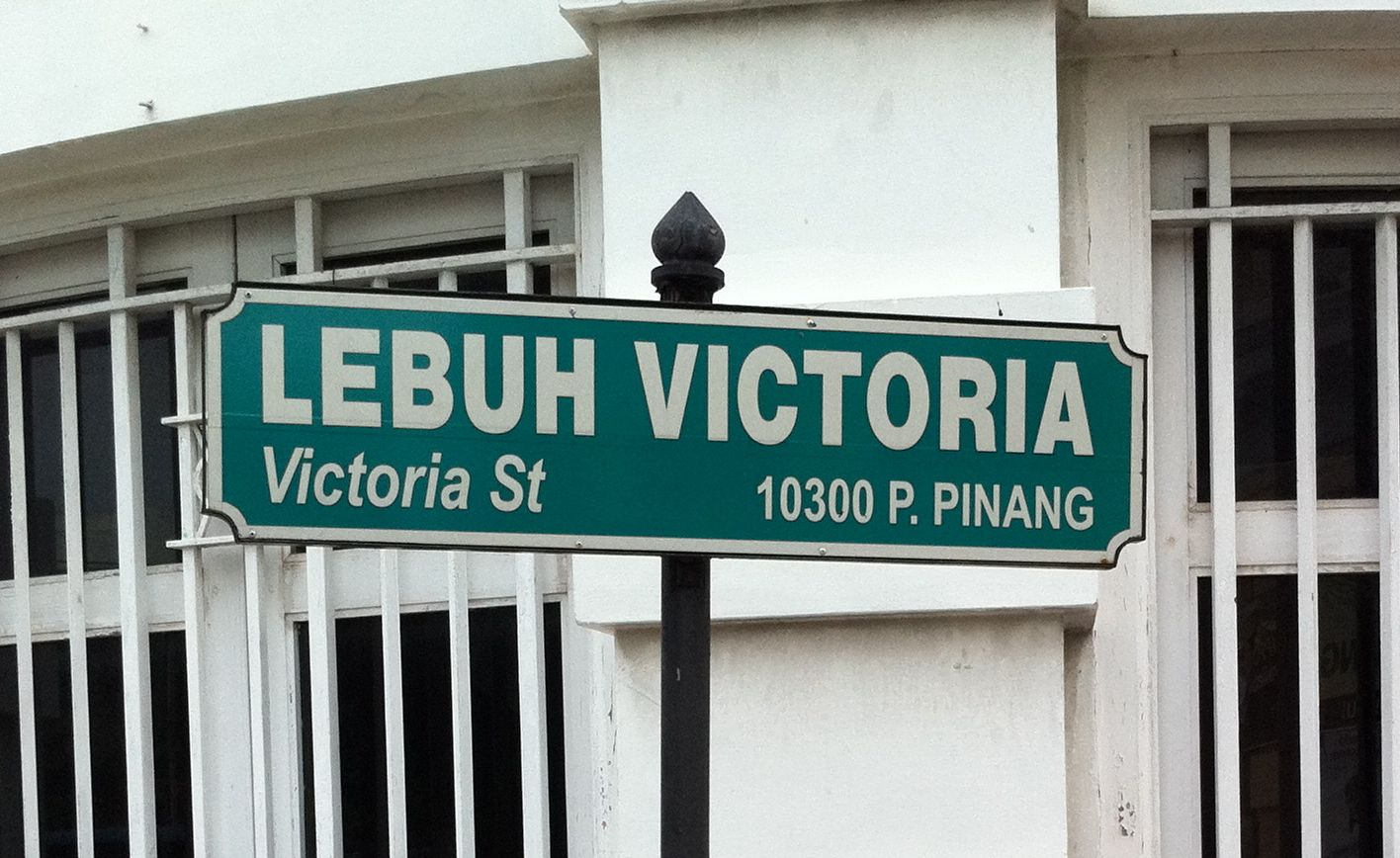
New bilingual street sign at Victoria Street (Lebuh Victoria)

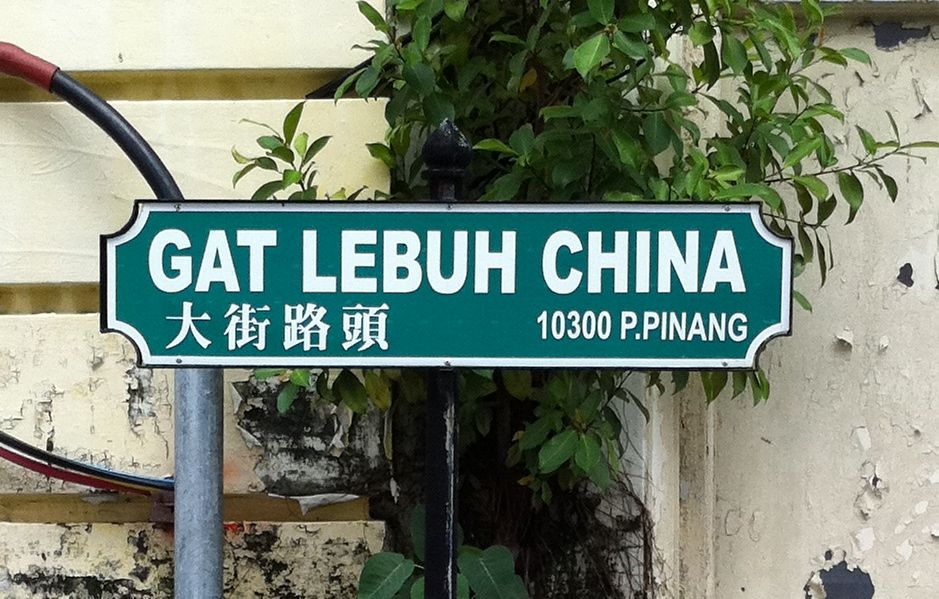
New multilingual street sign at China Street Ghaut (Gat Lebuh China)

The oldest street signs in the centre of George Town are rectangular and made of painted metal plate (blue with white lettering), usually affixed to corner shop-houses at the top of the ground floor, and many can still be seen. In the suburbs, rectangular cast-iron signs with indented corners (white with black lettering and edging) in English and sometimes Jawi script, fixed at head-height to a black iron pole surmounted with a finial, could also be seen. Almost all of these have been replaced by the modern road signs.

By 2007, rectangular reflective road signs (green with white lettering) in the Malay Rumi script had largely replaced the older signs. These were initially at waist-height, fixed to two black metal supports, and subsequently at head-height, fixed to a single black metal support. These signs also indicated the postal town and postcode.

Since 2007, new bilingual reflective street signs based on the old suburban signs have started to replace the Malay-only street signs. These are partly based on the old white signs, and are rectangular with indented corners (green with white lettering) and mounted at head-height to a black iron pole surmounted with an onion dome. The street name is given in Malay and English, together with the town and postcode.

In June 2007, while Penang was under the rule of Gerakan, street signs in Chinese were illegally set up by Penang's Democratic Action Party (DAP) Socialist Youth division along several roads in George Town under the justification it helps attract tourists from China, only to be removed by the Penang Municipal Council.

On July 22, 2008, following DAP's electoral victory in Penang and George Town's entry into UNESCO's World Heritage Site list, Gerakan was reported to have placed Chinese-language on existing street signs at six roads, claiming the signs were now vital with George Town's recognition by UNESCO and serve as a reminder to DAP of its earlier promises to erect such signs if voted into office. DAP Socialist Youth National Organizing secretary Koay Teng Hai had also proposed to include Tamil and Jawi translations, depending on the cultural background of the area, along with Chinese street names.

Despite opposition from Malay political parties and individuals at state and federal levels, the bilingual street signs with Chinese, Arabic and Tamil names were put up in November 2008. These multilingual road signs remain in use to this day.

== Standard translations ==
In translating the English words for street, road, lane, etc., the city authorities follow a fairly regular system to avoid confusion between many streets of similar names. There are exceptions to this rule where the historic Malay usage is different and there is no chance of confusion, e.g. Hutton Lane has always been known as Jalan Hutton (see e.g. the Mesjid Jalan Hatin (mosque) there) rather than *Lorong Hutton.

- Avenue - Lebuhraya (e.g. Peel Avenue/Lebuhraya Peel; context usually prevents confusion with the normal meaning of lebuhraya, viz. highway/expressway)
- Circus - Lilitan (e.g. Hargreaves Circus/Lilitan Hargreaves)
- Close - Solok (e.g. Scott Close/Solok Scott)
- Court - Halaman (e.g. Cantonment Court/Halaman Cantonment)
- Crescent - Lengkok (e.g. Jesselton Crescent/Lengkok Jesselton)
- Cross - Lintang (e.g. Burmah Cross/Lintang Burma)
- Drive - Persiaran (e.g. Gurney Drive/Persiaran Gurney)
- Gardens - Taman (e.g. Western Gardens/Taman Western)
- Lane - Lorong (e.g. Prangin Lane/Lorong Perangin)
- Place - Pesara/Laman (e.g. Claimant Place/Pesara Claimant)
- Quay - Pengkalan (e.g. Weld Quay/Pengkalan Weld)
- Road - Jalan (e.g. Perak Road/Jalan Perak)
- Square - Medan (e.g. College Square/Medan Maktab; also used for some new square-shaped roads that are not open squares, e.g. York Square/Medan York)
- Street - Lebuh (e.g. Campbell Street/Lebuh Campbell)
- Street Ghaut - Gat Lebuh (e.g. China Street Ghaut/Gat Lebuh China)
- Terrace - Tingkat (e.g. Erskine Terrace/Tingkat Erskine)

The word "Ghaut" at the end of some street names reflects the fact that they are extensions of the original streets beyond the original waterfront at Beach St with the reclamation of the Ghauts and the construction of Weld Quay, ghat being a Hindi and Bengali word meaning a flight of steps leading down to a body of water.

== List of street names ==
This list is by no means exhaustive. Road name changes (as opposed to translations) are marked in green.

English name	Official Malay name	Etymology	Traditional Malay name	Hokkien name	Hokkien etymology	Traditional Tamil name	Tamil etymology
Aboo Sittee Lane	Lorong Abu Siti	After Aboo Sittee @ Mamak Pushi, who founded the Malay opera form known as bangsawan in Penang in the 1870s	Lorong Pushi, after Mamak Pushi	三牲巷; Sam-seng-hāng	Gangsters' lane		
Acheen Street	Lebuh Acheh	After the Arab traders from Acheh who lived here.		拍石街; Phah-tsio̍h-ke 懸樓仔; Kuâinn-lâu-á	Stone-breaking street Small high tower (after the four-storied Gedung Atjeh at the Beach St corner)		
Acheen Street Ghaut	Gat Lebuh Acheh	After the Arab traders from Acheh who lived here.		拍石街路頭; Phah-tsio̍h-ke lōo-thâu 懸樓仔路頭; Kuâinn-lâu-á lōo-thâu	Acheen St landing place		
Adams Road	Jalan Adams	After Sir Arthur Adams (1861–1937), lawyer and Legislative Councillor.					
Ah Quee Street	Lebuh Ah Quee	After Capitan China Chung Keng Quee, who presented it to the Municipality	Lorong Takia, after the kampong that used to be there.	阿貴街; A-kuì-ke	Ah Quee street		
Amoy Lane	Lorong Amoy	After the Hokkien city of Amoy					
Anson Road	Jalan Anson	After Major-General Sir Archibald Anson, Lieutenant-Governor of Penang (1867–1882)					
Argus Lane	Lorong Argus	After Penang's first independent newspaper, the Pinang Argus, published at Argus House here from 1867 to 1873.		色藍乳禮拜堂後巷仔; Sek-lân-ní lé-paì-tn̄g-āu hāng-á	Lane behind the Eurasian (Serani) church (the Roman Catholic Church, now Cathedral, of the Assumption)		
Argyll Road	Jalan Argyll	Possibly after George Campbell, 8th Duke of Argyll, Secretary of State for India (1868–74).		萬葛里巷; Bang-ka-lí hāng	Bengali (or Sikh) lane		
Ariffin Road	Jalan Ariffin	After Haji Syed Ariffin, a Muslim alim in the 1880s and 1890s					
Armenian Street	Lebuh Armenian	After the Armenian Orthodox Church that used to be there.		W. of Cannon St		ஆர்மேனியன் வீதி Ārmēṉiyaṉ Vīti	After the Armenian Orthodox Church that used to be there.
Armenian Street	Lebuh Armenian	After the Armenian Orthodox Church that used to be there.		拍銅街; Phah-tâng-ke	Copper-beaters' street	ஆர்மேனியன் வீதி Ārmēṉiyaṉ Vīti	After the Armenian Orthodox Church that used to be there.
Armenian Street	Lebuh Armenian	After the Armenian Orthodox Church that used to be there.		E. of Cannon St		ஆர்மேனியன் வீதி Ārmēṉiyaṉ Vīti	After the Armenian Orthodox Church that used to be there.
Armenian Street	Lebuh Armenian	After the Armenian Orthodox Church that used to be there.		本頭公巷; Pún-thâu-kong-hāng 建元街; Kiàn-guân-ke	Gods' lane, after the Kong-si house of the Tuā Peh Kong or Kiàn Tek secret society (formerly at the junction of Armenian & Pitt Streets) there Kiàn Tek society origin street	ஆர்மேனியன் வீதி Ārmēṉiyaṉ Vīti	After the Armenian Orthodox Church that used to be there.
Armenian Street Ghaut	Gat Lebuh Armenian			本頭公巷路頭; Pún-thâu-kong-hāng lōo-thâu	Armenian St landing place	ஆர்மேனியன் வண்ணார் தெருவில் Ārmēṉiyaṉ Vaṇṇār Teruvil	Street of the dhobies in Armenian street
Arratoon Road	Jalan Arratoon	After the Armenian merchant Arathoon Anthony, the father of A. A. Anthony who founded the Penang stock-broking firm that bears his name, who came from Shiraz in Persia to Penang in 1819.					
Ayer Itam Road	Jalan Ayer Itam	After the Ayer Itam stream which flows there		亞也依淡路; A-iá i-tâm lōo	(phonetic)		
Ayer Rajah Road	Jalan Tunku Abdul Rahman	After the Telok Ayer Rajah, the bay between George Town and Tanjong Tokong. New Malay name after Tunku Abdul Rahman, first prime minister of Malaya (1957–1970), who lived there.					
Bagan Jermal Road	Jalan Bagan Jermal	After Bagan Jermal, where it leads		灣斗路; Uân-tó-lōo	Bay road		
Batu Lanchang Road	Jalan Tan Sri Teh Ewe Lim	After the area of Batu Lancang.					
Barrack Road	Jalan Barrack	After the sepoy barracks that used to be there		兵房路; Peng-pâng-lōo	Barrack road		
Beach Street	Lebuh Pantai	Self-describing. The street ran along the shoreline until the construction of Weld Quay.		N. of China St		பீச் வீதி Pīc Vīti	
Beach Street	Lebuh Pantai	Self-describing. The street ran along the shoreline until the construction of Weld Quay.		Jalan Gedung "Warehouse street" 土庫街; Thóo-khòo-ke	Warehouse street	பீச் வீதி Pīc Vīti	
Beach Street	Lebuh Pantai	Self-describing. The street ran along the shoreline until the construction of Weld Quay.		China St – Chulia St		பீச் வீதி Pīc Vīti	
Beach Street	Lebuh Pantai	Self-describing. The street ran along the shoreline until the construction of Weld Quay.		港仔口; Káng-á-kháu	Harbour entrance, where the main shipping business was carried out	பீச் வீதி Pīc Vīti	
Beach Street	Lebuh Pantai	Self-describing. The street ran along the shoreline until the construction of Weld Quay.		Chulia St – Armenian St		பீச் வீதி Pīc Vīti	
Beach Street	Lebuh Pantai	Self-describing. The street ran along the shoreline until the construction of Weld Quay.		中街; Tiong-ke	Middle street	பீச் வீதி Pīc Vīti	
Beach Street	Lebuh Pantai	Self-describing. The street ran along the shoreline until the construction of Weld Quay.		Armenian St – Acheen St		பீச் வீதி Pīc Vīti	
Beach Street	Lebuh Pantai	Self-describing. The street ran along the shoreline until the construction of Weld Quay.		緞羅申; Tuan-lōo-sîn	Tuan Losin (Tengku Syed Hussein)'s street	பீச் வீதி Pīc Vīti	
Beach Street	Lebuh Pantai	Self-describing. The street ran along the shoreline until the construction of Weld Quay.		Acheen St – Malay St		பீச் வீதி Pīc Vīti	
Beach Street	Lebuh Pantai	Self-describing. The street ran along the shoreline until the construction of Weld Quay.		拍鐵街; Phah-thi̍h-ke	Blacksmiths' street	பீச் வீதி Pīc Vīti	
Beach Street	Lebuh Pantai	Self-describing. The street ran along the shoreline until the construction of Weld Quay.		S. of Malay St		பீச் வீதி Pīc Vīti	
Beach Street	Lebuh Pantai	Self-describing. The street ran along the shoreline until the construction of Weld Quay.		Ujong Pasir "Beach end" 社尾; Siā-bué	Village end	பீச் வீதி Pīc Vīti	
Biggs Road	Jalan Biggs	After the Rev. Louis Coutier Biggs, colonial chaplain in Penang (1885–1897), who founded the St George's Chinese Mission (now St Paul's Church)				பிக்ஸ் வீதி Piks Vīti	After the Rev. Louis Coutier Biggs, colonial chaplain in Penang (1885–97), who founded the St George's Chinese Mission (now St Paul's Church)
Birch Road	Jalan Birch	After James Kortright Birch, Resident Councillor of Penang (1905–06) and Acting Resident Councillor from (3 March 1897 - August 1898, April 1901 - November 1902 and 1903–1905).					
Bishop Street	Lebuh Bishop	After the Roman Catholic Bishop Garnault, who was brought by Francis Light to Penang in 1786 from Kuala Kedah after fleeing persecution in Ligor and Phuket. His presbytery stood here.		W. of King St		பிஷப் வீதி Piṣap Vīti	After the Roman Catholic Bishop Garnault, who was brought by Francis Light to Penang in 1786 from Kuala Kedah after fleeing persecution in Ligor and Phuket. His presbytery stood here.
Bishop Street	Lebuh Bishop	After the Roman Catholic Bishop Garnault, who was brought by Francis Light to Penang in 1786 from Kuala Kedah after fleeing persecution in Ligor and Phuket. His presbytery stood here.		順德公司街; Sūn-tek kong-si-ke	Soon Teik Association street	பிஷப் வீதி Piṣap Vīti	After the Roman Catholic Bishop Garnault, who was brought by Francis Light to Penang in 1786 from Kuala Kedah after fleeing persecution in Ligor and Phuket. His presbytery stood here.
Bishop Street	Lebuh Bishop	After the Roman Catholic Bishop Garnault, who was brought by Francis Light to Penang in 1786 from Kuala Kedah after fleeing persecution in Ligor and Phuket. His presbytery stood here.		King St - Penang St		பிஷப் வீதி Piṣap Vīti	After the Roman Catholic Bishop Garnault, who was brought by Francis Light to Penang in 1786 from Kuala Kedah after fleeing persecution in Ligor and Phuket. His presbytery stood here.
Bishop Street	Lebuh Bishop	After the Roman Catholic Bishop Garnault, who was brought by Francis Light to Penang in 1786 from Kuala Kedah after fleeing persecution in Ligor and Phuket. His presbytery stood here.		呂宋禮拜堂前; Lū-sòng lé-pài-tn̂g-tsêng	In front of the Armenian (Luzon) church that used to be there	பிஷப் வீதி Piṣap Vīti	After the Roman Catholic Bishop Garnault, who was brought by Francis Light to Penang in 1786 from Kuala Kedah after fleeing persecution in Ligor and Phuket. His presbytery stood here.
Bishop Street	Lebuh Bishop	After the Roman Catholic Bishop Garnault, who was brought by Francis Light to Penang in 1786 from Kuala Kedah after fleeing persecution in Ligor and Phuket. His presbytery stood here.		E. of Penang St		பிஷப் வீதி Piṣap Vīti	After the Roman Catholic Bishop Garnault, who was brought by Francis Light to Penang in 1786 from Kuala Kedah after fleeing persecution in Ligor and Phuket. His presbytery stood here.
Bishop Street	Lebuh Bishop	After the Roman Catholic Bishop Garnault, who was brought by Francis Light to Penang in 1786 from Kuala Kedah after fleeing persecution in Ligor and Phuket. His presbytery stood here.		漆木街; Tshat-bok-ke 柴工街; Tshâ-kang-ke	Lacquerers' street Carpenters' street	பிஷப் வீதி Piṣap Vīti	After the Roman Catholic Bishop Garnault, who was brought by Francis Light to Penang in 1786 from Kuala Kedah after fleeing persecution in Ligor and Phuket. His presbytery stood here.
Boundary Road	Jalan Sempadan	Part of the road that formed part of the boundary of the City of George Town					
Brick Kiln Road	Jalan Gurdwara	After the brick kiln that used to be there. The area was known as Bakar Bata or 罇仔窰 Tsuínn-á-iô. New Malay name after the Sikh gurdwara there.	Bakar Bata "Brick Kiln"	風車路; Hong-tshia-lōo	Winnowing-machine road, after the winnowing machines used to separate rice from chaff.	செங்கல் சூளை சாலை Ceṅkal Cūḷai Cālai	After the brick kiln that used to be there
Bridge Street	Jalan C. Y. Choy	After the Anson Bridge over the Prangin Ditch and the bridge over the Pinang River, which it links. New Malay name after Cllr C. Y. Choy, the last Mayor of George Town (1964–1966).		North (Beach St) end			
Bridge Street	Jalan C. Y. Choy	After the Anson Bridge over the Prangin Ditch and the bridge over the Pinang River, which it links. New Malay name after Cllr C. Y. Choy, the last Mayor of George Town (1964–1966).		過港仔; Kuè-káng-á	Past the Prangin Ditch		
Bridge Street	Jalan C. Y. Choy	After the Anson Bridge over the Prangin Ditch and the bridge over the Pinang River, which it links. New Malay name after Cllr C. Y. Choy, the last Mayor of George Town (1964–1966).		Middle			
Bridge Street	Jalan C. Y. Choy	After the Anson Bridge over the Prangin Ditch and the bridge over the Pinang River, which it links. New Malay name after Cllr C. Y. Choy, the last Mayor of George Town (1964–1966).		枋廊; Pang-lông	Sawmill		
Bridge Street	Jalan C. Y. Choy	After the Anson Bridge over the Prangin Ditch and the bridge over the Pinang River, which it links. New Malay name after Cllr C. Y. Choy, the last Mayor of George Town (1964–1966).		South (Jelutong Rd) end			
Bridge Street	Jalan C. Y. Choy	After the Anson Bridge over the Prangin Ditch and the bridge over the Pinang River, which it links. New Malay name after Cllr C. Y. Choy, the last Mayor of George Town (1964–1966).		城隍廟路; Sêng-hông-biō-lōo	City god temple road		
Brown Road	Jalan Brown	After David Brown (1778–1825), an early settler and planter and at one time the largest landowner in Penang, to whom a memorial stands at Padang Brown (Dato' Kramat Gardens)					
Buckingham Street	Lebuh Buckingham	After Richard Temple-Grenville, 3rd Duke of Buckingham and Chandos, British Colonial Secretary (1867-8)		新街頭; Sin-ke-thâu	At the head of Campbell St	பக்கிங்காம் தெரு சந்தி Pakkiṅkām Teru Canti	Junction of Buckingham Street
Burmah Road	Jalan Burma	After the Burmese village (Kampong Ava) at Burmah Lane.	Jalan Kreta Ayer "Water-cart road"	車水路; Tshia-tsuí-lōo	Drawing-water road, after the aqueduct that ran along the road (see e.g. the Mesjid Tarek Ayer there)		
Campbell Street	Lebuh Campbell	After Sir George William Robert Campbell, Acting Lieutenant-Governor of Penang (1872–1873)	Jalan Nona Bahru "New maidens street"	新街; Sin-ke 新大門樓; Sin-tuā-muî-lâu	New street, alternatively 新雞 Sin-ke (new prostitutes), in contradistinction to Chulia St, where the brothels used to be New Chulia St		
Cannon Square	Medan Cannon	After the cannon that was brought in by the Government during the Penang Riots in 1867 and fired here, where the members of the Kiàn Tek society were encamped.		龍山堂內; Liông-san-tông-laī	Within Leong San Tong (the Khoo Kongsi clanhouse)		
Cannon Street	Lebuh Cannon	After the cannon that was brought in by the Government during the Penang Riots in 1867 and fired here, where the members of the Kiàn Tek society were encamped.		大銃空; Tuā-tshèng-khang	Cannonball-hole		
Cantonment Road	N. of Kelawei Rd	After the military cantonment at Sepoy Lines, to which it leads. The new Malay name of Cantonment Road Ghaut is after the Penang Malay Association (Persatuan Melayu Pulau Pinang, "Pemenang") there.					
Cantonment Road	Jalan Pemenang	After the military cantonment at Sepoy Lines, to which it leads. The new Malay name of Cantonment Road Ghaut is after the Penang Malay Association (Persatuan Melayu Pulau Pinang, "Pemenang") there.					
Cantonment Road	S. of Kelawei Rd	After the military cantonment at Sepoy Lines, to which it leads. The new Malay name of Cantonment Road Ghaut is after the Penang Malay Association (Persatuan Melayu Pulau Pinang, "Pemenang") there.					
Cantonment Road	Jalan Cantonment	After the military cantonment at Sepoy Lines, to which it leads. The new Malay name of Cantonment Road Ghaut is after the Penang Malay Association (Persatuan Melayu Pulau Pinang, "Pemenang") there.					
Carnarvon Lane	Lorong Carnarvon	After Henry Herbert, 4th Earl of Carnarvon, British Colonial Secretary (1866-7, 1874–1878) at the time of the Treaty of Pangkor.		鑑光內; Kàm-kong-laī	Within the village (kampung)		
Carnarvon Street	Lebuh Carnarvon	After Henry Herbert, 4th Earl of Carnarvon, British Colonial Secretary (1866-7, 1874–1878) at the time of the Treaty of Pangkor.		N. of Campbell St			Carnarvon Street
Carnarvon Street	Lebuh Carnarvon	After Henry Herbert, 4th Earl of Carnarvon, British Colonial Secretary (1866-7, 1874–1878) at the time of the Treaty of Pangkor.		大門樓橫街; Tuā-muî-lâu huâinn-ke	Chulia St cross street		Carnarvon Street
Carnarvon Street	Lebuh Carnarvon	After Henry Herbert, 4th Earl of Carnarvon, British Colonial Secretary (1866-7, 1874–1878) at the time of the Treaty of Pangkor.		Campbell St - Acheen St			Carnarvon Street
Carnarvon Street	Lebuh Carnarvon	After Henry Herbert, 4th Earl of Carnarvon, British Colonial Secretary (1866-7, 1874–1878) at the time of the Treaty of Pangkor.		番仔塚; Huan-á-thióng	Malay cemetery		Carnarvon Street
Carnarvon Street	Lebuh Carnarvon	After Henry Herbert, 4th Earl of Carnarvon, British Colonial Secretary (1866-7, 1874–1878) at the time of the Treaty of Pangkor.		S. of Acheen St			Carnarvon Street
Carnarvon Street	Lebuh Carnarvon	After Henry Herbert, 4th Earl of Carnarvon, British Colonial Secretary (1866-7, 1874–1878) at the time of the Treaty of Pangkor.		畓田仔; Lam-tshân-á 姓張公司街; Sènn-tionn kong-si-ke 十間厝; Tsa̍p-keng-tshù 四角井; Sì-kak-tsénn	Swamp fields Teoh clanhouse street Ten houses Square well		Carnarvon Street
Caunter Hall Road	Jalan P. Ramlee	After Caunter Hall, the house of George Caunter, Acting Superintendent of Prince of Wales Island (1797) who was deputed to Kedah to negotiate the purchase of Province Wellesley, there. New Malay name after Malayan filmmaker P. Ramlee					
Cecil Street	Lebuh Cecil	After Sir Cecil Clementi Smith, Governor of the Straits Settlements (1887–93).		(過港仔第)七條路 (Kuè-káng-á tē) Tshit-tiâu-lōo	7th road (past the Prangin Ditch)		
Ceylon Lane	Lorong Ceylon	After the Ceylonese inhabitants		四十間; Sì-tsa̍p-keng	Forty houses	இலங்கை வீதி Ilaṅkai Vīti	After the Tamil Sri Lankans inhabitants
Cheapside	Cheapside	After Cheapside, a street in London where one of the city's main produce markets was located.					
Che Em Lane	Lorong Che Em	After Chee Eam @ Chu Yan, a Chinese merchant named as the largest Chinese property owner by Francis Light in 1793. Known in Tamil as Koli Kadai Sandhu		北間內; Pak-kan-laī	Within the town (pekan)	கோழி கடை சந்தை Kōḻi Kaṭai Cantai	After a Poultry market that exist there. During that time, Che Em Lane was the centre for poultry hawkers.
China Street	Lebuh China	After the Chinese inhabitants		大街; Tuā-ke	Main street		
China Street Ghaut	Gat Lebuh China	After the Chinese inhabitants		大街路頭; Tuā-ke lōo-thâu 明山路頭; Bêng-san lōo-thâu	China St landing place (Khoo) Beng San (shop) landing place		
Chowrasta Road	Jalan Chowrasta	After the chowrasta or "four crossroads" market there		吉寧仔萬山; Kiat-lêng-á bān-san (also Tamil St)	Indian market		
Chow Thye Road	Jalan Chow Thye	After Loke Chow Thye (died 1931), a prominent Selangor miner who was educated at the Penang Free School.					
Chulia Lane	Lorong Chulia	After the Tamil inhabitants, then known as Chulias after the ancient Tamil kingdom of Chola		十七間; Tsap-tshi̍t-keng	Seventeen houses, after the row of seventeen houses of the same size there.		
Chulia Street	Lebuh Chulia	After the Tamil inhabitants, then known as Chulias after the ancient Tamil kingdom of Chola		W. of Love Lane		கலிங்க வீதி Kaliṅka Vīti	After the ancient Tamil kingdom of Chola or Kalinga
Chulia Street	Lebuh Chulia	After the Tamil inhabitants, then known as Chulias after the ancient Tamil kingdom of Chola		牛干冬; Gû-kan-tàng	Cattle pen (kendang)	கலிங்க வீதி Kaliṅka Vīti	After the ancient Tamil kingdom of Chola or Kalinga
Chulia Street	Lebuh Chulia	After the Tamil inhabitants, then known as Chulias after the ancient Tamil kingdom of Chola		Love Lane - Pitt St		கலிங்க வீதி Kaliṅka Vīti	After the ancient Tamil kingdom of Chola or Kalinga
Chulia Street	Lebuh Chulia	After the Tamil inhabitants, then known as Chulias after the ancient Tamil kingdom of Chola		大門樓; Tuā-muî-lâu	Great archway, after the two archways into a large compound house that used to be here: see Sek Chuan Lane	கலிங்க வீதி Kaliṅka Vīti	After the ancient Tamil kingdom of Chola or Kalinga
Chulia Street	Lebuh Chulia	After the Tamil inhabitants, then known as Chulias after the ancient Tamil kingdom of Chola		E. of Pitt St		கலிங்க வீதி Kaliṅka Vīti	After the ancient Tamil kingdom of Chola or Kalinga
Chulia Street	Lebuh Chulia	After the Tamil inhabitants, then known as Chulias after the ancient Tamil kingdom of Chola		羅粦街; Lôo-lîn-ke 吉寧仔街; Kiat-lêng-á-ke (now usually Market St)	(H. M.) Noordin (shop) street Indian street	கலிங்க வீதி Kaliṅka Vīti	After the ancient Tamil kingdom of Chola or Kalinga
Chulia Street Ghaut	Gat Lebuh Chulia	After the Tamil inhabitants, then known as Chulias after the ancient Tamil kingdom of Chola		吉寧仔街路頭; Kiat-lêng-á-ke lōo-thâu 姓楊公司街; Sènn-iônn-kong-si-ke 柴路頭; Tshâ lōo-thâu 大水井; Tuā-tsuí-tsénn (also Pitt St (middle))	Chulia St landing place Yeoh clanhouse street Firewood landing place, where firewood used to be sold before Maxwell Rd was constructed Great well, after the big water tank that used to be there		
Church Street	Lebuh Gereja	After the Portuguese Eurasian church located here in the late 18th century.		義興街; Gī-hin-ke	Ghee Hin secret society street, after the association house that used to stand there.	சர்ச் வீதி Tēvālayam Vīti	After the Portuguese Eurasian church located here in the late 18th century.
Church Street Ghaut	Gat Lebuh Gereja	After the Portuguese Eurasian church located here in the late 18th century.		義興街路頭; Gī-hin-ke lōo-thâu 酒廊路頭; Tsiu-lōng lōo-thâu	Church St landing place Distillery landing-place, after the distillery operated at the junction of Church and Beach Sts by the Opium and Spirit Farm Offices.		
Cintra Street	Lebuh Cintra	After the Portuguese town of Sintra.		新街橫街; Sin-ke huâinn-ke 拍袍街; Phah-phâu-ke	China St cross street Brothel street, where the brothels of the lowest type were.		
Cintra Street	Lebuh Cintra	After the Portuguese town of Sintra.		N. of Campbell St			
Cintra Street	Lebuh Cintra	After the Portuguese town of Sintra.		日本街; Ji̍t-pún-ke	Japanese (brothel) street		
Claimant Place	Pesara Claimant	Supposedly after the claimant in the Tichborne Case		萬安臺街; Bān-an-tâi-ke			
Clarke Street	Lebuh Clarke	After Major-General Sir Andrew Clarke, Governor of the Straits Settlements (1873–1875)					
Clove Hall Road	Jalan Clove Hall	After the nearby residence of the Armenian Anthony family (see Arratoon Rd)					
Codrington Avenue	Lebuhraya Codrington	After Stewart Codrington, President of the Municipal Commissioners of George Town and Acting Resident Councillor of Penang (1924)					
Cross Street	Lebuh Lintang	Self-describing. It used to cross from Gladstone Rd to Magazine Rd.					
Dato Keramat Road	Jalan Dato' Keramat	After the Dato' Kramat village, to which it led, named after an early-18th-century Muslim ascetic		W. of Patani Rd			
Dato Keramat Road	Jalan Dato' Keramat	After the Dato' Kramat village, to which it led, named after an early-18th-century Muslim ascetic		四崁店; Sì-khám-tiàm	Four shops		
Dato Keramat Road	Jalan Dato' Keramat	After the Dato' Kramat village, to which it led, named after an early-18th-century Muslim ascetic		E. of Patani Rd			
Dato Keramat Road	Jalan Dato' Keramat	After the Dato' Kramat village, to which it led, named after an early-18th-century Muslim ascetic		柑仔園; Kam-á-huînn	Mandarin orange plantation, after a former orange plantation there. The area was known in Malay as Kebun Limau		
Dickens Street	Lebuh Dickens	After John Dickens, judge and magistrate of Prince of Wales Island (appointed 1801)					
Downing Street	Lebuh Downing	After Downing Street in London, the seat of government.		外關; Guā-kuan 大人關; Tāi-jîn-kuan	Overseas Chinese protector's office		
Drury Lane	Lorong Drury	After Drury Lane in London (where the Theatre Royal is) because of the Chinese theatre there.		新戲臺; Sin-hì-tâi	New Chinese theatre		
Duke Street	Lebuh Duke	After Prince Alfred, Duke of Edinburgh, who visited and stayed here in 1869.					
Dundas Court (no longer extant)		After Philip Dundas, Lieutenant-Governor of Penang (1805–1807). The road was a cul-de-sac opposite Leith St Ghaut, but was demolished when Northam Rd was extended to create the Farquhar St-Northam Rd one-way system.					
W. of Fort Point	Jalan Tun Syed Sheh Barakbah	Self-describing. Fort Rd was the eastern section of the road leading from the tip of the cape, Fort Point, to the Jubilee Clock Tower roundabout. Both The Esplanade and Fort Rd were joined with the new road built west of Duke St to form a road named after Tun Syed Sheh Barakbah, Governor of Penang (1969–1975).		舊關仔角; Kū-kuan-á-kak (also King Edward Place)	Old government corner - see also King Edward Place. When Gurney Drive was built, it was called the new Esplanade, or new government corner, even though there are no government buildings there.		
The Esplanade	Jalan Tun Syed Sheh Barakbah	Self-describing. Fort Rd was the eastern section of the road leading from the tip of the cape, Fort Point, to the Jubilee Clock Tower roundabout. Both The Esplanade and Fort Rd were joined with the new road built west of Duke St to form a road named after Tun Syed Sheh Barakbah, Governor of Penang (1969–1975).		舊關仔角; Kū-kuan-á-kak (also King Edward Place)	Old government corner - see also King Edward Place. When Gurney Drive was built, it was called the new Esplanade, or new government corner, even though there are no government buildings there.		
S. of Fort Point	Jalan Tun Syed Sheh Barakbah	Self-describing. Fort Rd was the eastern section of the road leading from the tip of the cape, Fort Point, to the Jubilee Clock Tower roundabout. Both The Esplanade and Fort Rd were joined with the new road built west of Duke St to form a road named after Tun Syed Sheh Barakbah, Governor of Penang (1969–1975).		舊關仔角; Kū-kuan-á-kak (also King Edward Place)	Old government corner - see also King Edward Place. When Gurney Drive was built, it was called the new Esplanade, or new government corner, even though there are no government buildings there.		
Fort Road	Jalan Tun Syed Sheh Barakbah	Self-describing. Fort Rd was the eastern section of the road leading from the tip of the cape, Fort Point, to the Jubilee Clock Tower roundabout. Both The Esplanade and Fort Rd were joined with the new road built west of Duke St to form a road named after Tun Syed Sheh Barakbah, Governor of Penang (1969–1975).		舊關仔角; Kū-kuan-á-kak (also King Edward Place)	Old government corner - see also King Edward Place. When Gurney Drive was built, it was called the new Esplanade, or new government corner, even though there are no government buildings there.		
New section W. of Duke St	Jalan Tun Syed Sheh Barakbah	Self-describing. Fort Rd was the eastern section of the road leading from the tip of the cape, Fort Point, to the Jubilee Clock Tower roundabout. Both The Esplanade and Fort Rd were joined with the new road built west of Duke St to form a road named after Tun Syed Sheh Barakbah, Governor of Penang (1969–1975).		舊關仔角; Kū-kuan-á-kak (also King Edward Place)	Old government corner - see also King Edward Place. When Gurney Drive was built, it was called the new Esplanade, or new government corner, even though there are no government buildings there.		
Jalan Tun Syed Sheh Barakbah	Jalan Tun Syed Sheh Barakbah	Self-describing. Fort Rd was the eastern section of the road leading from the tip of the cape, Fort Point, to the Jubilee Clock Tower roundabout. Both The Esplanade and Fort Rd were joined with the new road built west of Duke St to form a road named after Tun Syed Sheh Barakbah, Governor of Penang (1969–1975).		舊關仔角; Kū-kuan-á-kak (also King Edward Place)	Old government corner - see also King Edward Place. When Gurney Drive was built, it was called the new Esplanade, or new government corner, even though there are no government buildings there.		
Esplanade Road	Jalan Padang Kota Lama	Road leading from Light St to the Esplanade		草埔海墘路; Tsháu-poo haí-kinn-lōo	Grass field (cricket ground) shorefront road		
Farquhar Street	Lebuh Farquhar	After R. T. Farquhar, Lieutenant-Governor of Penang (1804–1805)		W. of Leith St			
Farquhar Street	Lebuh Farquhar	After R. T. Farquhar, Lieutenant-Governor of Penang (1804–1805)		紅毛路; Âng-môo-lōo (also Northam Rd, to which it joins)	European road		
Farquhar Street	Lebuh Farquhar	After R. T. Farquhar, Lieutenant-Governor of Penang (1804–1805)		Leith St - Love Lane			
Farquhar Street	Lebuh Farquhar	After R. T. Farquhar, Lieutenant-Governor of Penang (1804–1805)		蓮花河; Liân-hua-hô 色蘭乳學前; Sek-lân-ní-o̍h-tsêng	Lotus-flower pond, after a lotus-pond at the side of the old St George's Girls' School, which was filled up on account of many accidents involving people trying to get at the lotus. In front of the Eurasian (Serani) school (St Xavier's Institution)		
Farquhar Street	Lebuh Farquhar	After R. T. Farquhar, Lieutenant-Governor of Penang (1804–1805)		E. of Love Lane			
Farquhar Street	Lebuh Farquhar	After R. T. Farquhar, Lieutenant-Governor of Penang (1804–1805)		紅毛學前; Âng-môo-o̍h-tsêng	In front of the European (old Penang Free) School		
Fish Lane	Lorong Ikan			鹹魚仔巷; Kiâm-hû-á-hāng	Salted fish lane, lane off Prangin Lane	மீன் வீதி Mīṉ Vīti	Fish Lane, because this street is famous for laying out salted fish to dry
Free School Road	Jalan Free School	After the new Penang Free School there.					
Gaol Road	Jalan Penjara	After the Penang Gaol there.		新跤樞; Sin-kha-khu	New prison	புதிய சிறைச்சாலை Putiya Ciṟaiccālai	After the Jail located there
Gladstone Road (no longer extant)	Jalan Gladstone	After William Ewart Gladstone (1809–98), British prime minister. The western end of Gladstone Rd, where it joined Magazine Circus, was demolished with the construction of KOMTAR in 1985, and the remainder was demolished around 2000 with the building of Prangin Mall.		火車路; Hué-tshia-lōo	Tram road		
Glugor Road	Jalan Sultan Azlan Shah	After the area of Glugor, and the 19th century Glugor Estate of David Brown, where it leads, named after the assam glugor (tamarind) tree.				குளுகோர் வீதி Kuḷukōr Vīti	Gelugor Road : After the area of Glugor, and the 19th century Glugor Estate.
Gottlieb Road	Jalan Gottlieb	After Felix Henry Gottlieb, a lawyer who served in the Straits Settlements government from 1846 to 1882					
Green Hall	Jalan Green Hall			緞巴尼; Tuān pá-lí 麒麟虎; Ki-lin hōo	Mr (Tuan) Paddy's (land) (phonetic)	உப்புகாரன் தெரு Uppukāraṉ teru	Meaning "salt traders' street. Salt trading widely occur here and controlled by Indians.
Green Lane	Jalan Masjid Negeri	Formerly self-describing. New Malay name after the state mosque there.		青草巷; Tshenn-tsháu-hāng	Green grass lane		
Gurney Drive	Pesiaran Gurney	After Sir Henry Gurney, High Commissioner of the Federation of Malaya (1950–1951) assassinated during the Malayan Emergency.		新關仔角; Sin-kuan-á-kak	New Government Office Corner, i.e. New Esplanade.		
Halfway Road	Jalan Sekerat						
Hargreaves Road	Jalan Hargreaves	After W Hargreaves (died 1939), a former principal of the Penang Free School.					
Herriot Street	Lebuh Herriot	After Stuart Herriot, British merchant who wrote the petition of the Capitan China, Chung Keng Kwee, and others in 1872, asking for British intervention in Perak after the Larut Riots.		(過港仔第)八條路 (Kuè-káng-á tē) Peh-tiâu-lōo	8th road (past the Prangin Ditch)		
Hogan Road	Jalan Hogan	After R. A. P. Hogan, a prominent Penang lawyer in the 1870s					
Hong Kong Street	Jalan Cheong Fatt Tze	After the island of Hong Kong. New Malay name after Cheong Fatt Tze, 19th century merchant and Chinese consul in Penang, despite the fact that the famous Cheong Fatt Tze mansion is not here, but on Leith St.		香港街; Hiang-káng-ke	Hong Kong street		
Hospital Road	Jalan Hospital	After the Penang General Hospital there		病厝路; Pēnn-tshù-lōo	Hospital road		
Hutton Lane	Jalan Hutton	After Dr Hutton, one of the first doctors in Penang, who arrived in 1805.		惹蘭亞丁; Gia-lân-a-teng	(phonetic)		
Jahudi Road	Jalan Zainal Abidin	After the former Jewish inhabitants and the Jewish cemetery that is still there.					
Jelutong Road	Jalan Jelutong	After the Jelutong village at the junction with Perak Rd, named after the Jelutong tree.		日落洞路; Ji̍t-lo̍h-tong-lōo	(phonetic)		
Jelutong Road	Jalan Jelutong	After the Jelutong village at the junction with Perak Rd, named after the Jelutong tree.		Town end			
Jelutong Road	Jalan Jelutong	After the Jelutong village at the junction with Perak Rd, named after the Jelutong tree.		下洞; Ēe-tong	Lower Jelutong road		
Jelutong Road	Jalan Jelutong	After the Jelutong village at the junction with Perak Rd, named after the Jelutong tree.		Jelutong end			
Jelutong Road	Jalan Jelutong	After the Jelutong village at the junction with Perak Rd, named after the Jelutong tree.		頂洞; Téng-tong 上洞; Siāng-tong	Upper Jelutong road		
Kampong Deli	Kampung Deli	After the inhabitants from Deli, Medan.					
Kampong Kaka	Jalan Kampung Kaka	After the Malabarese Muslim (Kaka) inhabitants.					
Kampong Kolam	Jalan Kampung Kolam	After the large granite pool that stood there in the compound of the Kapitan Kling mosque.					
Kampong Malabar	Lorong Kampung Malabar	After the Malabarese inhabitants		日本新路; Ji̍t-pún-sin-lōo	New Japanese road		
Katz Street	Lebuh Katz	After the importing agents, Katz Brothers Ltd, established in 1864.		(過港仔第)六條路 (Kuè-káng-á tē) La̍k-tiâu-lōo	6th road (past the Prangin Ditch)		
Kedah Road	Jalan Kedah	After the neighbouring Malay state of Kedah	Kampong Melaka, after the kampong there.	鑑光麻六甲; Kām-kong mâ-la̍k-kah	Malaccan village.		
Kelawei Road	Jalan Kelawei	From Kuala Awal, the first estuary west of George Town					
Keng Kwee Street	Lebuh Keng Kwee	After Capitan China Chung Keng Quee, who built the street and connected it with Penang Rd.		景貴街; Kéng-kuì-ke	Keng Kwee street		
Khoo Sian Ewe Road	Jalan Khoo Sian Ewe	After Khoo Sian Ewe (1886-1964), President of the Penang Chinese Town Hall, philanthropist and Straits Settlements Legislative Councillor					
Kimberley Street	Lebuh Kimberley	After John Wodehouse, 1st Earl of Kimberley, British Colonial Secretary (1870–1874, 1880–1882).		汕頭街; Suann-thâu-ke 潮州街; Tiô-tsiu-ke 麵線街; Mī-suànn-ke 姓鄧公司街; Sènn-tenn-kong-si-ke 拍索仔巷; Phah-soh-á-hāng (also Rope Walk)	Swatow street Teochew street, after the Teochew prostitutes from Swatow that used to work there Rice-vermicelli makers' street Teh clanhouse street Ropemakers' street		
King Edward Place	Pesara King Edward	After King Edward VII (reigned 1901–1910)		(舊)關仔角 (Kū-)kuan-á-kak (also the Esplanade)	(Old) government corner. The old Resident Councillor's Office and Penang Secretariat was a U-shaped building facing King Edward Place, with wings along Beach St and Weld Quay and backing onto Downing St, until it was destroyed by Allied bombing during the Second World War. The only remaining wing of the building is now occupied by Penang Religious Affairs Department on Beach St.		
King Street	Lebuh King	After King George III (reigned 1760–1820).		N. of Bishop St		படகோட்டியே தெரு Paṭakōṭṭiyē teru	Meaning "boatmen's street", The street was occupied by sailors and ship workers from South India who work at nearby port
King Street	Lebuh King	After King George III (reigned 1760–1820).		九間厝後; Káu-keng-tshù-āu	Behind the nine houses	படகோட்டியே தெரு Paṭakōṭṭiyē teru	Meaning "boatmen's street", The street was occupied by sailors and ship workers from South India who work at nearby port
King Street	Lebuh King	After King George III (reigned 1760–1820).		Bishop St – China St		படகோட்டியே தெரு Paṭakōṭṭiyē teru	Meaning "boatmen's street", The street was occupied by sailors and ship workers from South India who work at nearby port
King Street	Lebuh King	After King George III (reigned 1760–1820).		廣東大伯公街; Kńg-tang-tuā-peeh-kong-ke 亞片公司街; À-phiàn-kong-si-ke	Cantonese Heavenly Emperor's street, after the Cantonese temple there Opium farm street, after the Opium & Spirit Farm Offices at the junction with China St	படகோட்டியே தெரு Paṭakōṭṭiyē teru	Meaning "boatmen's street", The street was occupied by sailors and ship workers from South India who work at nearby port
King Street	Lebuh King	After King George III (reigned 1760–1820).		China St – Market St		படகோட்டியே தெரு Paṭakōṭṭiyē teru	Meaning "boatmen's street", The street was occupied by sailors and ship workers from South India who work at nearby port
King Street	Lebuh King	After King George III (reigned 1760–1820).		舊和勝公司街; Kū-hô-seng-kong-si-ke	Old Ho Seng secret society street	படகோட்டியே தெரு Paṭakōṭṭiyē teru	Meaning "boatmen's street", The street was occupied by sailors and ship workers from South India who work at nearby port
King Street	Lebuh King	After King George III (reigned 1760–1820).		S. of Market St		படகோட்டியே தெரு Paṭakōṭṭiyē teru	Meaning "boatmen's street", The street was occupied by sailors and ship workers from South India who work at nearby port
King Street	Lebuh King	After King George III (reigned 1760–1820).		吉寧仔街; Kiat-lêng-á-ke (also Market St, formerly also Chulia St (E. of Pitt St))	Indian street	படகோட்டியே தெரு Paṭakōṭṭiyē teru	Meaning "boatmen's street", The street was occupied by sailors and ship workers from South India who work at nearby port
Kuala Kangsar Road	Jalan Kuala Kangsar	After the town of Kuala Kangsar		番仔戲園街; Huan-á-hì-huînn-ke	Malay theatre street	கோலாகங்சார் சாலை Kōlākaṅcār Calai	After the town of Kuala Kangsar
Kulim Lane	Lorong Kulim	After the town of Kulim		萬安臺; Bān-an-tâi 明戲台; Bêng-hì-tâi	Ban An theatre (Ong) Beng (Tek)'s theatre		
Leith Street	Lebuh Leith	After Major-General Sir George Leith, Lieutenant-Governor of Penang (1800–1803). Leith St Ghaut was known as Martina's Lane, after Martina Rozells, mistress of Francis Light, but no longer appears on maps.	Nyior Cabang, after the palm trees that used to line it.	相好厝前; Siang-hó-tshù-tsêng	In front of Siang Ho's house		
Leith Street Ghaut	Gat Lebuh Leith	After Major-General Sir George Leith, Lieutenant-Governor of Penang (1800–1803). Leith St Ghaut was known as Martina's Lane, after Martina Rozells, mistress of Francis Light, but no longer appears on maps.					
Light Street	Lebuh Light	After Captain Francis Light, Founder of Penang and first Superintendent of the colony (1786–1794)		玻理口; Po-lê-kháu	Entrance to the Police Court, now the Legislative Assembly buildings	லைட் வீதி Laiṭ Vīti	After Captain Francis Light, Founder of Penang and first Superintendent of the colony (1786–1794)
Lines Road	Jalan S. P. Chelliah	After army lines (barracks) that used to be there.				செல்லையா வீதி Cellaiyā Vīti	
Logan Road	Jalan Logan	After James Richardson Logan, lawyer and editor of the Pinang Gazette, to whom the Logan Memorial in the grounds of the Supreme Court Building on Light St is dedicated.					
Lorong Salamat	Lorong Selamat			平安街; Phêng-an-ke	Peace street		
Love Lane	Lorong Cinta			色蘭乳巷; Sek-lân-ní-hāng (also Muntri St) 愛情巷; Ài-tshêng-hāng	Eurasian (Serani) lane, after the Portuguese Eurasian inhabitants Love lane		
Macalister Road	Jalan Macalister	After Colonel Norman Macalister, Governor of Penang (1807–1810)	Jalan Bharu	中路; Tiong-lōo	Middle road, being the middle road of the six roads that met at Magazine Circus.		
Macalister Lane	Lorong Macalister	After Colonel Norman Macalister, Governor of Penang (1807–1810)		姓王公司後; Sènn-ông-kong-si-āu	Behind the Ong clanhouse		
Macallum Street	Lebuh Macallum	After Colonel Sir Henry McCallum, Colonial Engineer of the Straits Settlements (1884–1889)		(過港仔第)五條路 (Kuè-káng-á tē) Gōo-tiâu-lōo	5th road (past the Prangin Ditch)		
Madras Lane	Lorong Madras	After the Indian city of Madras		油絞路; Iû-ka-lōo 柴落頭; Tshâ-lōo-thâu	Oil mill road Timber landing-place	மதராஸ் வழி Matarās Vali	After the Indian city of Madras
Magazine Circus		After the government gunpowder depot that used to be there.	Simpang Enam, "Six-road Junction"	五葩燈; Gōo-pha-teng 銃藥間; Tshèng-io̍h-keng 六叉路; La̍k-tshē-lōo	Five-armed lamp Gunpowder store Six-road junction, self-descriptive until the demolition of Gladstone Rd and the construction of KOMTAR.		
Magazine Road	Jalan Magazine	After the government gunpowder depot that used to be there.		(過港仔)頭條路 (Kuè-káng-á) Thâu-tiâu-lōo	1st road (past the Prangin Ditch)		
Malay Street	Lebuh Melayu	After the Malay inhabitants	After the Malay inhabitants	刣牛後; Thâi-gû-āu 刣牛巷; Thâi-gû-hāng	Behind the cattle slaughterhouse Cattle slaughterhouse lane	மலாய் வீதி Malāy Vīti	
Malay Street Ghaut	Gat Lebuh Melayu	After the Malay inhabitants		刣牛巷路頭; Thâi-gû-hāng lōo-thâu	Malay St landing place		
Market Lane	Lorong Pasar	After the Indian market that used to be at Market St Ghaut.		廣福居巷; Kóng-hok-kū-hāng	Penang Mutual Improvement Association lane	மார்க்கெட் தெரு Mārkkeṭ Teru	After the Market St Ghaut which dominated by Indian Traders
Market Street	Lebuh Pasar	After the Indian market that used to be at Market St Ghaut.		吉寧仔街; Kiat-lêng-á-ke (also King St (S. of Market St), formerly also Chulia St (E. of Pitt St)) 巴虱街; Pá-sat-ke	Indian street Market (pasar) street	கடை தெரு Kaṭai Teru	street of shops
Market Street Ghaut	Gat Lebuh Pasar	After the Indian market that used to be at Market St Ghaut.		新萬山; Sin-bān-san	New market (bangsal)		
Maxwell Road	Jalan Maxwell	After Sir William Edward Maxwell, Acting Resident Councillor of Penang (1886–1889)		W. of Gladstone Rd			
Maxwell Road	Jalan Maxwell	After Sir William Edward Maxwell, Acting Resident Councillor of Penang (1886–1889)		開恒美米絞; Khai-hêng-bí bí-ka	Khie Heng Bee ricemill		
Maxwell Road	Jalan Maxwell	After Sir William Edward Maxwell, Acting Resident Councillor of Penang (1886–1889)		E. of Gladstone Rd			
Maxwell Road	Jalan Maxwell	After Sir William Edward Maxwell, Acting Resident Councillor of Penang (1886–1889)		柴埕; Tshâ-tiânn 港仔墘; Káng-á-kînn (also Prangin Rd (W. of Sungei Ujong Rd))	Firewood yard, where firewood was principally sold By the Prangin Ditch		
McNair Street	Lebuh McNair	After Major John Frederick Adolphus McNair, Acting Lieutenant-Governor of Penang (1880–1884)					
Moulmein Close	Solok Moulmein	After the Burmese city of Moulmein (now Mawlamyaing)					
Muda Lane	Lorong Muda	After the Sungai Muda (river)		癞哥巷; Thái-ko-hāng	Lepers' lane, after the lepers who used to live here on the charity of a certain wealthy Chinaman		
Muntri Street	Lebuh Muntri	Possibly after the Mantri (minister) of Larut, Ngah Ibrahim bin Long Ja'afar		南華醫院街; Lâm-hua-i īnn-ke 新海南公司街; Sin-hái-lâm-kong-si-ke 色蘭乳巷; Sek-lân-ní-hāng (also Love Lane)	Lam Wah Ee Hospital street, after the hospital that used to be here New Hainanese association street Eurasian (Serani) lane, after the inhabitants.		
Nagore Road	Jalan Nagore	After the Indian city of Nagore				நாகூர் வீதி Nākūr Vīti	After the Indian city of Nagore
Nanking Street	Lebuh Nanking	After the Chinese city of Nanking.		(過港仔第)七條路 (Kuè-káng-á tē) Tshit-tiâu-lōo	7th road (past the Prangin Ditch)		
New Lane	Lorong Baru						
Noordin Street	Lebuh Noordin	After H. M. Noordin, Indian Muslim Merchant & one of the founders of the Kapitan Kling Mosque.		(過港仔第)二條路 (Kuè-káng-á tē) Jī-tiâu-lōo	2nd road (past the Prangin Ditch)		
Noordin Street Ghaut	Gat Lebuh Noordin	After H. M. Noordin, Indian Muslim Merchant & one of the founders of the Kapitan Kling Mosque.		土橋尾; Thōo-kiô-bué 紅燈角; Âng-teng-kak	End of the earthen-bridge Red lamp corner, after the red lamp used to guide boats at sea		
Northam Road	Jalan Sultan Ahmad Shah	New Malay name after the 7th Yang di-Pertuan Agong, Sultan Ahmad Shah of Pahang, who visited Penang in 1982.		紅毛路; Âng-môo-lōo	European road		
Northam Road	Jalan Sultan Ahmad Shah	New Malay name after the 7th Yang di-Pertuan Agong, Sultan Ahmad Shah of Pahang, who visited Penang in 1982.		E. of Transfer Rd			
Northam Road	Jalan Sultan Ahmad Shah	New Malay name after the 7th Yang di-Pertuan Agong, Sultan Ahmad Shah of Pahang, who visited Penang in 1982.		紅毛舊塚; Âng-môo-kū-thióng	Old European cemetery, after the old Protestant and Roman Catholic Cemetery there.		
Pangkor Road	Jalan Pangkor	After the Pangkor Treaty of 1874					
Peel Avenue	Lebuhraya Peel	After Sir William Peel, Resident Councillor of Penang (1925-6), later Governor of Hong Kong					
Penang Road	Jalan Penang	After Penang		About Chulia St		ஏழு முச்சந்தி Ēḻu Muccanti ராஜாதி மேடு Rājāti Mēṭu	Known as Junction of 7 roads because of intersection of 7 roads at the Magazine Road Junction. Meanwhile, Rājāti Mēṭu (ராஜாதி மேடு) means 'Queen's Mount', which refer to the celebration arch at Odean Junction.
Penang Road	Jalan Penang	After Penang		吊人街; Tiàu-lâng-ke	Gallows street, where criminals used to be hanged	ஏழு முச்சந்தி Ēḻu Muccanti ராஜாதி மேடு Rājāti Mēṭu	Known as Junction of 7 roads because of intersection of 7 roads at the Magazine Road Junction. Meanwhile, Rājāti Mēṭu (ராஜாதி மேடு) means 'Queen's Mount', which refer to the celebration arch at Odean Junction.
Penang Road	Jalan Penang	After Penang		About Chowrasta Market		ஏழு முச்சந்தி Ēḻu Muccanti ராஜாதி மேடு Rājāti Mēṭu	Known as Junction of 7 roads because of intersection of 7 roads at the Magazine Road Junction. Meanwhile, Rājāti Mēṭu (ராஜாதி மேடு) means 'Queen's Mount', which refer to the celebration arch at Odean Junction.
Penang Road	Jalan Penang	After Penang		舊跤樞; Kū-kha-khu 寧爵厝前; Lêng-tsiak-tshù-tsêng	Old prison In front of Lêng Tsiak's house	ஏழு முச்சந்தி Ēḻu Muccanti ராஜாதி மேடு Rājāti Mēṭu	Known as Junction of 7 roads because of intersection of 7 roads at the Magazine Road Junction. Meanwhile, Rājāti Mēṭu (ராஜாதி மேடு) means 'Queen's Mount', which refer to the celebration arch at Odean Junction.
Penang Road	Jalan Penang	After Penang		About Prangin Ditch		ஏழு முச்சந்தி Ēḻu Muccanti ராஜாதி மேடு Rājāti Mēṭu	Known as Junction of 7 roads because of intersection of 7 roads at the Magazine Road Junction. Meanwhile, Rājāti Mēṭu (ராஜாதி மேடு) means 'Queen's Mount', which refer to the celebration arch at Odean Junction.
Penang Road	Jalan Penang	After Penang		吊橋頭; Tiàu-kiô-thâu	Drawbridge head, after the bridge that used to span the Prangin Ditch (see e.g. the Mesjid Titi Papan) there	ஏழு முச்சந்தி Ēḻu Muccanti ராஜாதி மேடு Rājāti Mēṭu	Known as Junction of 7 roads because of intersection of 7 roads at the Magazine Road Junction. Meanwhile, Rājāti Mēṭu (ராஜாதி மேடு) means 'Queen's Mount', which refer to the celebration arch at Odean Junction.
Penang Road	Jalan Penang	After Penang		About the Magazine		ஏழு முச்சந்தி Ēḻu Muccanti ராஜாதி மேடு Rājāti Mēṭu	Known as Junction of 7 roads because of intersection of 7 roads at the Magazine Road Junction. Meanwhile, Rājāti Mēṭu (ராஜாதி மேடு) means 'Queen's Mount', which refer to the celebration arch at Odean Junction.
Penang Road	Jalan Penang	After Penang		人車丁牌館; Lâng-tshia-tèng-pâi-kuan	Rickshaw signboard office, after the rickshaw registration office	ஏழு முச்சந்தி Ēḻu Muccanti ராஜாதி மேடு Rājāti Mēṭu	Known as Junction of 7 roads because of intersection of 7 roads at the Magazine Road Junction. Meanwhile, Rājāti Mēṭu (ராஜாதி மேடு) means 'Queen's Mount', which refer to the celebration arch at Odean Junction.
Penang Street	Lebuh Penang	After Penang		N. of Bishop St		கட்டங்கி தெரு Kaṭṭaṅki Teru	Meaning "street of the Chettiar office". As this is the street where the Tamil moneylenders have their office which known as Kattangi (கட்டங்கி; Kaṭṭaṅki).
Penang Street	Lebuh Penang	After Penang		廣東街; Kńg-tang-ke 九間厝; Káu-keng-tshù	Cantonese street Nine houses	கட்டங்கி தெரு Kaṭṭaṅki Teru	Meaning "street of the Chettiar office". As this is the street where the Tamil moneylenders have their office which known as Kattangi (கட்டங்கி; Kaṭṭaṅki).
Penang Street	Lebuh Penang	After Penang		Bishop St - Market St		கட்டங்கி தெரு Kaṭṭaṅki Teru	Meaning "street of the Chettiar office". As this is the street where the Tamil moneylenders have their office which known as Kattangi (கட்டங்கி; Kaṭṭaṅki).
Penang Street	Lebuh Penang	After Penang		馬交街; Má-káu-ke	Macau / Cantonese street	கட்டங்கி தெரு Kaṭṭaṅki Teru	Meaning "street of the Chettiar office". As this is the street where the Tamil moneylenders have their office which known as Kattangi (கட்டங்கி; Kaṭṭaṅki).
Penang Street	Lebuh Penang	After Penang		S. of Market St		கட்டங்கி தெரு Kaṭṭaṅki Teru	Meaning "street of the Chettiar office". As this is the street where the Tamil moneylenders have their office which known as Kattangi (கட்டங்கி; Kaṭṭaṅki).
Penang Street	Lebuh Penang	After Penang		齊知街; Tse-ti-ke	Chettiar street, after the Chettiar money-lenders who operated there	கட்டங்கி தெரு Kaṭṭaṅki Teru	Meaning "street of the Chettiar office". As this is the street where the Tamil moneylenders have their office which known as Kattangi (கட்டங்கி; Kaṭṭaṅki).
Peirce Road	Jalan Peirce	After the Municipal Engineer of Penang in the 1890s					
Perak Road	Jalan Perak	After the sultanate of Perak		大路後; Tuā-lōo-āu	Behind Macalister Road	பேராக் சாலை Pērāk Cālai	After the state of Perak
Phee Choon Lane	Lorong Phee Choon			丕竣路; Phi-tsùn-lōo	Phee Choon road		
Pigott Road	Jalan Pigott	After F J Pigott, Colonial Engineer and Surveyor-General of the Straits Settlements (1905–21)					
Pinhorn Road	Jalan Pinhorn	After R H Pinhorn, headmaster of the Penang Free School (1905–21)					
Pitt Lane	Lorong Pitt	After William Pitt the Younger, who was British prime minister when Penang was founded (1783–1801, and again in 1804–1806). The new Malay name of Pitt St is after the Kapitan Kling mosque there, despite the fact that the street is also home to St George's Church, the Goddess of Mercy Temple (Taoist) and the Mahamariamman Temple (Hindu), all dating back to the earliest years of George Town and indicative of its religious diversity.		潮州公司後; Tiô-tsiu-kong-si-āu	Teochew association street		
Pitt Street	Jalan Masjid Kapitan Keling	After William Pitt the Younger, who was British prime minister when Penang was founded (1783–1801, and again in 1804–1806). The new Malay name of Pitt St is after the Kapitan Kling mosque there, despite the fact that the street is also home to St George's Church, the Goddess of Mercy Temple (Taoist) and the Mahamariamman Temple (Hindu), all dating back to the earliest years of George Town and indicative of its religious diversity.	The junction with Chulia St is known as Simpang Lelong ("Auction Junction") after the public auctions that were carried out here.	N. of China St		ஏலம் முச்சந்த்தி Ēlam Muccantti	Means "Auctioneer's Junction".
Pitt Street	Jalan Masjid Kapitan Keling	After William Pitt the Younger, who was British prime minister when Penang was founded (1783–1801, and again in 1804–1806). The new Malay name of Pitt St is after the Kapitan Kling mosque there, despite the fact that the street is also home to St George's Church, the Goddess of Mercy Temple (Taoist) and the Mahamariamman Temple (Hindu), all dating back to the earliest years of George Town and indicative of its religious diversity.	The junction with Chulia St is known as Simpang Lelong ("Auction Junction") after the public auctions that were carried out here.	觀音亭前; Kuan-im-têng-tsêng (also Kolam têng-tsêng)	In front of the Goddess of Mercy temple	ஏலம் முச்சந்த்தி Ēlam Muccantti	Means "Auctioneer's Junction".
Pitt Street	Jalan Masjid Kapitan Keling	After William Pitt the Younger, who was British prime minister when Penang was founded (1783–1801, and again in 1804–1806). The new Malay name of Pitt St is after the Kapitan Kling mosque there, despite the fact that the street is also home to St George's Church, the Goddess of Mercy Temple (Taoist) and the Mahamariamman Temple (Hindu), all dating back to the earliest years of George Town and indicative of its religious diversity.	The junction with Chulia St is known as Simpang Lelong ("Auction Junction") after the public auctions that were carried out here.	China St - Chulia St		ஏலம் முச்சந்த்தி Ēlam Muccantti	Means "Auctioneer's Junction".
Pitt Street	Jalan Masjid Kapitan Keling	After William Pitt the Younger, who was British prime minister when Penang was founded (1783–1801, and again in 1804–1806). The new Malay name of Pitt St is after the Kapitan Kling mosque there, despite the fact that the street is also home to St George's Church, the Goddess of Mercy Temple (Taoist) and the Mahamariamman Temple (Hindu), all dating back to the earliest years of George Town and indicative of its religious diversity.	The junction with Chulia St is known as Simpang Lelong ("Auction Junction") after the public auctions that were carried out here.	大峇唻; Tuā-ba-laí	Big police station (balai), after the Pitt St Police Station	ஏலம் முச்சந்த்தி Ēlam Muccantti	Means "Auctioneer's Junction".
Pitt Street	Jalan Masjid Kapitan Keling	After William Pitt the Younger, who was British prime minister when Penang was founded (1783–1801, and again in 1804–1806). The new Malay name of Pitt St is after the Kapitan Kling mosque there, despite the fact that the street is also home to St George's Church, the Goddess of Mercy Temple (Taoist) and the Mahamariamman Temple (Hindu), all dating back to the earliest years of George Town and indicative of its religious diversity.	The junction with Chulia St is known as Simpang Lelong ("Auction Junction") after the public auctions that were carried out here.	S. of Chulia St		ஏலம் முச்சந்த்தி Ēlam Muccantti	Means "Auctioneer's Junction".
Pitt Street	Jalan Masjid Kapitan Keling	After William Pitt the Younger, who was British prime minister when Penang was founded (1783–1801, and again in 1804–1806). The new Malay name of Pitt St is after the Kapitan Kling mosque there, despite the fact that the street is also home to St George's Church, the Goddess of Mercy Temple (Taoist) and the Mahamariamman Temple (Hindu), all dating back to the earliest years of George Town and indicative of its religious diversity.	The junction with Chulia St is known as Simpang Lelong ("Auction Junction") after the public auctions that were carried out here.	椰跤; Iâ-kha 大水井; Tuā-tsuí-tsénn (also Chulia St Ghaut)	Beneath the coconut trees Great well	ஏலம் முச்சந்த்தி Ēlam Muccantti	Means "Auctioneer's Junction".
Prangin Lane	Lorong Prangin	After the Prangin River (now Ditch) along Prangin Rd		鹹魚埕; Kiâm-hû-tiânn	Salted fish yard		
Prangin Road	Jalan Dr Lim Chwee Leong	After the Prangin River (now Ditch) along Prangin Rd		W. of Sungei Ujong Rd			
Prangin Road	Jalan Dr Lim Chwee Leong	After the Prangin River (now Ditch) along Prangin Rd		牛車街; Gû-tshia-ke 港仔墘; Káng-á-kînn (also Maxwell Rd)	Bullock-cart street By the Prangin Ditch		
Prangin Road	Jalan Dr Lim Chwee Leong	After the Prangin River (now Ditch) along Prangin Rd		Sungei Ujong Rd - Carnarvon St			
Prangin Road	Jalan Dr Lim Chwee Leong	After the Prangin River (now Ditch) along Prangin Rd		開恒美街; Khai-hêng-bí-ke	Khie Heng Bee (shop) street		
Prangin Road	Jalan Dr Lim Chwee Leong	After the Prangin River (now Ditch) along Prangin Rd		E. of Carnarvon St			
Prangin Road	Jalan Dr Lim Chwee Leong	After the Prangin River (now Ditch) along Prangin Rd		惠州公司街; Huī-tsiu-kong-si-ke 彎頭仔; Uân-thâu-á	Huichew association street Little turning		
Presgrave Street	Lebuh Presgrave	After Edward Presgrave, who founded the law firm of Presgrave & Matthews on Beach St in 1898.		(過港仔第) 三條路 (Kuè-káng-á tē) Sann-tiâu-lōo	3rd street (past the Prangin Ditch)		
Pykett Avenue	Lebuhraya Pykett	After the Rev. G. F. Pykett, headmaster of the Anglo-Chinese School, Penang (1892–1932)					
Queen Street	Lebuh Queen	After Queen Charlotte (consort to King George III 1761-1818)	Gedung Rumput "Hay barn"	十二間; Tsa̍p-jī-keng 舊和合社街; Kū-hô-ha̍p-siā-ke	Twelve houses, after twelve houses of the same height there Old Ho Hup society street		
Race Course Road	Jalan Lumba Kuda	After the Penang Turf Club racecourse there		大菜園路; Tuā-tshài-huînn-lōo	Big vegetable farm road		
Rangoon Road	Jalan Rangoon	After the Burmese capital, Rangoon.					
Residency Road	Jalan Residensi	After the Residency, the official residence of the British Resident Councillor and now of the Governor of Penang, to which it leads.		二王厝路; Jī-ông-tshù-lōo	Second king's house road. The Governor of the Straits Settlements in Singapore was the "first king"; the Resident Councillor of Penang the "second king".		
Rope Walk	Jalan Pintal Tali	After the ropewalk there, where rope was made from coconut fibres.		拍索巷; Phah-soh-hāng (also Kimberley St) 義福街; Gī-hok-ke	Ropemakers' lane Ghee Hock society street		
Rope Walk	Jalan Pintal Tali	After the ropewalk there, where rope was made from coconut fibres.		S. of Kimberley St			
Rope Walk	Jalan Pintal Tali	After the ropewalk there, where rope was made from coconut fibres.		煙筒路; Ian-tâng-lōo	Kerosene-lamp tube road		
Ross Road	Jalan Ross	After Frederick John Caunter Ross, who founded the Penang law firm of Logan & Ross in 1874					
Sandilands Street	Lebuh Sandilands	After G. M. Sandilands, a British trader who co-founded Lorraine, Sandilands & Co. in Penang in 1859		(過港仔第) 九條路 (Kuè-káng-á tē) Káu-tiâu-lōo	9th road (past the Prangin Ditch)		
Scotland Road	Jalan Scotland	Whimsically so called because of the estates there of Captain James Scott, business partner of Captain Francis Light, the founder of Penang.		峇抵眼東; Ba-tu-gan-tong	Batu Gantong, after the overhanging rock there.		
Scott Road	Jalan D. S. Ramanathan	After James Scott, a companion of Francis Light and founder of Jamestown (now Bayan Lepas). New Malay name after Cllr D. S. Ramanathan, the first Mayor of the City of George Town (1957).					
Seh Tan Court	Halaman Seh Tan	After the Tan clan association there		姓陳公司; Sènn-tân-kong-si	Tan clanhouse		
Seck Chuan Lane	Lorong Sek Chuan			大門樓内; Tuā-muî-lâu laī	Within the great archway, the lane being one of two entrances to a big compound house there over which there was a large archway.		
Sepoy Lines Road	Jalan Sepoy Lines	After the Indian sepoy barracks that used to be there					
Soo Hong Lane	Lorong Soo Hong	After Khoo Soo Hong, a founding senator on the Khoo Kongsi board in 1851					
Sri Bahari Road	Jalan Sri Bahari	After the Sri Kunj Bihari Temple established on Penang Rd by Bihari members of the Bengali Regiment of the East India Company, whose endowment included houses on this road. Also known as Bengali Street.				ஸ்ரீ பிகாரி வீதி Sri Bahari Vīti	After the Sri Kunj Bihari Temple established on Penang Rd by Bihari members of the Bengali Regiment of the East India Company, whose endowment included houses on this road
Stewart Lane	Lorong Stewart	After the Eurasian Stewart family who lived there		觀音亭後; Kuan-im-têng-āu 三板巷; Sam-pán-hāng	Behind the Goddess of Mercy temple Boat lane		
Sungei Ujong Road	Jalan Sungai Ujong	After the district of Sungai Ujong in Negeri Sembilan		胡椒埕; Hôo-tsio-tiânn 萬得豐路; Bān-tek-hong-lōo	Pepper yard Ban Tek Hong (pepper yard) road		
Tamil Street	Lebuh Tamil	After the Tamil inhabitants	After the Tamil inhabitants	吉寧仔萬山; Kiat-lêng-á bān-san (also Chowrasta Rd)		தமிழ் வீதி Tamiḻ Vīti	Indian market
Tek Soon Street	Lebuh Tek Soon	After Cheah Tek Soon, a prominent 19th century Chinese businessman and opium farmer.		柴埕後; Tshâ-tiânn-āu 德順路; Tek-sūn lōo	Behind Maxwell Rd (E. of Gladstone Rd); Tek Soon road		
Tengku Kudin Road	Jalan Tengku Kudin	After Tunku Dhiauddin ibni Almarhum Sultan Zainul Rashid (Tunku Kudin), crown prince of Kedah and Viceroy of Selangor at the time of the Treaty of Pangkor (1874), who settled in Penang after being exiled from Kedah (see also Udini Rd)					
To Aka Lane	Lorong Toh Aka			鑑光內橫路; Kàm-kong-laī-huâinn-lōo 拍鐵街巷仔; Phah-thih-ke hāng-á	Carnarvon Street cross street Little lane off Beach St (Acheen St - Malay St)		
Transfer Road	Jalan Transfer	After the transfer of the Straits Settlements from the Government of British India to the administration of the Colonial Office in 1867.		德順厝邊街; Tek-sūn-tshù-pinn-ke	Street by Tek Soon's house		
Tye Sin Street	Lebuh Tye Sin	After Foo Tye Sin, a commissioner into the causes of the 1867 Penang Riots.		(過港仔第) 四條路 (Kuè-káng-á tē) Sì-tiâu-lōo	4th road (past the Prangin Ditch)		
Udini Road	Jalan Udini	After Tunku Dhiauddin ibni Almarhum Sultan Zainul Rashid (Tunku Kudin), crown prince of Kedah and Viceroy of Selangor at the time of the Treaty of Pangkor (1874), who settled in Penang after being exiled from Kedah (see also Tengku Kudin Rd)					
Union Street	Lebuh Union	Possibly after the Union of Great Britain and Ireland (1801–1922)		玻理後; Po-lê-āu	Behind the Police Courts (now the Legislative Assembly buildings)		
Vermont Road	Jalan Vermont	After J F B Vermont, a leader of the European community in Penang in the 1880s and 1890s.					
Victoria Green Road	Jalan Padang Victoria	After Victoria Green, the grounds of Chinese Recreation Club which boast a statue of Queen Victoria, there.					
Victoria Street	Lebuh Victoria	After Queen Victoria (reigned 1836–1901), Queen and Empress of India.		海墘新路; Hái-kinn-sin-lōo (also Weld Quay)	New road by the waterfront		
Waterfall Road	Jalan Air Terjun	After the waterfall in the neighbouring Penang Botanic Gardens		亞逸倒潤; A-e̍k-tò-lūn	Ayer Terjun, waterfall.		
Weld Quay	Pengkalan Weld	After Sir Frederick Weld, Governor of the Straits Settlements (1880–1887)		新海墘街; Sin-hái-kinn-ke 海墘新路; Hái-kinn-sin-lōo (also Victoria St)	New-waterfront street New road by the waterfront	கிடங்கு தெரு Kiṭaṅku Teru	Meaning warehouse street
Western Road	Jalan Utama	English name self-describing. The Residency of the Governor is here, and the new Malay name means "principal road", after the style of the Governor, Tuan Yang Terutama, literally "most principal lord/master", which is used in place of the English style "His Excellency".		紅毛新塚; Âng-môo-sin-thióng 平安巷; Pêng-an-hāng 西華巷; Sai-hua-hāng	New European cemetery Peace lane Western grand lane		
York Road	Jalan York	After the English city of York. Whimsically so called because it leads to Scotland Rd.					

== Districts in George Town ==
Name	Etymology	Hokkien name	Hokkien etymology	Tamil name	Tamil etymology
Bakar Bata	After the brick kiln that used to be there	罇仔窰; Tsuínn-á-iô			Brick kiln
Dato Kramat	Possibly after a Datuk Keramat shrine there.	四崁店; Sì-khám-tiàm	Four shops, the name of Dato Keramat Rd (W. of Patani Rd)	ட்டோ கேரமாத் Ṭṭō Kēramāt	Possibly after a Datuk Keramat shrine there.
Dhoby Ghaut	After the laundrymen (Hindustani: dhobi) who used to work there. The original Dhobi Ghat is in Bombay.	洗布橋; Sé-pòo-kiô	Washermen's bridge	வண்ணன் தோரா தேடல் Vaṇṇaṉ Tōrā Tēṭal	literally means a laundry district.
Jalan Bharu	New road	中路; Tiong-lōo	Middle road, the name of Macalister Rd		
Kampong Bharu	New village	大樹跤; Tuā-tshiū-kha	Under the big trees		
Kebun Limau	Lime/lemon plantation	柑仔園; Kam-á-huînn	Mandarin orange plantation, the name of Dato Keramat Rd (E. of Patani Rd).		
Pulau Tikus	Rat island, the name of the small islet off the coast.	浮羅池滑; Phû-lôo-ti-kut	(phonetic)		
Rifle Range	After the rifle range that used to be there	拍銃埔; Phah-tshèng-pōo	Rifle range		
Sepoy Lines	After the sepoy barracks that used to be there	時排埔; Si-pâi-pōo	Sepoy field		
Tarek Ayer	Drawing water, after the aqueduct that ran along Burmah Rd	牛車水; Gû-tshia-tsuí	Bullock-cart water		
Titi Papan	Plank bridge, after the bridge over the Prangin Ditch.	吊橋頭; Tiàu-kiô-thâu	Suspension-bridge head, the name of Penang Rd (about the Prangin Ditch).		
Ujong Pasir	End of the sand	社尾; Siā-bué	End of the village, the name of Beach St (S. of Malay St)		

== Suburban roads ==
English name	Official Malay name	Etymology	Hokkien name	Hokkien etymology
Fettes Road	Jalan Fettes	After J. D. Fettes, the engineer of the Guillemard reservoir built there in 1929.	水池路; Tsuí-tînn-lōo	Reservoir road.
Mount Erskine Road	Jalan Mount Erskine	Mount Erskine (350 ft) was owned by John James Erskine, Judge and Member of the Council, so-called "Second King of Penang", who came to the island in 1805.	白雲山; Pe̍eh-hûn-suann	White cloud mountain
Vale of Tempe Road	Jalan Lembah Permai	After the Greek Vale of Tempe; the Malay name is a semi-calque which means "Peaceful Valley".		
Summit Road	Jalan Sultan Yahya Petra	Self-descriptive: the road at the summit of Penang Hill.		
Karpal Singh Drive	Persiaran Karpal Singh	Formerly known as IJM Promenade. It was renamed after Penang born lawyer and also Jelutong Member of Parliament, Karpal Singh.		
Chin Fung Kee Drive	Persiaran Chin Fung Kee	Formerly known as Persiaran Pantai Sinaran. It was renamed after Malaysian geotechnical engineering pioneer and former University of Malaya acting Vice-Chancellor Tan Sri Chin Fung Kee.		

== See also ==
- List of roads in Kuala Lumpur
- List of roads in Ipoh
