= Chulia Street, George Town =

Road in the Malaysian state of Penang

Chulia Street
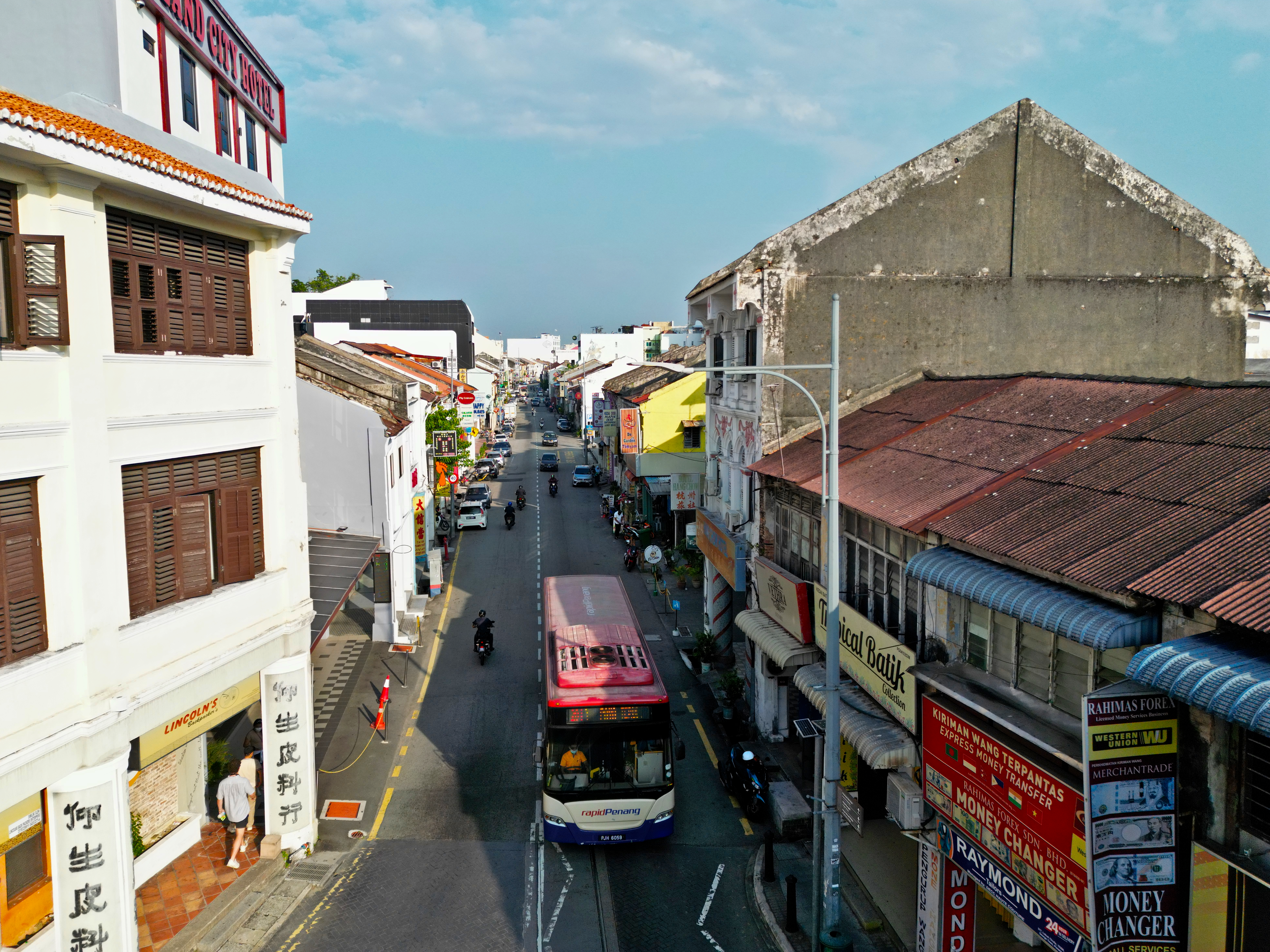
- Interactive map of Chulia Street
- Native name: Malay: Lebuh Chulia; Simplified Chinese: 牛干东; traditional Chinese: 牛干東; Hokkien POJ: Thôo-khòo-ke; Tamil: கலிங்க வீதி
- Maintained by: Penang Island City Council
- Location: George Town
- Coordinates: 5.417072°N 100.337878°E
- West end: Penang Road
- East end: Beach Street

Construction
- Inauguration: 1798
- LEBUH CHULIA Chulia St10200 P. PINANG

UNESCO World Heritage Site
- Type: Cultural
- Criteria: ii, iii, iv
- Designated: 2008 (32nd session)
- Part of: George Town UNESCO Core and Buffer Zones
- Reference no.: 1223
- Region: Asia-Pacific

Chulia Street is one of the oldest roads in the city of George Town within the Malaysian state of Penang. Created after the founding of George Town in 1786, it forms part of the city's Little India enclave, whilst also boasting a multicultural character due to Indian Muslim and Chinese influences.

In addition, Chulia Street has a large concentration of budget accommodation for tourists, as several shophouses along the road have been converted into hostels and guesthouses. Chulia Street is also well-known as a food paradise within Penang, due to the numerous hawker stalls and restaurants along the street that serve local cuisine.

== Etymology ==
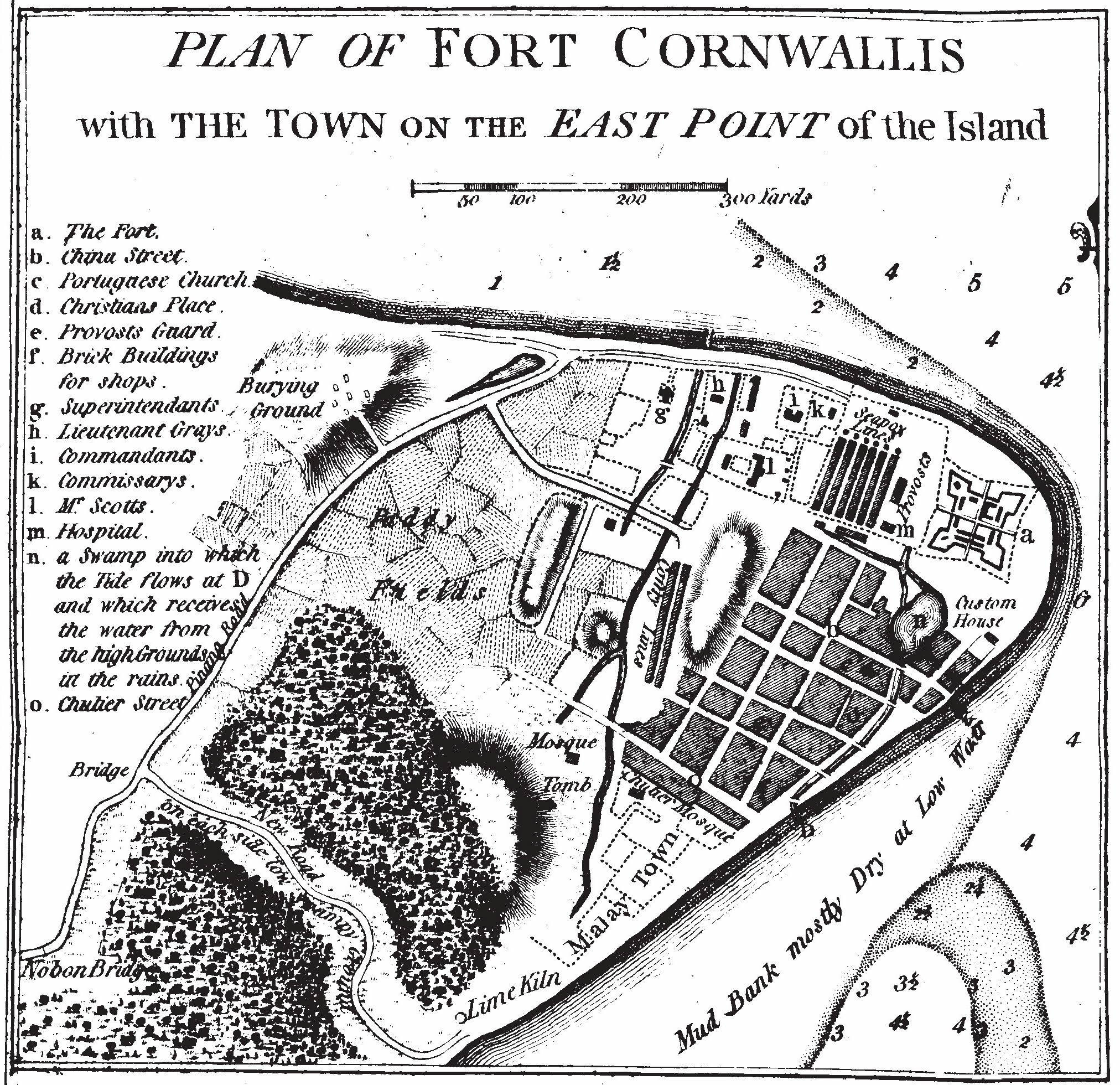
Chulia Street originally formed the southern limits of George Town, as can be seen in this 1799 map of the settlement.

Originally, the street was named Malabar Street, after the Indians from Malabar who moved to George Town.

The term 'Chulia' is a corruption of 'Chulier', which was once used to refer to the Indians who originated from the coastal areas of Tamil Nadu in India. That particular region was formerly part of the Chola Kingdom, hence the term 'Chulier'.

== History ==
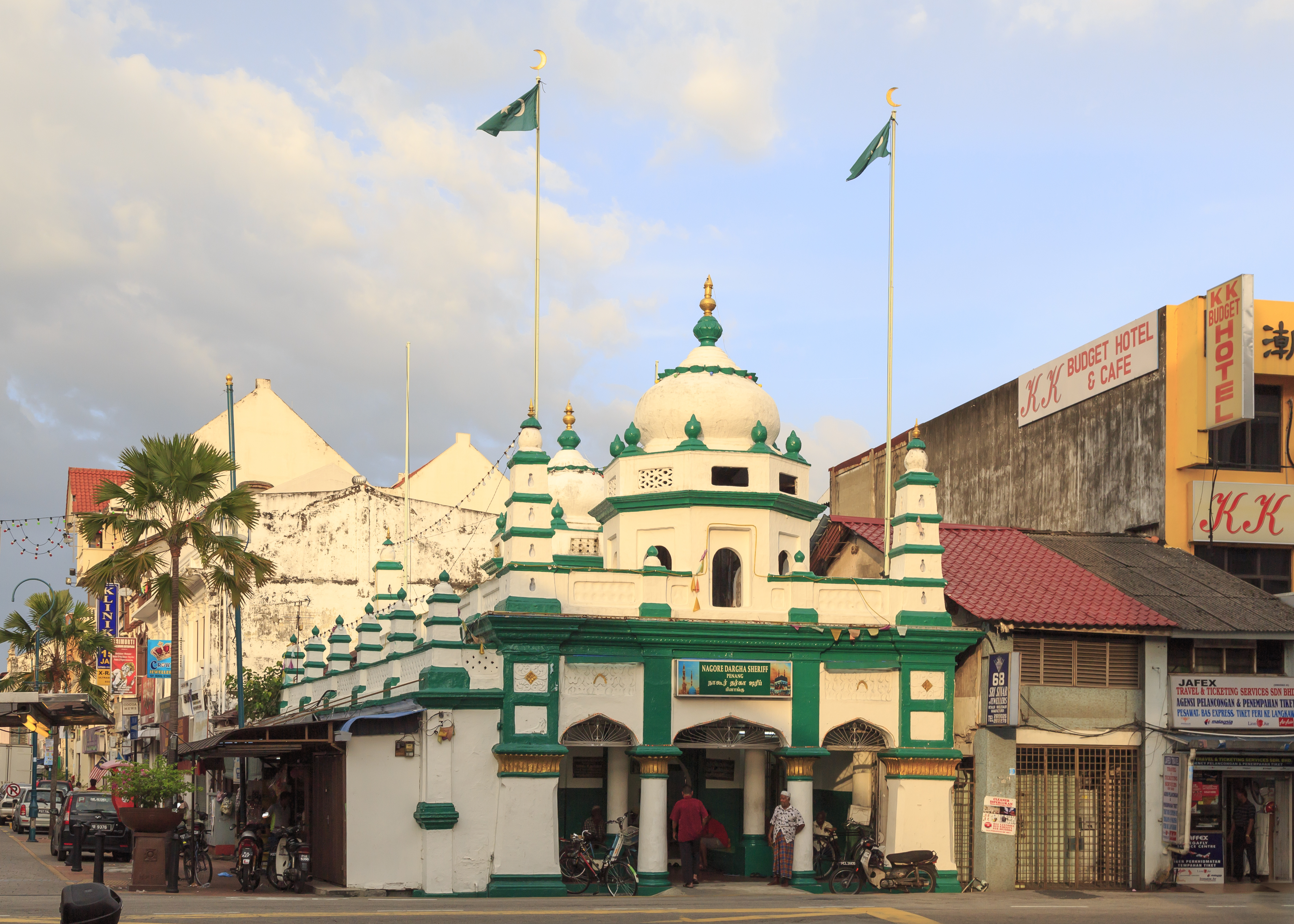
The Nagore Durgha Shrine at Chulia Street, built in 1803, is one of the oldest Muslim buildings in George Town.

Malabar Street was laid out soon after the founding of Penang in 1786 by Captain Francis Light. The road marked the original southern limits of the new settlement of George Town.

The street was renamed Chulia Street in 1798, as the British recognised that most of the Indians who moved to the street were, in fact, from Tamil Nadu. The early inhabitants were Muslims, and they subsequently built a number of religious buildings along Chulia Street, such as the Nagore Durgha Shrine and the Noordin Family Tomb.

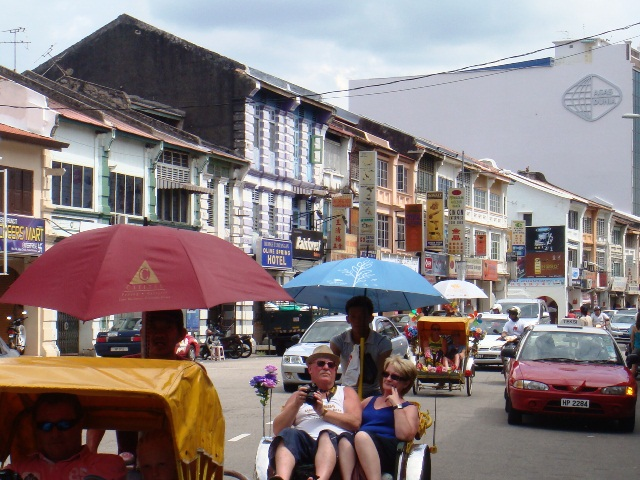
Tourists travelling on trishaws along Chulia Street

Due to the influx of ethnic Indians along Chulia Street, the road has become part of George Town's Little India enclave. However, while the population of Indian Muslims along Chulia Street began to decline in the late 19th century, ethnic Chinese were simultaneously moving into the road, thus contributing to Chulia Street's multicultural character.

Since the early 20th century, Chulia Street has gained its reputation as the destination for budget tourists. Budget hostels and guesthouses, along with businesses such as laundries, restaurants, bars and travel agencies, now operate out of the rows of shophouses lining the road. In recent years, upmarket hotels have also been established along Chulia Street.

== See also ==
- List of roads in George Town
