= Malaysians of Indian descent in Penang =

Ethnic community

Malaysians of Indian descent in Penang பினாங்கு இந்தியர்கள் Kaum India di Pulau Pinang Chulias
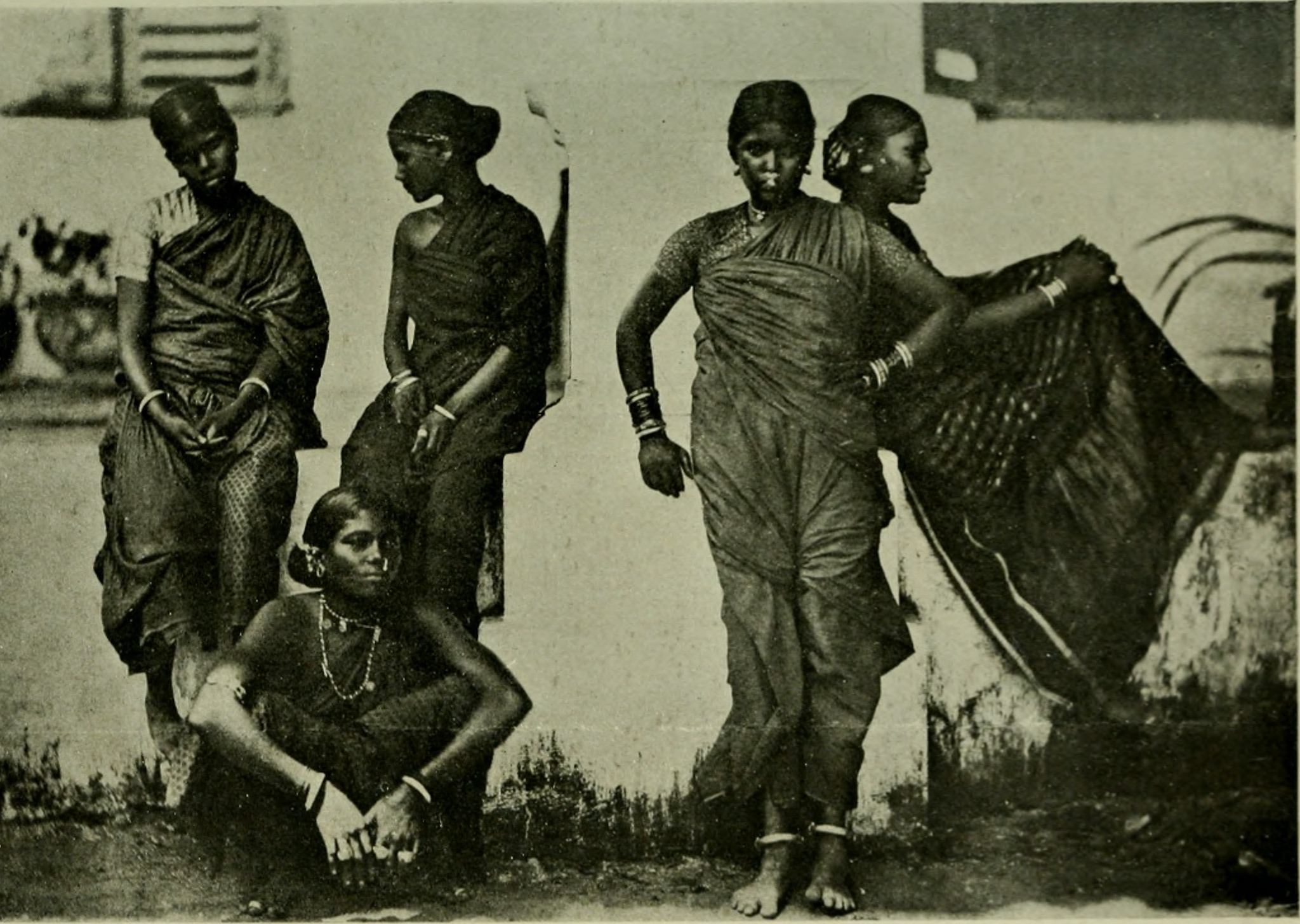
- A group of Tamil women in Province Wellesley (known as Seberang Perai today), Penang, 1907.

Total population
- 155,492; 8.9% Penang's population in 2020 (census)

Regions with significant populations
- Penang
- George Town: Batu Ferringhi, Gelugor, Balik Pulau, Ayer Itam
- {{{region2}}}: Seberang Perai: Kepala Batas, Nibong Tebal, Perai, Simpang Ampat

Languages
- Tamil (Malaysian Tamil) majority/dominant, Penang Hokkien (secondary lingua franca or interlanguage with the Penangite Chinese community), Penang Malay and English (Tanglish and Manglish); Other Indian languages: Gujarati, Telugu, Punjabi, Malayalam

Religion
- Hinduism (predominantly), Christianity, Sikhism, Islam, Buddhism, Baháʼí Faith, Jainism

Related ethnic groups
- Other Malaysian Indians, Chitty, Chindian, Malaysian Gujaratis, Malaysian Tamils, Malaysian Malayalis, Telugu Malaysians

Penangite Indians (Tamil: பினாங்கு இந்தியர்கள்; Malay: Kaum India di Pulau Pinang), also known as Chulias, are Malaysian Indians that live primarily in the state of Penang, Malaysia. Most are the descendants from those who migrated from India during the British colonisation of Malaya. However, historical sources prove that the ancient Indians arrived in Penang during the Chola dynasty. Penangite Indians forms a large percentage of the state's professional community such as business, law and medicine as well as politics, it can be proven by the appointment of Dr. P. Ramasamy as deputy chief minister of Penang. It made him the first Malaysian of Indian origin to hold the post of deputy chief minister in any state of Malaysia. In addition, first Tamil Vernacular School in Malaysia was established in Penang.

== History ==
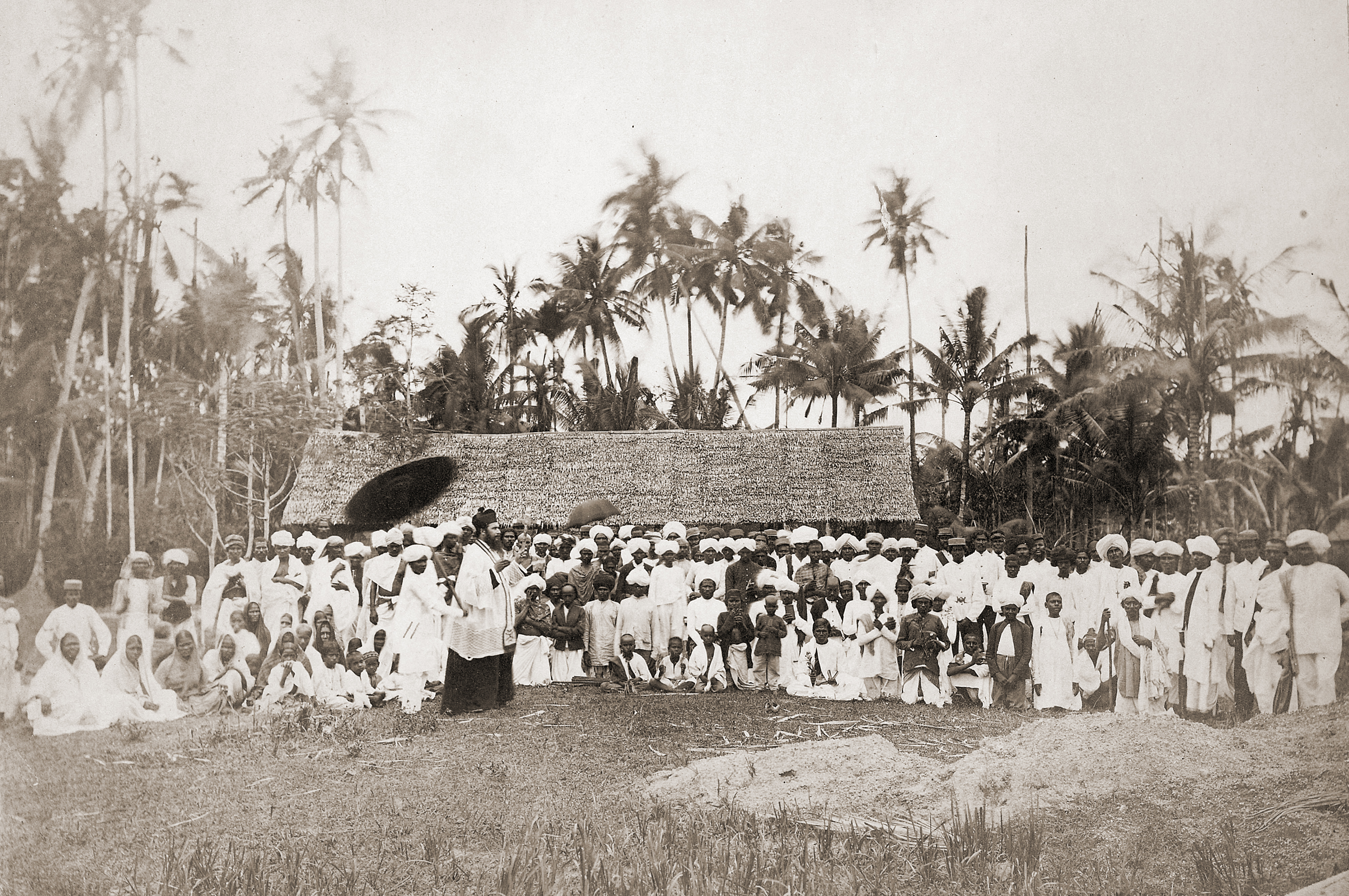
A photo of Rev. Habb preaching to the Indians in Penang, taken by Kristen Feilberg and exhibited in the 1867 Paris Exhibition.

Already in the 1790s, Francis Light mentions Chulias (that is, people from the Coromandel Coast of India) as shopkeepers and farm labourers in Penang. Light estimated that about two thousand men came to work in this manner each year. however, in contrast to the Chinese, these labourers did not create a permanent settlement in Penang. They would, rather, work long enough to save money and then return to their families in south India. This group of migrants comprised the ‘Adi Dravidas,’ a group of impoverished labourers originating in the hinterlands of the Tamil country and Andhra Desa who, facing insufficient work in their homeland, went abroad for survival.

The Malabars, also known as Malabaris, who were predominantly Muslims were brought in to Penang as convict labourers. They were known to build the roads and government buildings in Penang. The migration of the Malabaris to Penang led to the existence of places such as Kampung Kaka and Kampung Malabar in Penang.

Another class of Indian migrants was a class of people hailing from the Kaveri delta areas (from the Sivaganga district of Madras) known as ‘Nattukottai Chettiars’ who were by occupation money-lenders. Their presence in Penang and elsewhere where plantations sprang up aided merchants, miners, and planters, as these Chettiars were advancing required working capital in the absence of any effective banks. Light also encouraged migration by the Chettiar community as part of his plan to create a cash economy on Penang.

Unlike the Tamil migrants, Telugu migrants from the northern Coromandel Coast came to Penang as families. For this reason, many did not leave when their work terms expired, but rather continued working on plantations or as merchants. Over 1,500,000 south Indians who worked in Malayan plantations, more than three-fourths returned to India, nearly all of them Tamil. Later migrants include Gujaratis (mostly Jains with Muslims and Parsees, with pockets of Hindus), Punjabis (mostly Sikh with significant Hindu minorities), Malayalees, Bengalis, Sindhis as well as Marwaris and Ceylonese Tamils.

As a result of the occupation of Malaysia, the Japanese killed about 150,000+ Indian Tamils of Malaysia and Burma in Burma within a period of time after arriving for slave labour work of constructing the Myanmar rail.

Beginning with Light, Penang boasted a tradition of religious and ethnic tolerance. All races could practice their respective religious faith and social stability in a multi-racial society was thus achieved.

== Language ==
The main language spoken by Indians in Penang is Malaysian Tamil dialect of Tamil language in addition to the country's official and national language Malaysian (English is also widely spoken and understood). Besides Tamil, Telugu, Gujarati as well as Malayalam and Punjabi are also spoken by small ethnic Telugu, Gujarati, Malayalam and Punjabi communities of Indians. Ethnic Jawi Peranakan, a Muslim creole ethnic group of mixed Indian, Malay and Arab ancestry with predominantly Indian origin mostly use Malay as their first language in addition to English. Another distinct group of Indian Muslims known as Mamak use the Penang Malay (Pelat Utara) variant as their first and daily language. Historically, Penang Hokkien was referred to as a lingua franca of Penang before the rise in the use of Mandarin and English. Penang Hokkien is still used by some members of the Penangite Indian community, particularly street vendors especially when communicating to their fellow Penangite Chinese compatriots as a bazaar lingua franca.

== Enclave ==
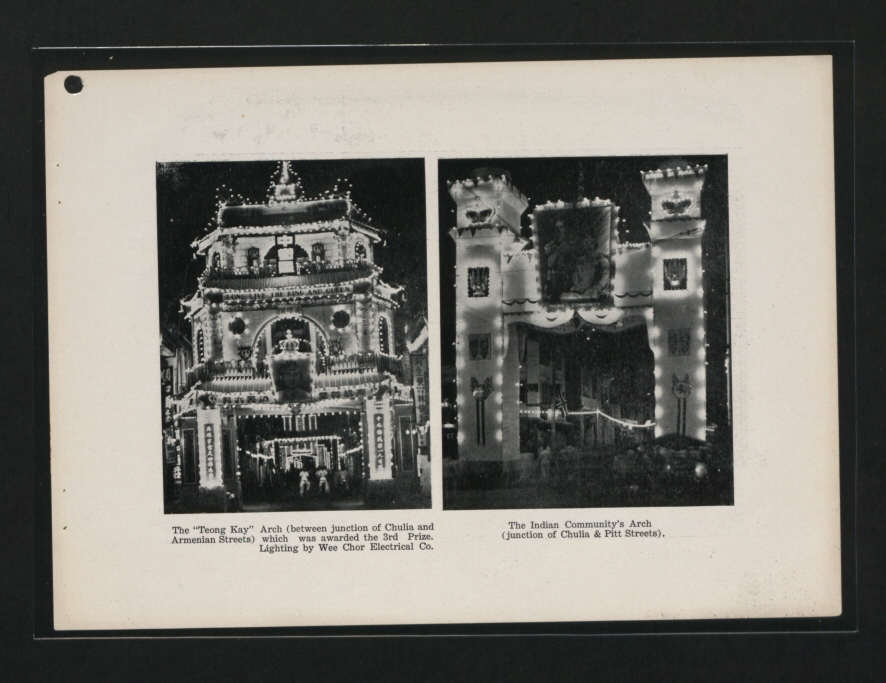
The Indian Community's Arch at the junction of Chulia & Pitt Streets during the night (right), Penang, 1937.

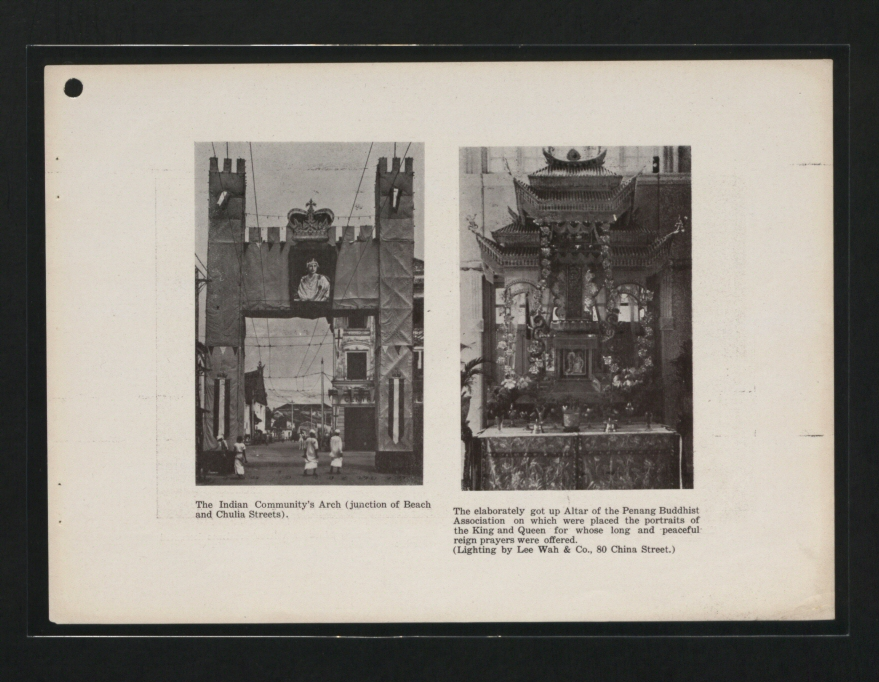
The Indian Community's Arch at junction of Beach and Chulia Streets during the day (left), Penang, 1937.

Little India in the city of George Town is a well-known Indian enclave in Malaysia. It Covers an area around Lebuh Queen, Lebuh Chulia and Market Street. Its location at the centre of Penang Heritage Zone and nearby Penang's main finance centre, Beach Street makes it one of the most famous and notable shopping spot in Penang among local and international tourists.

== Culture ==
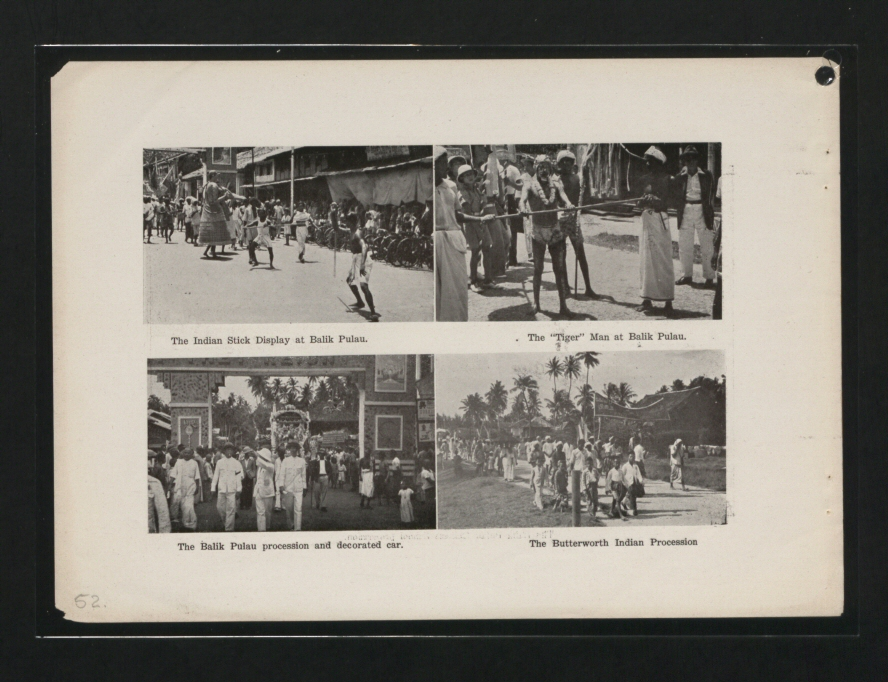
A display of Silambam, the Indian stick fighting (top left), a demonstration by "Tiger" Man (top right) and Indian procession (bottom left and right) in Balik Pulau, Penang, 1937.

The Indian community in Penang has made significant cultural contributions, especially in the areas of cuisine, festivals, and religious practices. Penang is known for its diverse food culture, and Indian dishes, particularly those of Tamil and Malayalee origin, are widely enjoyed. Festivals like Deepavali, Thaipusam, and Pongal are celebrated with enthusiasm, contributing to the multicultural tapestry of Penang.

=== Cuisine ===
Indian cuisine in Penang is a phenomenon in Malaysian cuisine.Dishes like Nasi Kandar and Roti Canai are not only the most popular dishes in Penang, but throughout Malaysia.Penang, Malaysia, is renowned for its diverse and flavorful culinary scene, and the Indian food in Penang is no exception. Influenced by the rich heritage of the Indian community, particularly from Tamil Nadu (mainly Chettinad cuisine) and other regions of the Indian subcontinent, Penang's Indian cuisine offers a delightful array of dishes. Here are some key elements of Penang's Indian food:

- Roti Canai- A popular Malaysian-Indian dish, Roti Canai, has become a staple in Penang. This flatbread is typically served with various curries, such as chicken curry, fish curry, or dhal. The roti is skillfully flipped and stretched, creating a thin, flaky texture that pairs well with the flavorful curries.
- Nasi Kandar: Nasi Kandar is a signature Penang dish that originated from the Indian-Muslim community. It consists of steamed rice accompanied by an assortment of curries, meats, and vegetables. The dish is often served with sides like fried chicken, fish, or beef, and it allows diners to customize their meal with a variety of flavorful curries.
- Banana Leaf Rice: This South Indian-inspired dish is a popular choice in Penang. Traditionally served on a banana leaf, it includes steamed rice, an assortment of vegetable dishes, pickles, and various curries. Diners often enjoy the tactile experience of eating with their hands, and the combination of flavors is a true delight.
- Satti Sorru - Satti Sorru also known as Indian claypot rice
- Thosai (Dosa) and Idli:Thosai, or dosa, is a fermented crepe made from rice and urad dal, typically served with coconut chutney and sambar (a lentil-based vegetable stew). Idli, steamed rice cakes, is another South Indian favorite. Both dishes are commonly found in Penang's Indian eateries.
- Murtabak:Murtabak is a stuffed flatbread that is often filled with a mixture of minced meat, onions, and spices. It's a flavorful and hearty dish that has become a beloved part of Penang's Indian food scene. Murtabak is commonly served with a side of curry sauce.
- Biryani: Indian biryani, a fragrant and flavorful rice dish cooked with aromatic spices and meat (usually chicken or mutton), is a culinary gem in Penang. The biryani is often accompanied by raita (yogurt with herbs and spices) and a side salad.
- Indian Sweets:No Indian culinary experience is complete without sampling some traditional sweets. In Penang, Indian sweet shops offer a variety of treats, including gulab jamun, jalebi, and barfi. These sweets are often enjoyed during festivals and celebrations.
- Masala Tea: To complement the savory dishes, Indian tea, or masala chai, is a popular beverage choice in Penang. This spiced tea, brewed with aromatic spices such as cardamom and cinnamon, is a comforting and flavorful way to end a meal.

=== Festival ===
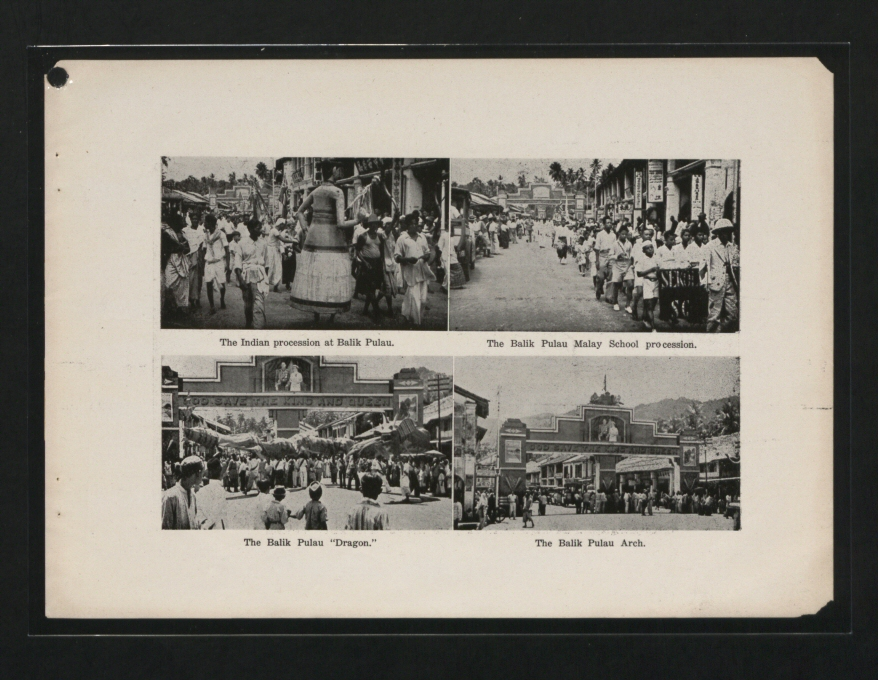
An Indian procession at Balik Pulau, Penang (top left), 1937.

One of the biggest festivals in Penang is a Hindu religious festival called Thaipusam. Thaipusam is dedicated to the lord Murugan. Deepavali, better known as the 'Festival of Lights', is another major Hindu festival celebrated by all Hindus. Tamils celebrate the harvest festival of Pongal, which is usually held 13 to 16 January. Similar celebrations, known as Makar Sankranti is celebrated by most other Indian communities and Punjabis called them as Lohri. While Indian Christians celebrate Christmas Day and Good Friday. Indian Muslims, Jawi Peranakans and Mamaks celebrates Eid Al Fitr and Eid Al Adha along with the country's other Muslim groups like their ethnic Malay counterparts.

==== Theppa Thiruvizha ====
Theppa Thiruvizha or floating chariot festival is considered as one of the most important festival in Penang after Thaipusam. The annual festival is hosted by Sri Singamuga Kaliamman Temple at Teluk Bahang.

A celebration to thank the goddess, Sri Singamuga Kaliamman, for her good grace and to beseech her to continue providing devotees with protection and prosperity, Theppa Thiruvizha only takes place during Masi Magam, the 11th month1 in the Tamil calendar. It is a day when temple idols are taken out for a ceremonial bath. Thousands travel from all over Malaysia to take part in the festivities.

The day begins with morning prayers; the devotees who attend bring milk as an offering to the goddess. In the afternoon, the floating chariot is carefully pushed into the sea by temple president Sadha Sivam, the youth club members and other temple members. Later, after evening prayers, the idol of the goddess is carried to the chariot

=== Literature ===
The first known Tamil magazine called Thangai Nesan was published in 1876. Two other magazines Ulaka Nesan and Hindu Nesan were published in 1887 and 1888 respectively. We also know that in 1887 a book entitled Sathiya Vedha Sarithira Saaram (The Essence of the Bible) by Palavendhiram Rayappan was published here. In 1890, Pathaanandha Maalai (A garland of Praise) was published by Mohamed Sultan Maraikkayar. (A list of early books provided.) Many of these books and magazines were produced by Indian immigrants and much of the literary output was in the form of poetry and some of the notable poets of recent times were Swami Ramadasar, Panaikkulam M. Abdul Majid and N.Karim. This tradition continues today with home-grown writers and poets. In the early fifties Tamil Murasu, a Singapore Tamil daily, began a student supplement called Maanavar Manimandra Malar (Supplement for Students Bell Club). This served as a training ground for budding writers in Tamil. The Thamilar Thirunaal (Tamils Festival, also sponsored by this daily, provided motivation and training for writers with its various literary competitions.

Following these examples, several- associations were formed in Penang to promote and nourish Tamil writing. Among them were the Tamil Youth Bell Club, Valluvar Debating Society, Bharathi Debating Society, the Senthamizh Kala Nilayam and North Malaya Tamil Writers Association.

Poetry can be said to be the most. prolific of the literary output. (A list of significant poets and poetry provided.) Following this is the significant production of short stories. The Penang-based writers’ list is long, but among them are Murugaiyan, Dato P. Shanmugam, A. Kadir, CT. Ramasamy, Anthony Muthu, S. Anbanantham, M. Sultan, etc. (List provided.)

Contribution from Penang to Malaysian Tamil literature includes writings of K. Sonaimuthu with several of his biographies and essays, and R. Karthigesu with his novels. While writers like Karthigesu and Seeni Naina Mohamed came into Penang from other states, Penang has also lost some of its illustrious writers like M. Asan Gani, M. Sultan and Karaikizhaar to other states.

=== Penangite Indian movies ===
- Appalam
- Vennira Iravuggal

== Education ==
The first Tamil vernacular schools in Malaya (now Malaysia) was set up in Penang under the Labour Code. In 2014, the Penang government brought a motion to open the first Tamil vernacular secondary school in Malaysia at Penang. But for political reasons this proposal was rejected by the central government.

Indian Malaysians also form the bulk of English teachers in Penang. Law and medicine has traditionally been a preferred career option by Indian families although younger Indians now venturing into other fields such as engineering, finance and entrepreneurship

=== List of Tamil schools in Penang and Perak ===
Extended content

♦ SJK (Tamil) Ladang Jawi

♦ SJK (Tamil) Ladang Alma

♦ SJK (Tamil) Ladang Juru

♦ SJK (Tamil) Ladang Malakoff

♦ SJK (Tamil) Ladang Mayfield

♦ SJK (Tamil) Ladang Prye

♦ SJK (Tamil) Ramakrishna

♦ SJK (Tamil) Sungai Ara

♦ SJK (Tamil) Ladang Valdor

♦ SJK (Tamil) Sungai Bakap

♦ SJK (Tamil) Azad

♦ SJK (Tamil) Bayan Lepas

♦ SJK (Tamil) Bukit Mertajam

♦ SJK (Tamil) Ladang Byram

♦ SJK (Tamil) Nibong Tebal

♦ SJK (Tamil) Ladang Changkat

♦ SJK (Tamil) Ladang Sempah

♦ SJK (Tamil) Ladang Krian

♦ SJK (Tamil) Ladang Transkrian

♦ SJK (Tamil) Permatang Tinggi

♦ SJK (Tamil) Palaniandy

♦ SJK (Tamil) Mak Mandin

♦ SJK (Tamil) Perai

♦ SJK (Tamil) Jalan Sungai

♦ SJK (Tamil) Tasik Permai

♦ SJK (Tamil) Ladang Batu Kawan

♦ SJK(Tamil) Perak Sangeetha Sabah, Ipoh

♦ SJK (Tamil) Kerajaan, Jalan Sungai Pari, Ipoh

♦ SJK (Tamil) Ladang Yam Seng, Semanggol

♦ SJK (Tamil) Ladang Changkat Salak, Salak Utara

♦ SJK (Tamil) Ladang Selaba, Teluk Intan

♦ SJK (Tamil) Ladang Jendarata 1, Teluk Intan

♦ SJK (Tamil) Ladang Jendarata 2

♦ SJK (Tamil) Ladang Jendarata 3

♦ SJK (Tamil) Ladang Getah Taiping

♦ SJK (Tamil) Pangkor

♦ SJK (Tamil) Taman Desa Pinji

♦ SJK (Tamil) Kampung Tun Sambanthan, Ayer Tawar

♦ SJK (Tamil) Ladang Ayer Tawar

♦ SJK (Tamil) Ladang Cluny

♦ SJK (Tamil) Ladang Banopdane

♦ SJK (Tamil) Kampung Baru Matang

♦ SJK (Tamil) Ladang Sogomana

♦ SJK (Tamil) Kampong Colombia, Ayer Tawar

♦ SJK (Tamil) Flemington

♦ SJK (Tamil) Bandar Behrang

♦ SJK (Tamil) Batak Rabit

♦ SJK (Tamil) Jebong Lama

♦ SJK (Tamil) Ladang Kota Bahroe

♦ SJK (Tamil) Methodist Malim Nawar

♦ SJK (Tamil) Ladang Gapis

♦ SJK (Tamil) Nova Scotia 2

♦ SJK (Tamil) Ayer Tawar

♦ SJK (Tamil) Tapah

♦ SJK (Tamil) Khir Johari

♦ SJK (Tamil) Tun Sambanthan

♦ SJK (Tamil) Bharathy

♦ SJK (Tamil) Sungkai

♦ SJK (Tamil) Slim River

♦ SJK (Tamil) Slim Village

♦ SJK (Tamil) Tan Sri Dato' Manickavasagam

♦ SJK (Tamil) Tong Wah

♦ SJK (Tamil) Ladang Bidor Tahan

♦ SJK (Tamil) Bikam

♦ SJK (Tamil) Sungai Kruit

♦ SJK (Tamil) Ladang Sunkai

♦ SJK (Tamil) Trolak

♦ SJK (Tamil) Kelapa Bali

♦ SJK (Tamil) Ladang Behrang River

♦ SJK (Tamil) Ladang Katoyang

♦ SJK (Tamil) Ladang Cashwood

♦ SJK (Tamil) Maha Ganesa Viddyasalai

♦ SJK (Tamil) Chettiars

♦ SJK (Tamil) Pengkalan Baru

♦ SJK (Tamil) Ladang Huntly

♦ SJK (Tamil) Ladang Walbrook

♦ SJK (Tamil) Ladang Sungai Wangi 2

♦ SJK (Tamil) Mukim Pundut

♦ SJK (Tamil) Kampung Kayan

♦ SJK (Tamil) Beruas

♦ SJK (Tamil) Tanjong Rambutan

♦ SJK (Tamil) St. Philomena Convent

♦ SJK (Tamil) Perak Sangeetha Sabah

♦ SJK (Tamil) Kampung Simee

♦ SJK (Tamil) Gunong Rapat

♦ SJK (Tamil) Menglembu

♦ SJK (Tamil) Cangkat

♦ SJK (Tamil) Tronoh

♦ SJK (Tamil) Gopeng

♦ SJK (Tamil) Methodist, Buntong Ipoh

♦ SJK (Tamil) Ladang Chemor

♦ SJK (Tamil) Ladang Changkat Kiding

♦ SJK (Tamil) Klebang

♦ SJK (Tamil) Ladang Strathisla

♦ SJK (Tamil) Ladang Kinta Vally

♦ SJK (Tamil) Mambang Diawan

♦ SJK (Tamil) Kampar

♦ SJK (Tamil) Ladang Kampar

♦ SJK (Tamil) Ladang Selinsing

♦ SJK (Tamil) Kuala Kurau

♦ SJK (Tamil) Simpang Lima

♦ SJK (Tamil) Bagan Serai

♦ SJK (Tamil) Saint Mary's

♦ SJK (Tamil) Ladang Sungai Bogak

♦ SJK (Tamil) Ladang Gula

♦ SJK (Tamil) Ladang Chersonese

♦ SJK (Tamil) Ladang Jin Seng

♦ SJK (Tamil) Ladang Soon Lee

♦ SJK (Tamil) Arumugam Pillai

♦ SJK (Tamil) Ladang Kelumpong

♦ SJK (Tamil) Ladang Gedong

♦ SJK (Tamil) Ladang Sungai Biong

♦ SJK (Tamil) Mahathma Gandi Kalasalai

♦ SJK (Tamil) Gandhi Memorial

♦ SJK (Tamil) Ladang Kati

♦ SJK (Tamil) Ladang Gapis

♦ SJK (Tamil) Ladang Perak River Valley

♦ SJK (Tamil) Enggor

♦ SJK (Tamil) Ladang Elphil

♦ SJK (Tamil) Ladang Sungai Reyla

♦ SJK (Tamil) Ladang Dovenby

♦ SJK (Tamil) Thiruvalluvar

♦ SJK (Tamil) Sithambaram Pillay

♦ SJK (Tamil) Ladang Sussex

♦ SJK (Tamil) Netesa Pillay

♦ SJK (Tamil) Ladang Sungai Timah

♦ SJK (Tamil) Ladang Sabrang

♦ SJK (Tamil) Ladang Nova Scotia 1

♦ SJK (Tamil) Ladang Rubana 1

♦ SJK (Tamil) Ladang Teluk Buloh

♦ SJK (Tamil) Ladang Jendarata Bahagian Alpha Bernam

♦ SJK (Tamil) Ladang Flemington

♦ SJK (Tamil) Ladang Teluk Bharu

♦ SJK (Tamil) Ladang Kuala Bernam

♦ SJK (Tamil) Bagan Datoh

♦ SJK (Tamil) Ladang Strathmashie

♦ SJK (Tamil) Ladang New Coconut

♦ SJK (Tamil) Ladang Ulu Bernam 2

♦ SJK (Tamil) ladang Sungai Samak

♦ SJK (Tamil) Ladang Kamatchy

♦ SJK (Tamil) Kamunting

♦ SJK (Tamil) YMHA

♦ SJK (Tamil) St Teresa's Convent

♦ SJK (Tamil) Ulu Sepetang

♦ SJK (Tamil) Selama

♦ SJK (Tamil) Pondok Tanjung

♦ SJK (Tamil) Ladang Holyrood

♦ SJK (Tamil) Ladang Malaya

♦ SJK (Tamil) Ladang Sin Wah

♦ SJK (Tamil) Ladang Lauderdale

♦ SJK (Tamil) Ladang Matang

♦ SJK (Tamil) Kampong Baru

♦ SJK (Tamil) Ladang Allagar

♦ SJK (Tamil) Ladang Temerloh

♦ SJK (Tamil) Ladang Stoughton

♦ SJK (Tamil) Pengkalan Hulu

♦ SJK (Tamil) Gerik

♦ SJK (Tamil) Ladang Kota Lima

♦ SJK (Tamil) Ladang Glenealy

♦ SJK (Tamil) Ladang Serapoh

♦ SJK (Tamil) Ladang Buloh Akar

== Notable Penangite Indians ==
- Abdul Malik Mydin (1975–), Malaysian solo long-distance swimmer. He was notable as the first Malaysian and Southeast Asian to swim across the English Channel on 3 August 2003.
- Bishan Singh Ram Singh (1944–2006), Malaysian social activist and environmentalist.
- Cecil Rajendra (1941–), Malaysian poet and lawyer
- David Arumugam, founding members of the band Alleycats.
- Deborah Priya Henry (1985–), Miss Malaysia 2007 (of Irish and Indian ancestry)
- Faezah Elai (1982–), Malaysian actress (of Punjabi, Thai and Malay ancestry)
- Gobind Singh Deo (1973–), prominent Malaysian lawyer and politician and the Member of Parliament for Puchong, Selangor.
- Jagdeep Singh Deo (1971–), lawyer and Democratic Action Party (Malaysia) assemblyman for Dato Keramat, Penang.
- Karpal Singh (1940–2014), Malaysian former lawyer and politician
- Kishva Ambigapathy (1990–), First Asian Chairperson, Commonwealth Youth Council & Royal Mace Bearer Queen Elizabeth II 90th Birthday
- Krishnamurthi Muniandy (1980–), Malaysian cricketer
- Loganathan Arumugam (1952–2007), founding members of the band Alleycats.
- M. Manogaran (1959–), Malaysian politician
- Nicol David (1983–), World no.1 squash player (of Indian and Chinese ancestry)
- G. Palanivel (1949–), Minister of Natural Resources and Environment and current president of Malaysian Indian Congress.
- Peter Pragas (1926–2014), Malaysian composer and musician
- D. S. Ramanathan, first mayor for the city of George Town and founder of Labour Party of Malaya
- Ramkarpal Singh, Malaysian lawyer and politician
- Syed Thajudeen (1943–), Malaysia well known painter
- Vanessa Raj, professional squash player who represents Malaysia
- Vanida Imran, actress and television host
- S. Veenod (1988–), Malaysian footballer.
- Vijay Eswaran (1960–), Malaysian businessman
- SK Sundaram (Malaysian businessman)
- Dr. Jegajeeva Rao Subba Rao, Consultant Obstetrician and Gynaecologist, First recipient of the inaugural Prime Minister of Australia Asia Endeavour Award in 2010.

== Bibliography ==
- Sandhu, Kernial Singh (1969), Indians in Malaya-immigration and settlement, Cambridge University Press, p. 29
- Sinnappah, Anasanatnam (1979), Indians in Malaysia and Singapore, Kuala Lumpur: Oxford University Press, p. 19
- Snider, Nancy (1968), "What Happened in Penang", Asian Survey, 12 (12): 960–975, doi:10.2307/2642150, JSTOR 2642150
