= Market Street, George Town =

Road in the Malaysian state of Penang

Market Street
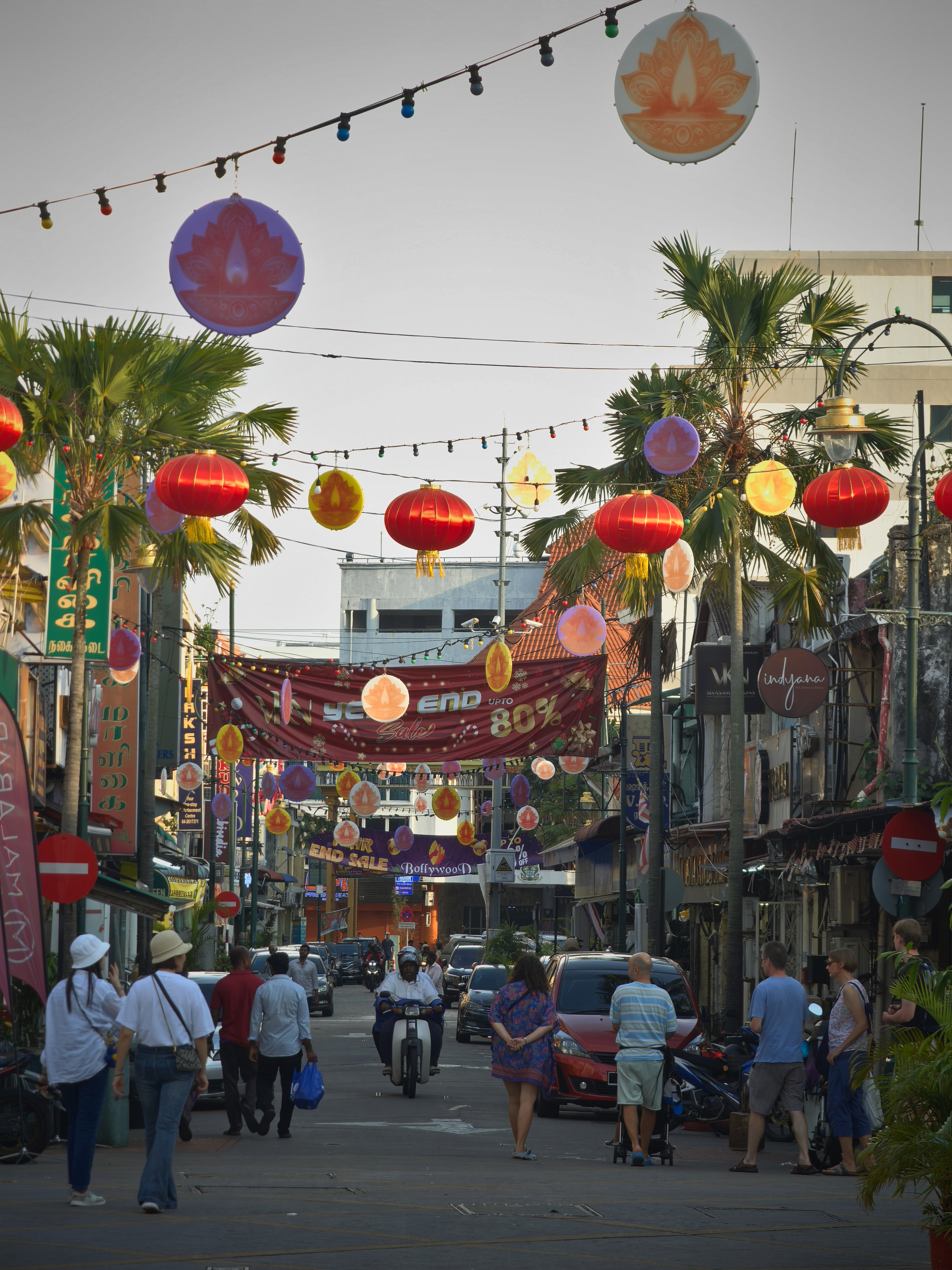
- Interactive map of Market Street
- Native name: Malay: Lebuh Pasar; Simplified Chinese: 卖菜街; traditional Chinese: 賣菜街; Tamil: கிடங்கு தெரு
- Maintained by: Penang Island City Council
- Location: George Town
- Coordinates: 5.417742°N 100.338556°E
- West end: Pitt Street
- East end: Beach Street
- LEBUH PASAR Market St10200 P. PINANG

UNESCO World Heritage Site
- Type: Cultural
- Criteria: ii, iii, iv
- Designated: 2008 (32nd session)
- Part of: George Town UNESCO Core Zone
- Reference no.: 1223
- Region: Asia-Pacific

Market Street is a street in the city of George Town within the Malaysian state of Penang. Located within the city's UNESCO World Heritage Site, this street was named after a market which was established by Indian emigrants to Penang. The street is known in Tamil as Kadai Teru, meaning "street of shops". The market continued to function even after the full reclamation that created Victoria Street.

The area has been settled by south Indians, whose presence is still conspicuous till today. This part of town is now regarded as part of the Little India enclave in George Town. The street bears many similarities to market streets in Chennai, Mumbai or Delhi. It is a notable shopping spot among locals and tourists. This street is also famous for Malaysian Indian cuisine.
