= Historic Cities of the Straits of Malacca =

Two UNESCO World Heritage sites in Malaysia

Melaka and George Town, Historic Cities of the Straits of Malacca
UNESCO World Heritage Site
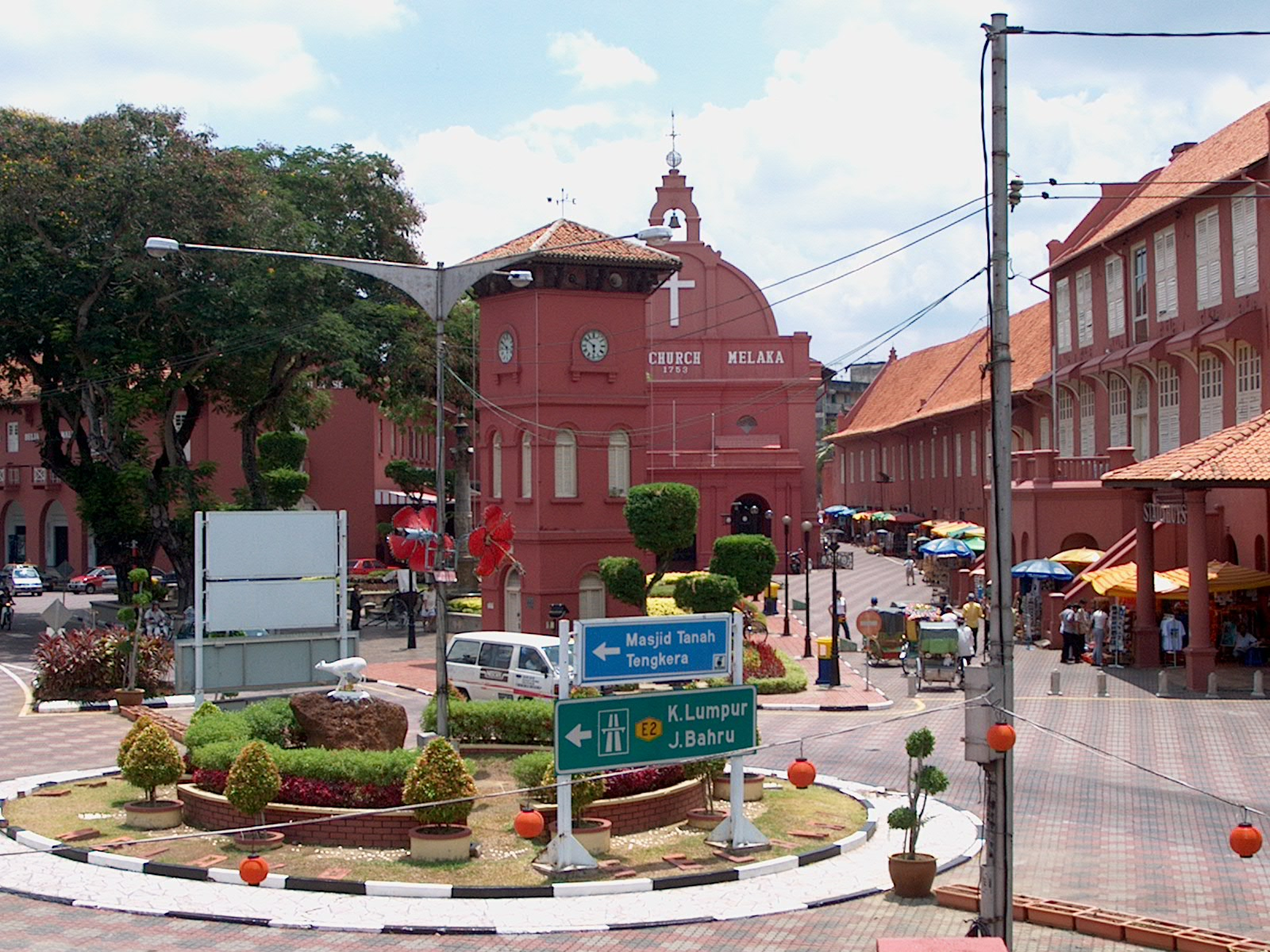
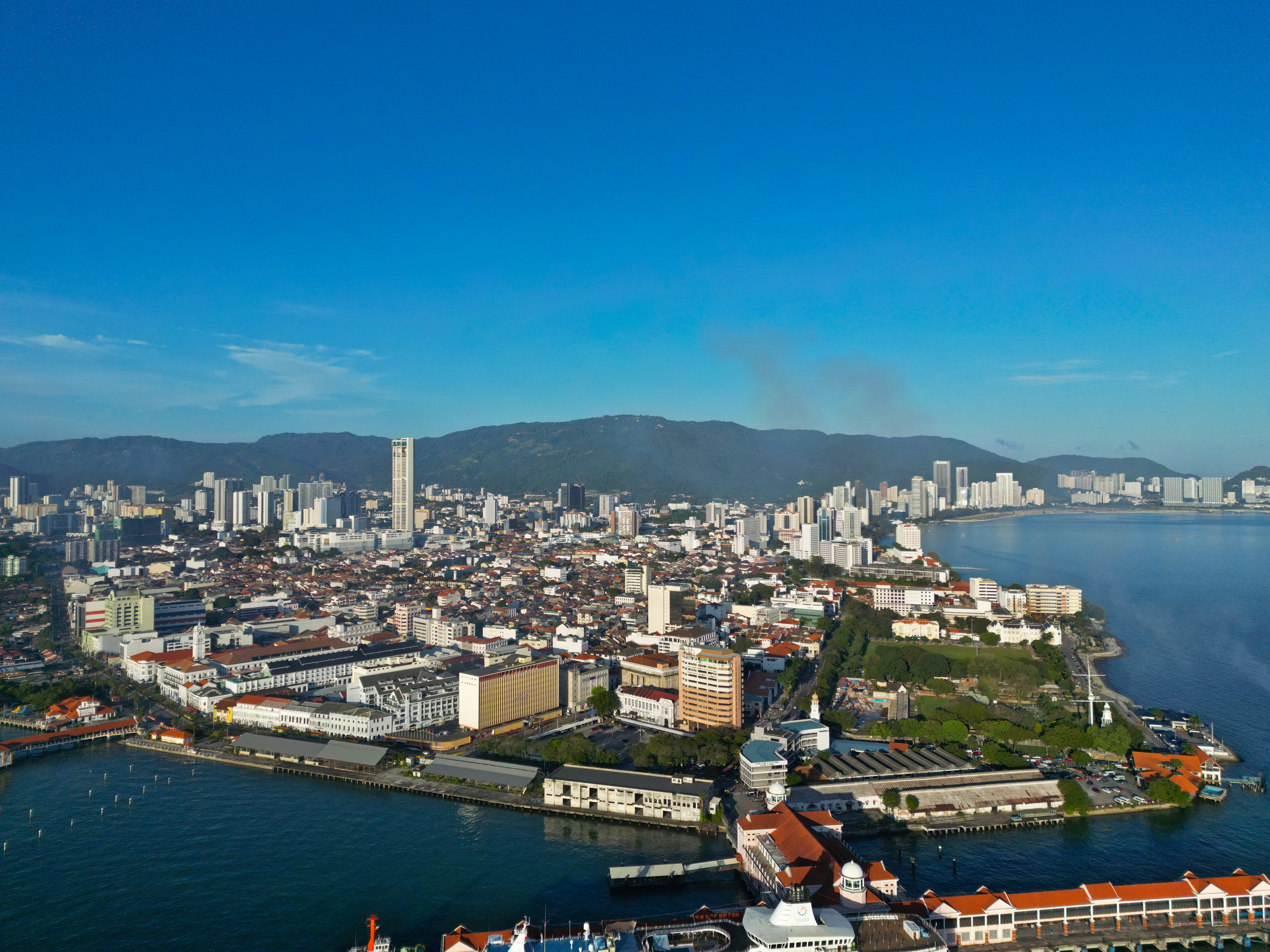
- Melaka (above); George Town (below)
- Location: Malaysia
- Includes: 1. Historic City of Melaka; 2. Historic City of George Town
- Criteria: Cultural: (ii)(iii)(iv)
- Reference: 1223bis
- Inscription: 2008 (32nd Session)
- Extensions: 2011
- Area: 218.76 ha (540.6 acres)
- Buffer zone: 392.84 ha (970.7 acres)

Melaka and George Town, Historic Cities of the Straits of Malacca is a UNESCO World Heritage listing comprising the historic urban centres of two cities, Melaka and George Town, that illustrate 500 years of cultural and trade exchange between East and West.

This World Heritage site illustrates the development of maritime urban settlements in the region over time and the contributions of diverse ethnic and cultural groups in developing these cities. The government buildings, churches, squares and fortifications of Melaka demonstrate the early stages of this history originating in the 15th-century Malay sultanate, which was followed by Portuguese and Dutch periods of control beginning in the early 16th century. George Town represents the British era from the end of the 18th century and features residential and commercial buildings of the period. In both cities, the cultural and architectural contributions of local Malays as well as Chinese and South Asian immigrants can be seen, and their own evolutions traced over times as well.

Melaka was inscribed in the listing using the Malay language spelling of the name, as opposed to the more traditional English language spelling of its name, "Malacca".

== Inscription criteria ==
The listing was inscribed on the basis of Criterion (ii), "exhibit an important interchange of human values", as the two cities are examples of multicultural trading forged from the exchange of Malay, Chinese and Indian cultures, and three successive European colonial powers over almost 500 years; Criterion (iii): "bearing unique testimony to a cultural tradition", as the cities’ multicultural heritage is expressed through the great variety of religious buildings of many faiths, ethnic quarters, languages, and festivals; and Criterion (iv): "an outstanding example of a type of building or landscape which illustrates a significant stage in human history", as Malacca and George Town reflect a mixture of influences which created a unique architecture, culture and townscape without parallel anywhere in East and Southeast Asia.

== Inscription history ==
The listing was originally added to Malaysia’s Tentative List for World Heritage in 2001. The site was inscribed on the list in 2008 by the World Heritage Committee at its 32nd session in Quebec City, Canada.

Singapore and Phuket, also located on the Strait of Malacca, share a history of multicultural colonial development very similar to that of Melaka and George Town and were assessed for possible inclusion in the listing. However, Singapore’s historic core underwent extensive demolition and redevelopment during the 1970s and 1980s, and remaining historic properties lack the integrity necessary for consideration. Phuket’s historical core is considerably smaller and lacks the rich built heritage found in Melaka and George Town.

A minor boundary adjustment was made to the Melaka buffer zone to incorporate the gazetted Chinese cemetery in the Bukit Cina area, as had been recommended in ICOMOS’ original report in 2008.

ICOMOS identified the main threats to the property to be tourism development pressure and traffic. In the longer term, climate change and rising sea levels may create flooding problems. ICOMOS recommended that these issues be addressed specifically in future management plans.

== World Heritage Sites ==
=== George Town ===
The UNESCO-designated site within downtown George Town comprises a 109.38 ha (270.3-acre) core zone surrounded by a 150.04 ha (370.8-acre) buffer zone. This portion of the city centre is the oldest section of the entire city and reflects the British colonial era from the late 18th century. It had been officially designated as a historic enclave in 1987. The Penang Island City Council has identified 3,642 heritage buildings within both zones.

Historical landmarks within the George Town UNESCO World Heritage Site.
Click link at the top right corner to zoom in.
1 Bank of China Building
2 Batik Painting Museum
3 Cenotaph
4 Cheong Fatt Tze Mansion
5 CIMB Building
6 City Hall
7 Church of the Assumption
8 Clan Jetties
9 Eastern & Oriental Hotel
10 Eng Chuan Tong Tan Kongsi
11 Esplanade
12 Foo Tye Sin Mansion
13 Fort Cornwallis
14 Fort Cornwallis Lighthouse
15 George Town Dispensary building
16 Goddess of Mercy Temple
17 High Court
18 HSBC Building
19 India House
20 Kapitan Keling Mosque
21 Khoo Kongsi
22 Lebuh Aceh Mosque
23 Little India
24 Logan Memorial
25 Nagore Durgha Sheriff
26 OCBC Building
27 Old Protestant Cemetery
28 Penang Chinese Chamber of Commerce
29 Penang Islamic Department Building
30 Penang Islamic Museum
31 Penang State Museum and Art Gallery
32 Pinang Peranakan Mansion
33 Queen Victoria Memorial Clock Tower
34 St. George's Church
35 St. Xavier's Institution
36 Sri Mahamariamman Temple
37 Sri Kunj Bihari Temple
38 Standard Chartered Bank Building
39 State Assembly Building
40 Sun Yat-sen Museum
41 Swettenham Pier
42 Town Hall
43 Wisma Kastam

=== Melaka ===
The UNESCO-designated site within Malacca City comprises a 38.62 ha (95.4-acre) core zone surrounded by a 134.03 ha (331.2-acre) buffer zone. Located along both sides of the Malacca River and centred around St. Paul's Hill, this area reflects the historical significance of the 15th century Malacca Sultanate, as well as subsequent Portuguese and Dutch colonial periods. St. Paul's Hill had been officially designated as a heritage zone in 1988.

Historical landmarks within the Melaka UNESCO World Heritage Site.
Click link at the top right corner to zoom in.
1 A Famosa
2 Bukit Cina
3 Cheng Ho Cultural Museum
4 Cheng Hoon Teng Temple
5 Dutch Graveyard
6 Governor's Museum
7 Governor's Museum
8 Hang Jebat Mausoleum
9 Hang Kasturi Mausoleum
10 Hang Li Poh's Well
11 Malacca Art Gallery
12 Malay and Islamic World Museum
13 Malaysia Architecture Museum
14 Melaka Light
15 Melaka Warrior Monument
16 Middelburg Bastion
17 Poh San Teng Temple
18 Stadthuys
19 Sungei Ujong War Memorial
20 Tamil Methodist Church
21 Christ Church
22 Church of St. Francis Xavier
23 Saint Paul's Church

== See also ==
- Straits Settlements
