= HSBC Building (Penang) =

Commercial offices in George Town, Penang, Malaysia

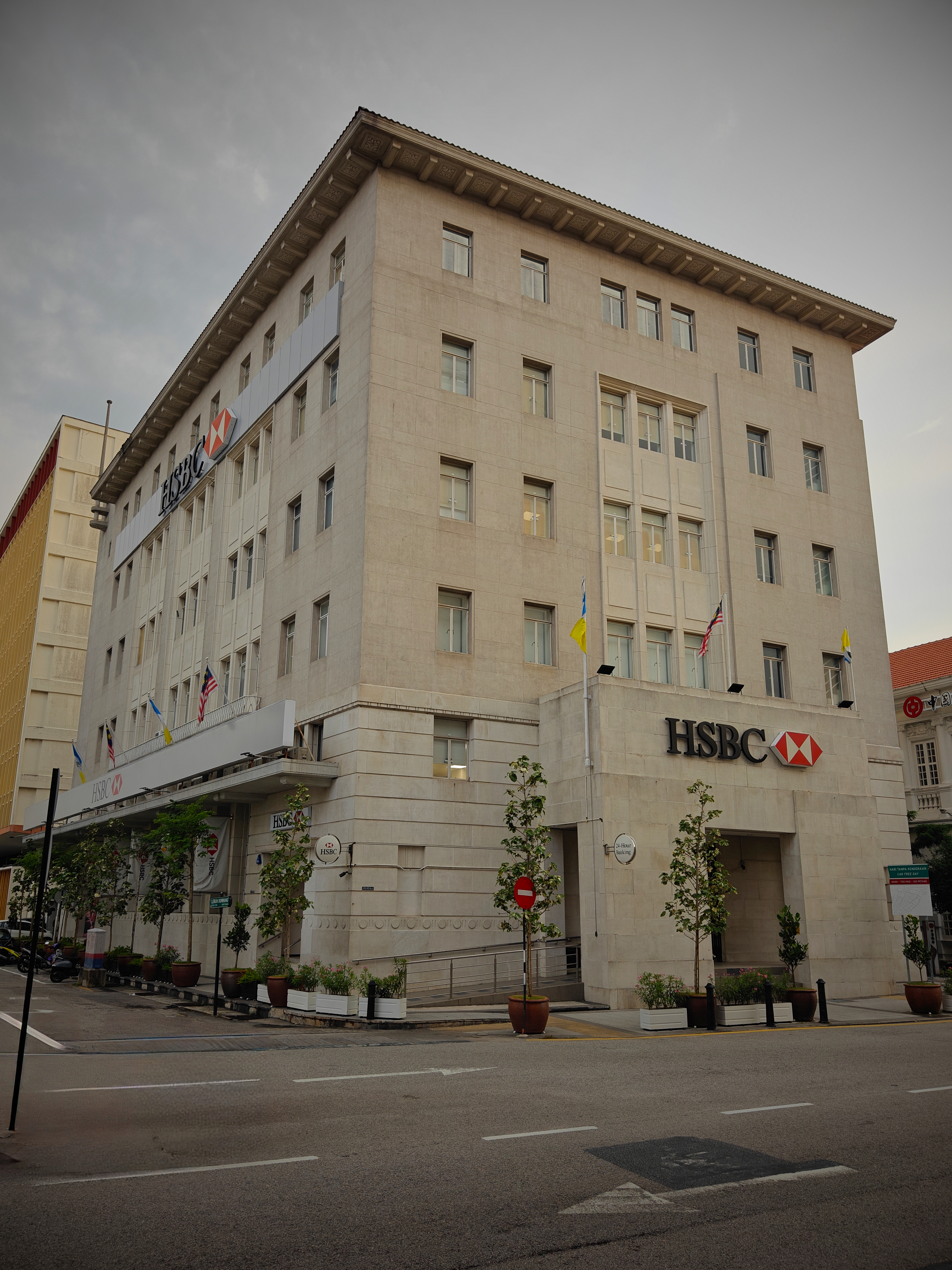
- Interactive map of the HSBC Building area

General information
- Architectural style: Art Deco
- Location: 1 Downing Street, George Town, Penang, Malaysia, George Town, Malaysia
- Coordinates: 5.41825°N 100.34334°E
- Current tenants: HSBC
- Completed: 1951
- Opened: 1951
- Owner: HSBC

Height
- Top floor: 6

Technical details
- Floor count: 6

The HSBC Building is a historical building in George Town within the Malaysian state of Penang. Opened in 1951, the office building, situated at Downing Street within the city's Central Business District, houses the Penang branch of HSBC.

== History ==
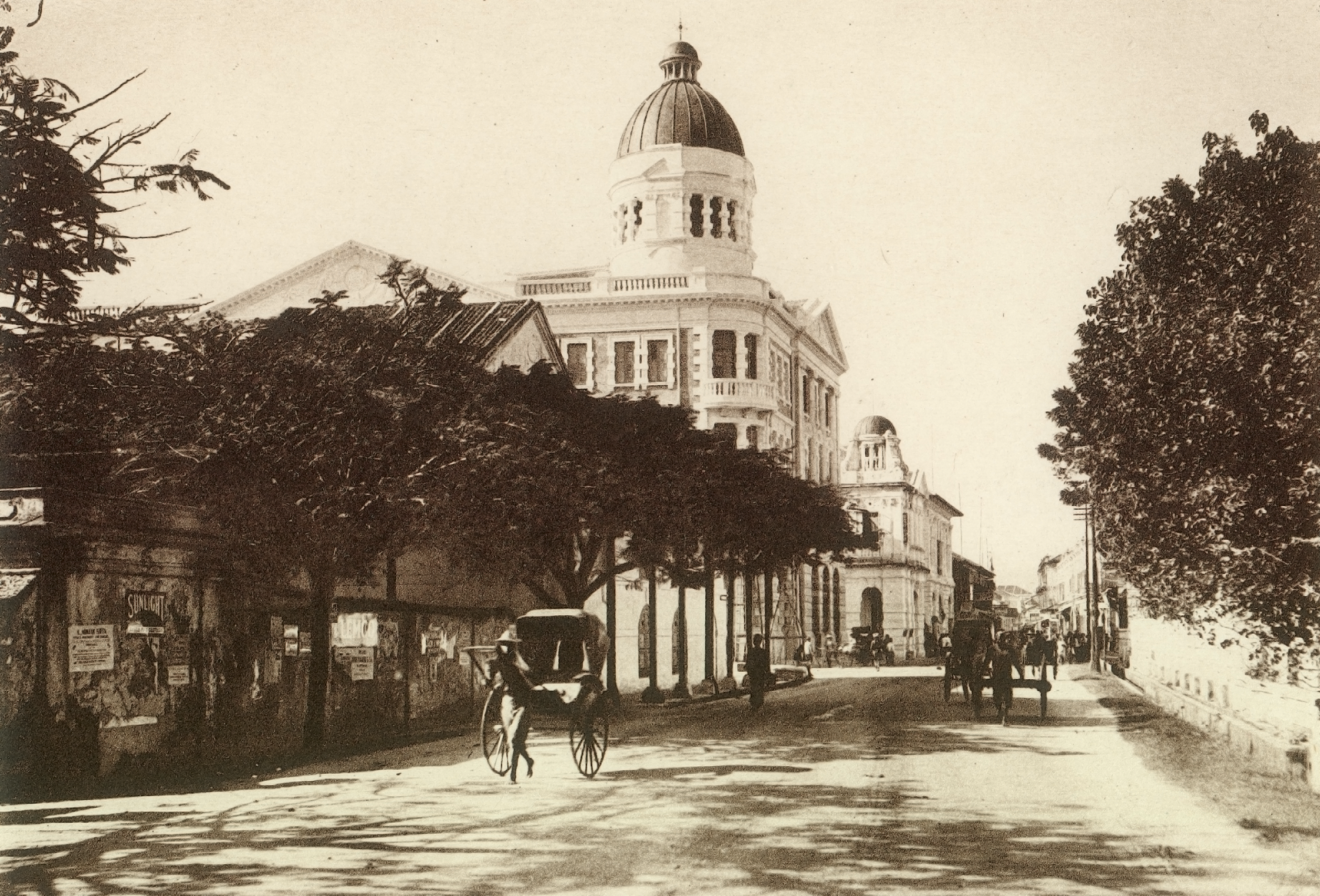
The original HSBC Building, designed in Neoclassical style and bedecked with a domed tower, c. 1910.

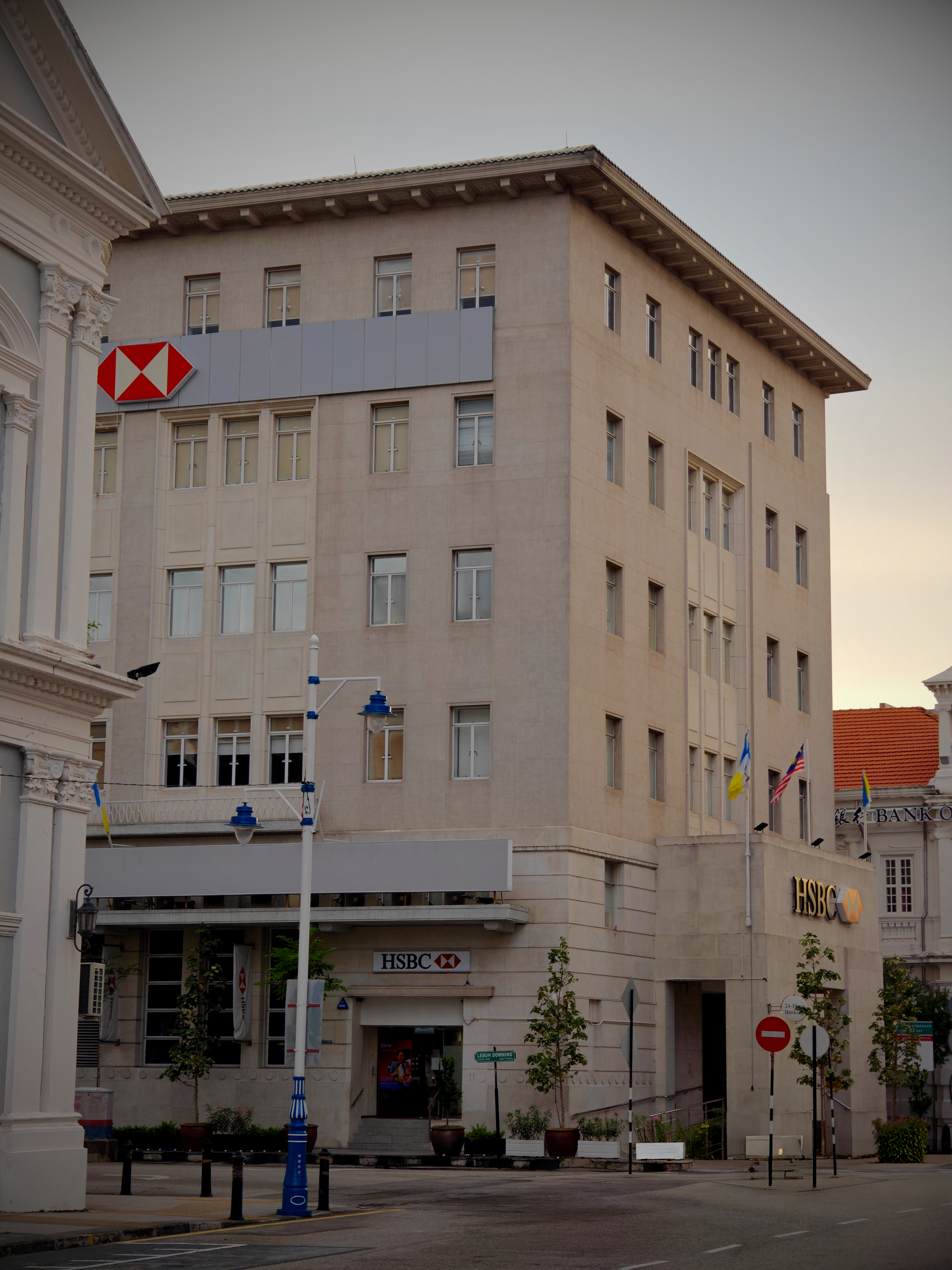
Side façade of the HSBC Building in 2024.

HSBC established its presence in Malaysia in 1884 with the opening of its first branch in George Town. The branch was initially housed within the Logan Building at Beach Street.

The present-day HSBC Building occupies the site that was previously home to a telegraph office. As banks began to establish offices around the northern end of Beach Street, HSBC acquired the site and commissioned a three-storey building with a domed tower. The building was designed by architects and civil engineers Wilson & Neubronner in Neoclassical style, with its domed tower bearing resemblance to that of the adjacent Bank of China Building. Construction was completed at a cost of $250,000 (Straits dollar) and HSBC moved into the premises in 1906. The building, standing at a height of 120 ft (37 m), was considered the tallest in George Town until the completion of the nearby railway station, and held the distinction of being the first in Penang to be equipped with electric lifts.

The original HSBC building was destroyed by Allied bombardment during World War II. Following the war, in 1948, HSBC made the decision to reconstruct the building while temporarily operating its Penang branch from the India House. By 1949, the 200 piles required to support the new foundations had been driven. The new building cost $1.5 million (Malayan dollar) and was inaugurated by British high commissioner Henry Gurney in 1951. The first building in George Town to be completed after the war, it was also the tallest in the city, until the completion of the adjacent Tuanku Syed Putra Building in 1962.

== Description ==
The building was designed in Art Deco style, featuring elements commonly found in bank offices in Shanghai, which by the time of the building's completion in the early 1950s was already going out of fashion. The lower two levels are rusticated while the four upper floors incorporate a different façade.

== See also ==
- Foo Tye Sin Mansion
- OCBC Building
- Standard Chartered Bank building
