= Bank of China Building (Penang) =

Commercial offices in George Town, Penang, Malaysia

- 中國銀行大廈 (Chinese)
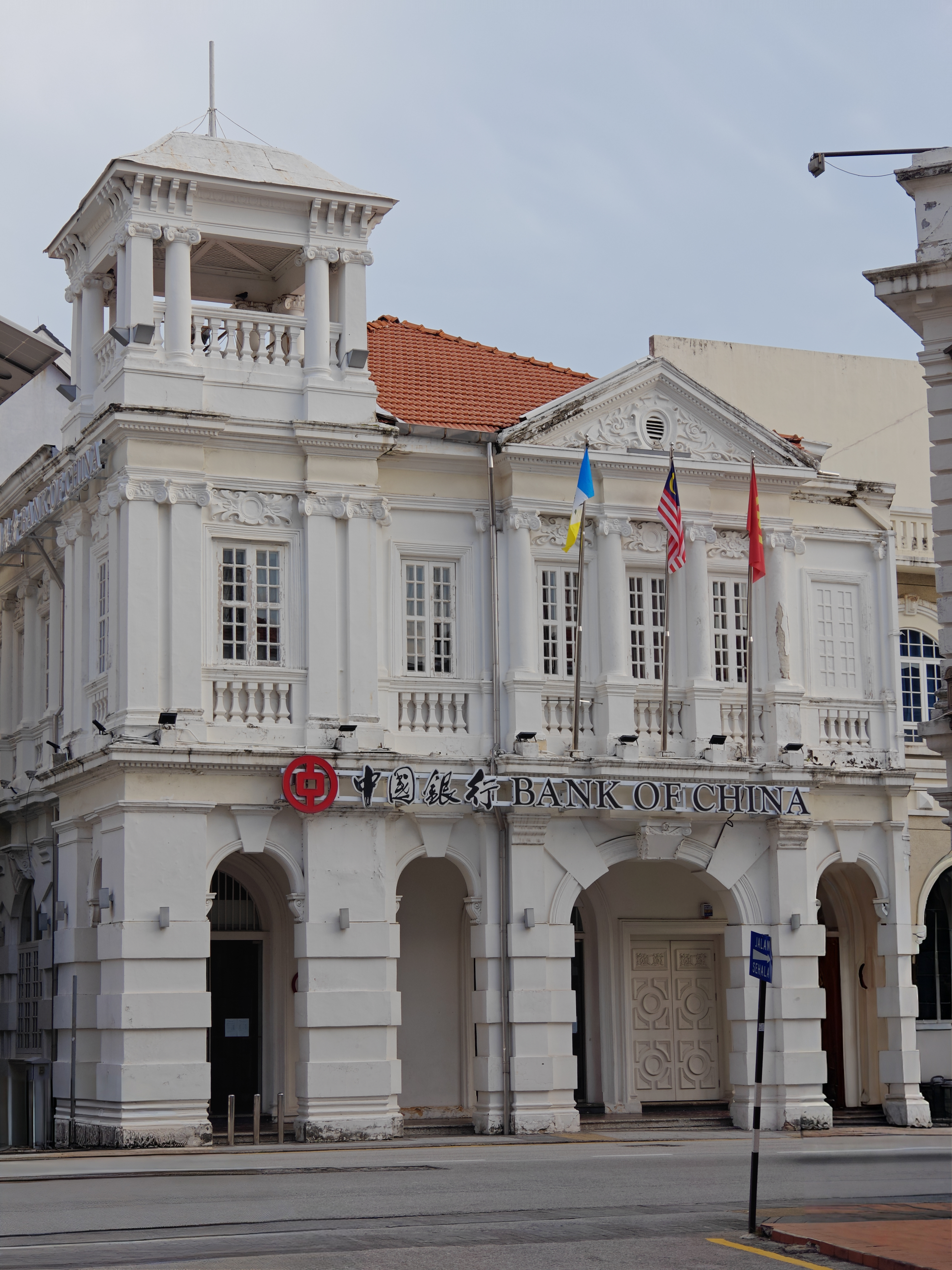
- Interactive map of the Bank of China Building area

General information
- Architectural style: Neoclassical
- Location: 9, Beach Street, George Town, Penang, Malaysia, George Town, Malaysia
- Coordinates: 5.41812°N 100.34314°E
- Current tenants: Bank of China
- Construction started: 1903
- Completed: 1905
- Opened: 1905
- Owner: Bank of China

Height
- Top floor: 2

Technical details
- Floor count: 2
- Grounds: 1,300 m^{2} (14,000 sq ft)

Design and construction
- Architects: Wilson & Neubronner

The Bank of China Building is a historical building in George Town within the Malaysian state of Penang. Completed in 1905, the office building, situated at Beach Street within the city's Central Business District (CBD), originally served as the offices of the Netherlands Trading Society (NTS). Following a series of acquisitions, the building changed ownership multiple times. It was acquired by Algemene Bank Nederland, then by ABN AMRO and the Royal Bank of Scotland. Eventually, it was sold to the Bank of China, which relocated its Penang branch to the building in 2017.

== History ==
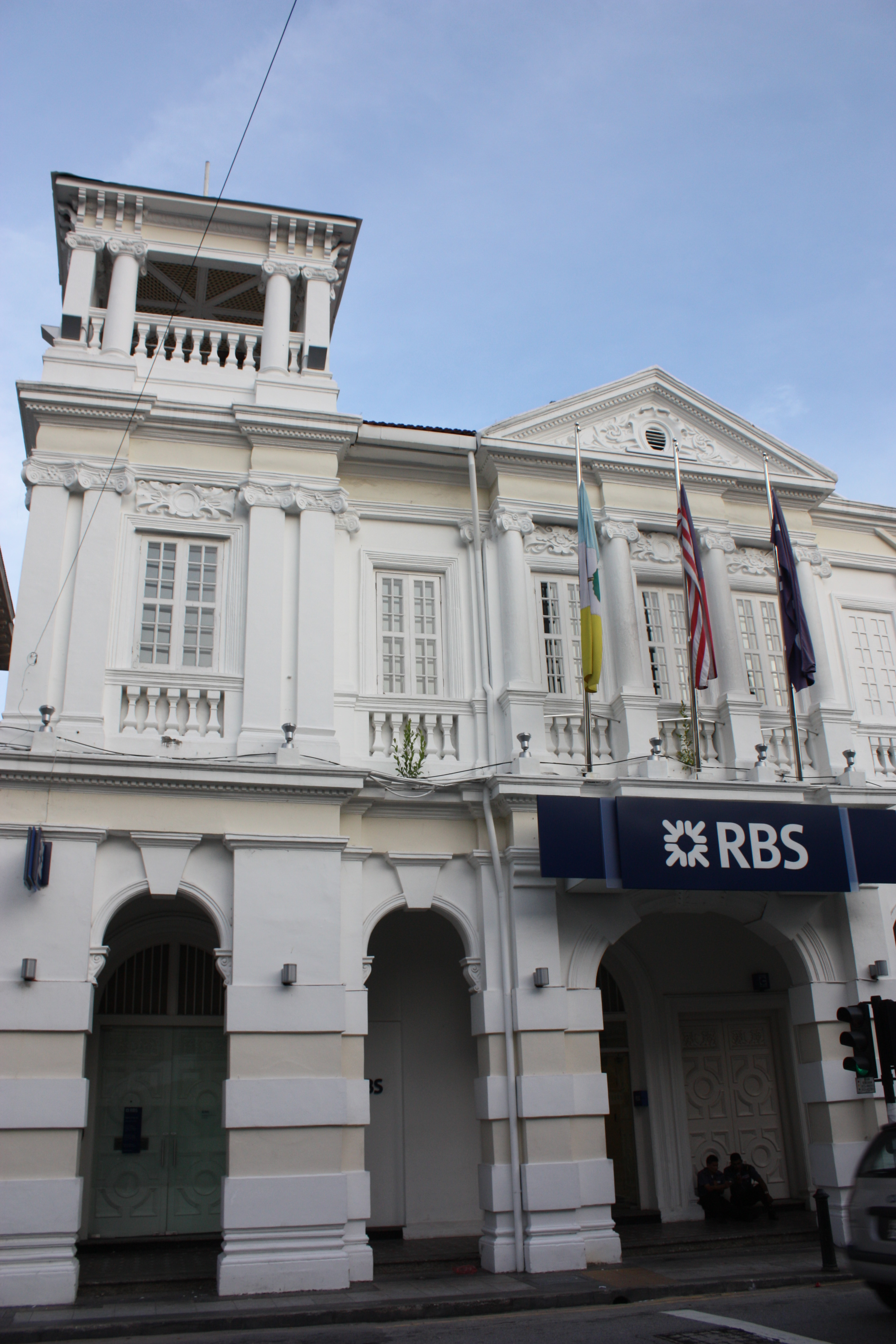
The building c. 2009, when it was owned by the Royal Bank of Scotland.

Scott and Co., which was owned by Francis Light's trading partner James Scott, had originally built seafronting warehouses along Beach Street. In 1903, the Netherlands Trading Society (NTS) acquired a portion of the warehouses that was occupied by the Criterion Tiffin Rooms. The NTS was in the midst of building its presence in the Dutch East Indies and by 1888, it had opened a branch in George Town.

The present-day building, on the site acquired by the NTS, was designed by architects and civil engineers Wilson & Neubronner. Completed in 1905, the building originally faced Crown Road, where the British East India Company's offices were located. The road and offices have since been demolished to make way for the present-day HSBC Building.

In 1964, the NTS was merged into Algemene Bank Nederland, which in turn was merged with AMRO Bank to form ABN AMRO in 1991. In 2007, ABN AMRO was acquired by a consortium consisting of the Royal Bank of Scotland (RBS), Fortis and Banco Santander. The 2008 financial crisis forced a restructuring exercise that placed the Penang branch under RBS.

As a result of continued losses, RBS opted to consolidate its global operations, leading to the sale of the building in 2014 as part of its consolidation process. The decision to sell the building in its original state was supported by local historians concerned about the potential demolition of the building. The Bank of China eventually acquired the building and relocated its Penang branch to the premises in 2017.

== Description ==
The building was designed in Neoclassical style, featuring a series of arches rendered with keystoning. The turret was initially designed with a domed shape, but it was later modified to its current square shape.

== See also ==
- Standard Chartered Bank building
- HSBC Building
- OCBC Building
- Foo Tye Sin Mansion
