= Standard Chartered Bank building, Penang =

Commercial offices at Beach Street in George Town, Penang

Standard Chartered Bank bulilding
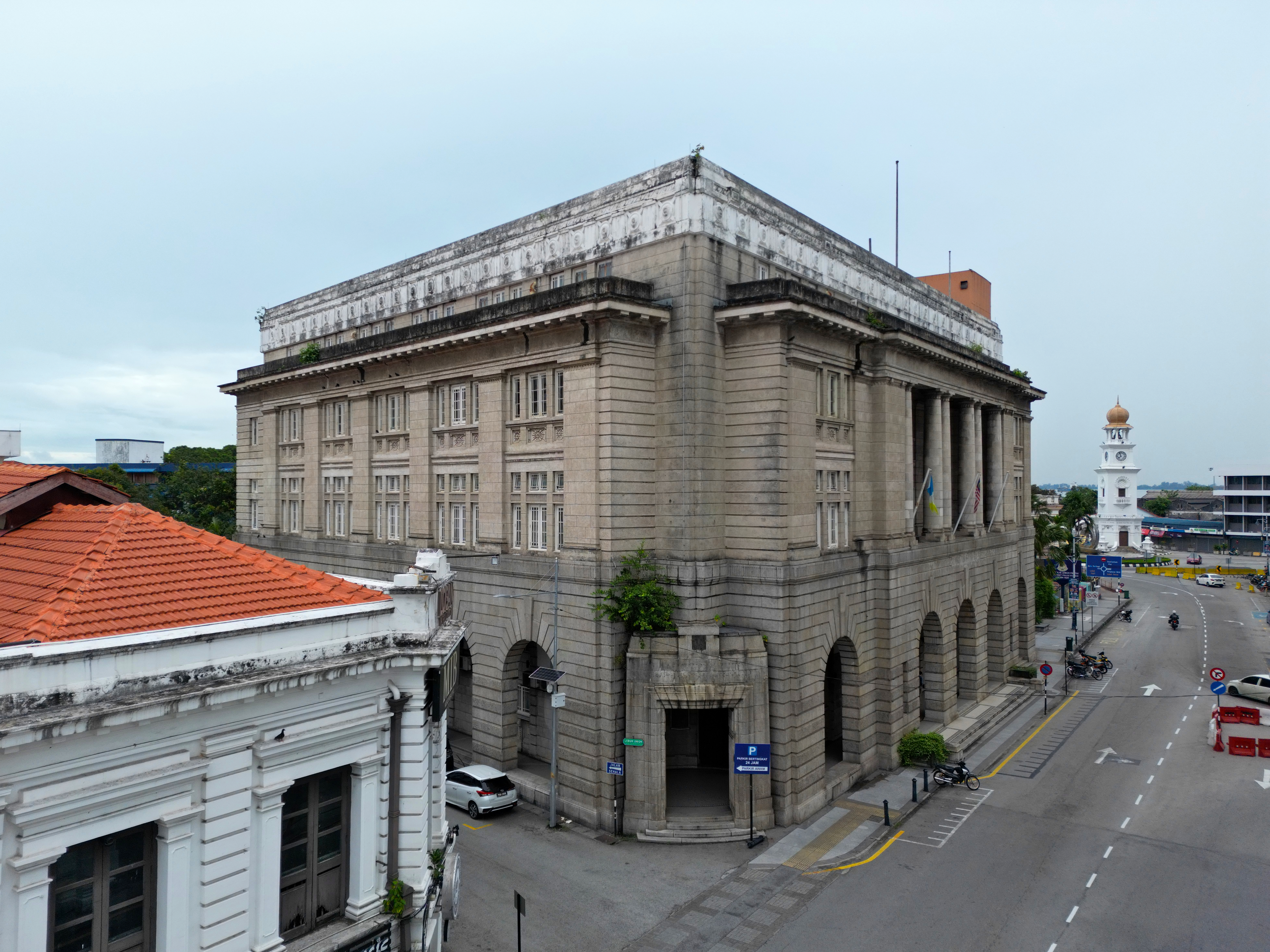
- Interactive map of the Standard Chartered Bank bulilding area

General information
- Location: Standard Chartered Building, 2, Beach Street, George Town, Penang, Malaysia, George Town, Malaysia
- Coordinates: 5.418588°N 100.343298°E
- Current tenants: IWG plc
- Construction started: 1926
- Completed: 1930
- Opened: 1930
- Owner: Mercury Securities Sdn. Bhd.

Height
- Top floor: 4

Technical details
- Floor count: 4

Design and construction
- Architects: Stark and McNeil

The Standard Chartered Bank building, alternatively No. 2 Beach Street, is a historical building in George Town within the Malaysian state of Penang. Completed in 1930, the office building, situated at Beach Street within the city's Central Business District (CBD), was one of the tallest in the city at that time. It served as the Penang branch of Standard Chartered until 2017, after which the bank relocated to its new premise down the street. The building has since been reopened as Spaces Beach Street, one of IWG's coworking spaces in Malaysia.

== History ==
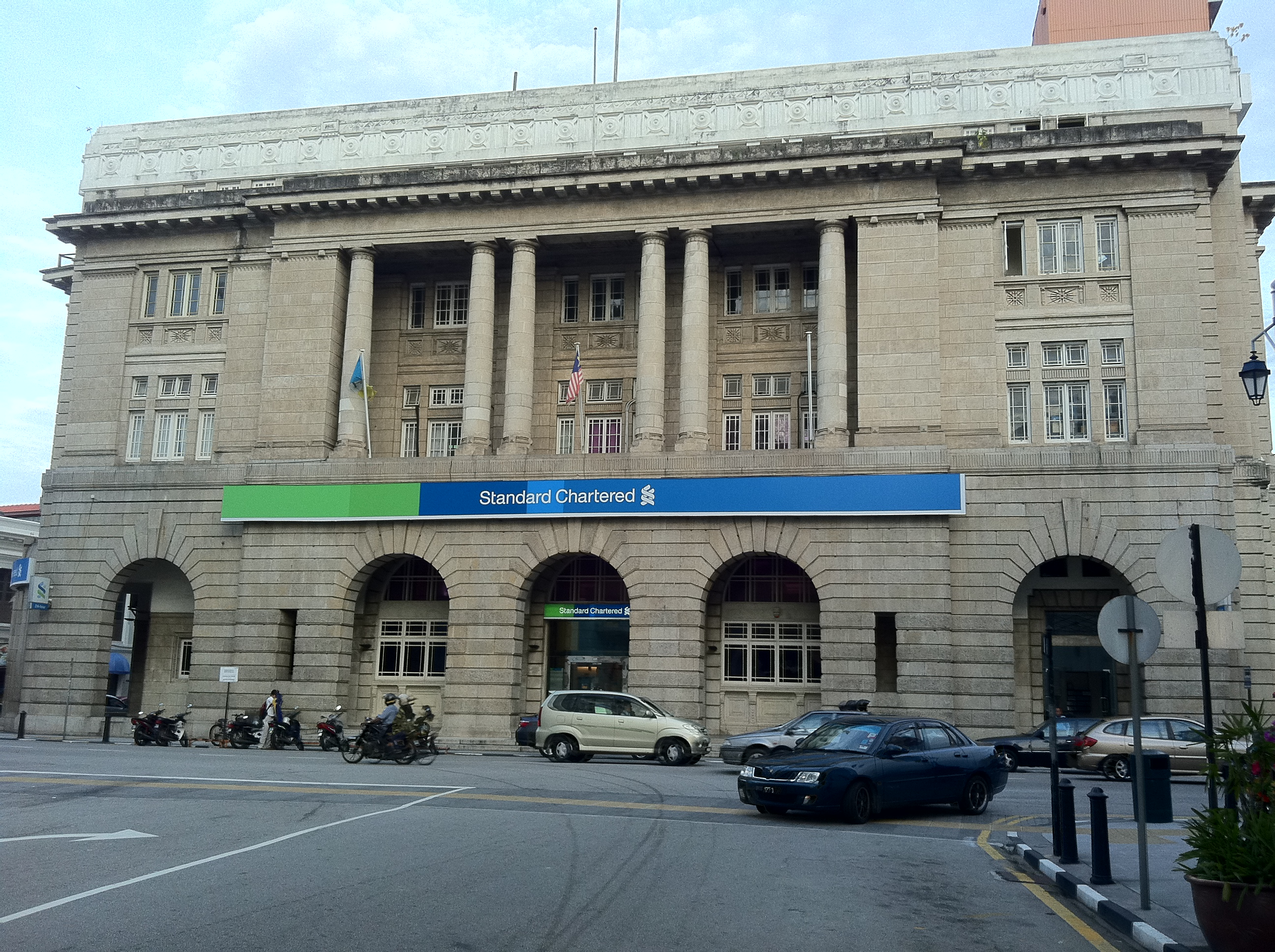
Standard Chartered Bank building in 2012, prior to the relocation of Standard Chartered's Penang branch

The Chartered Bank of India, Australia and China (known as Chartered Bank), a British bank established in 1853 was established in Penang in 1875. It is the oldest bank branch in Malaysia, and was the leading bank in colonial Malaya, later, in 1969, merging with Standard Bank to form Standard Chartered Bank.

After opening at Beach Street, it relocated several times along the road, moving into premises at No. 11 in 1875 where it remained until 1930.

After the First World War, the bank saw the need for additional space and acquired the site at No. 2 Beach Street which was occupied by the old Central Police Station. The site occupied approximately 20,000 square feet with a frontage on Beach Street of 154 feet and 156 feet on Union Street.

Plans were approved for the construction of the new premises in 1925. The architects appointed were Stark and McNeil, the contractors were Chin Ah Chin and Yong Ah Shing, and resident engineer was Steen Sehested. However, construction was delayed due to problems with the foundations, and the building was not completed until 1930.

The new office building, formerly opened at a ceremony on 30 January 1930, was evidently a success as the bank remained in occupation for the next 87 years. A major renovation was carried out in 1992 when the original banking hall was redesigned, and it finally vacated the building in 2017, moving once again along Beach Street to more modest premises at No. 86 where it remains today. IWG plc subsequently took a lease of the building and in 2019 opened Spaces Beach Street, the company's second coworking space in Malaysia after Spaces Platinum Central in Kuala Lumpur.

== Description ==
The square-shaped, four-storey building is 80 feet high with the ground floor faced with granite and features an arcade to provide shade. The frontal facade of the upper floors features a veranda with a Doric colonnade surmounted by a Parthenonic frieze.

The ground and mezzanine floors were occupied by the bank whilst the upper floors, consisting of offices, were let to tenants. The floor of the bank was paved with marble and mosaics, and featured a U-shaped, teak counter with bronze grills. The manager's office with its panelled walls was adjacent to the bank's two strongrooms with security doors and locks provided by Chubb and Son. On the mezzanine floor were two further strongrooms for the bank's documents and records.

== See also ==
- Bank of China Building
- Foo Tye Sin Mansion
- HSBC Building
- OCBC Building
