= OCBC Building (Penang) =

Commercial offices in George Town, Penang, Malaysia

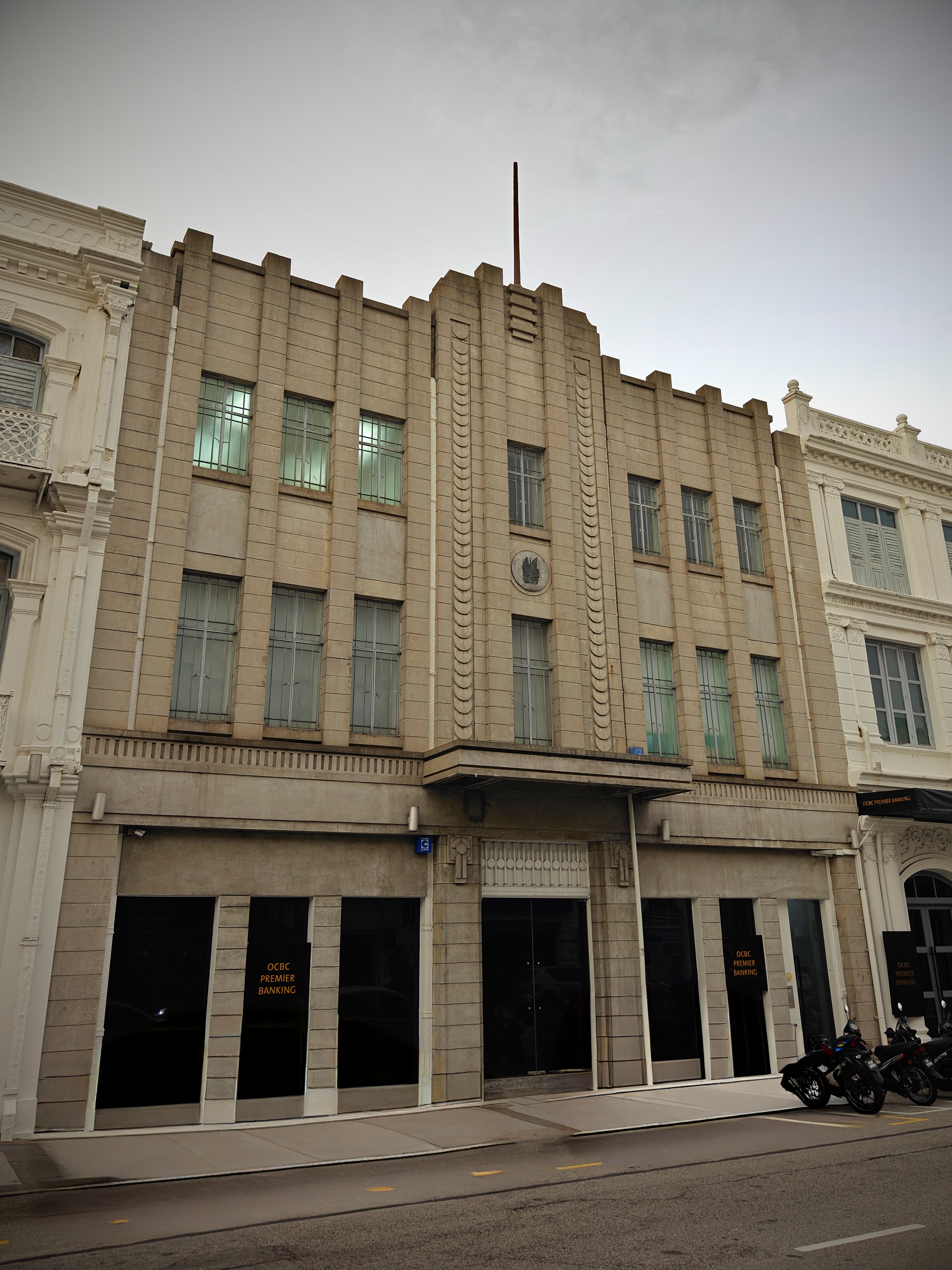
- Interactive map of the OCBC Building area

General information
- Architectural style: Art Deco
- Location: 28–30, Beach Street, George Town, Penang, Malaysia, George Town, Malaysia
- Coordinates: 5.41725°N 100.34192°E
- Current tenants: OCBC Bank
- Completed: 1938
- Opened: 1938
- Owner: OCBC Bank

Height
- Top floor: 3

Technical details
- Floor count: 3

Design and construction
- Architect: Charles Geoffrey Boutcher

The OCBC Building is a historical building in George Town within the Malaysian state of Penang. Completed in 1938, the office building, situated at Beach Street within the city's Central Business District (CBD), forms part of the Penang branch of the OCBC Bank.

== History ==
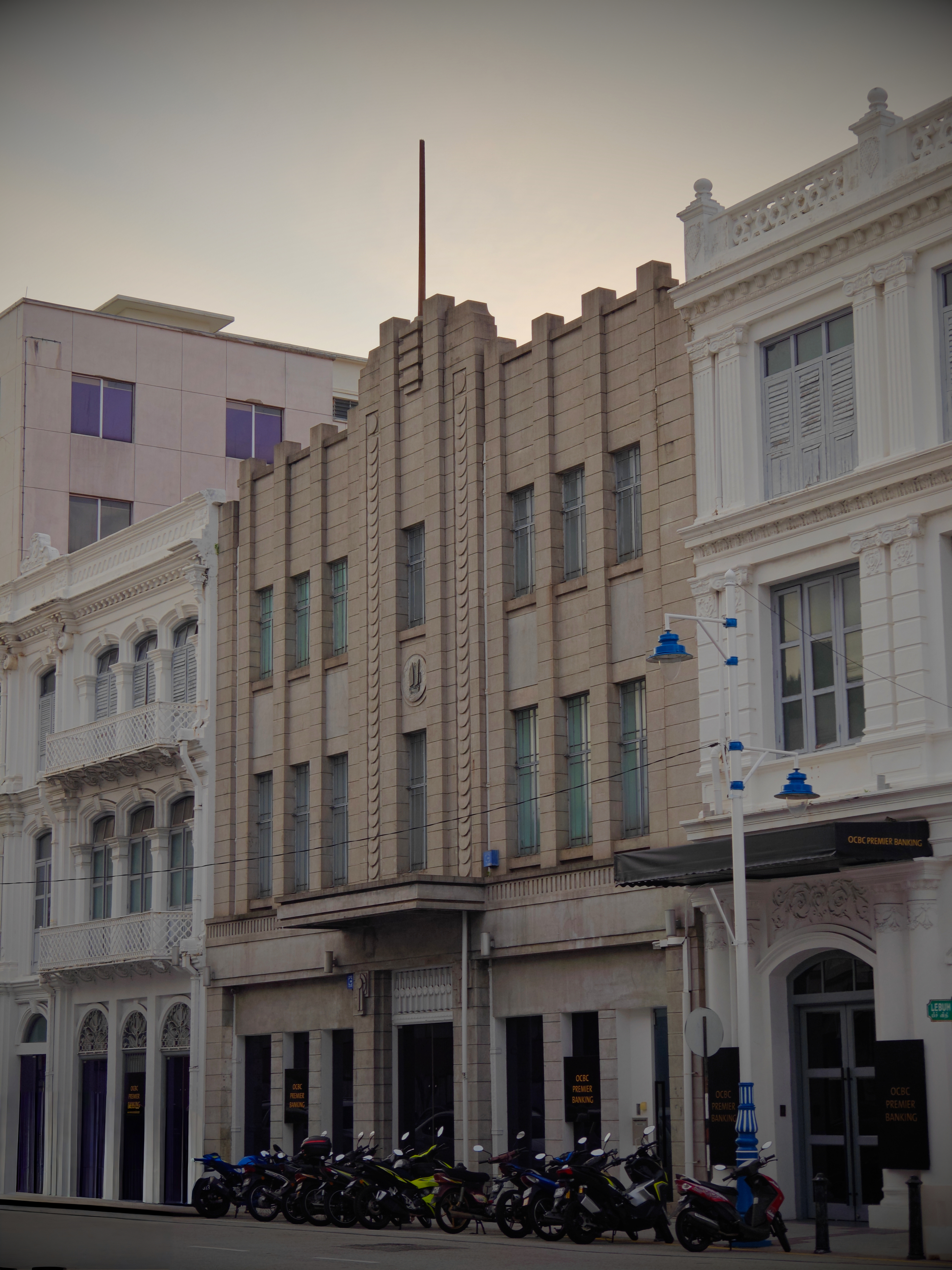
The OCBC Building, along with the 1886 Building (left) and Kongsoon House (right), have been converted into OCBC's premier banking centre.

Singapore-based Oversea-Chinese Bank Limited – a predecessor to the OCBC Bank – opened its Penang branch at 24 Beach Street in 1920. It moved to the present-day site in the following year. After the Wall Street crash of 1929, the Oversea-Chinese Bank merged with the Chinese Commercial Bank and Ho Hong Bank to form OCBC in 1932.

As the economy rebounded, OCBC's Penang branch was reopened in 1934. The building, originally constructed in the 1880s, underwent renovations that were completed by 1938, incorporating designs from Charles Geoffrey Boutcher. In the 1960s, OCBC relocated its Penang branch to a newly constructed building nearby.

In 2014, OCBC launched its new premier banking centre, which includes the current building as well as adjacent structures such as the 1886 Building and Kongsoon House. The premier banking centre, costing RM5 million, is OCBC's largest in Malaysia, spanning a total of 8,000 sq ft (740 m^{2}).

== Description ==
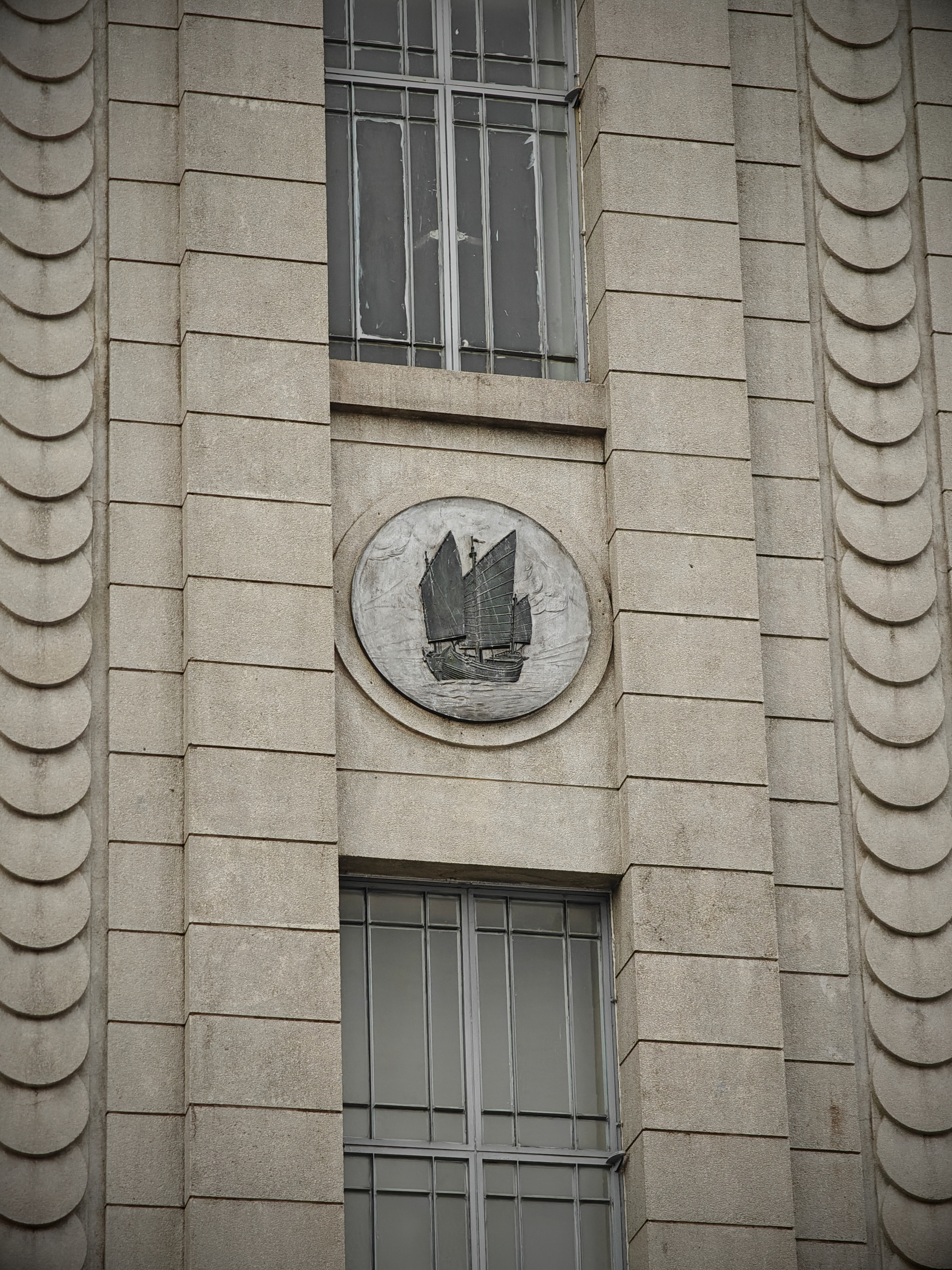
The old logo of OCBC Bank on the façade is unchanged since the 1930s.

The building was designed in Art Deco style, featuring a dull grey façade surfaced in Shanghai plaster. The top two levels were constructed with vertical plaster columns, incorporating a ring motif that frames the central section.

== See also ==
- Bank of China Building
- Foo Tye Sin Mansion
- HSBC Building
- Standard Chartered Bank building
