= Eng Chuan Tong Tan Kongsi =

Clan house in Malaysia

Eng Chuan Tong
- 穎川堂陳公司/颖川堂陈公司
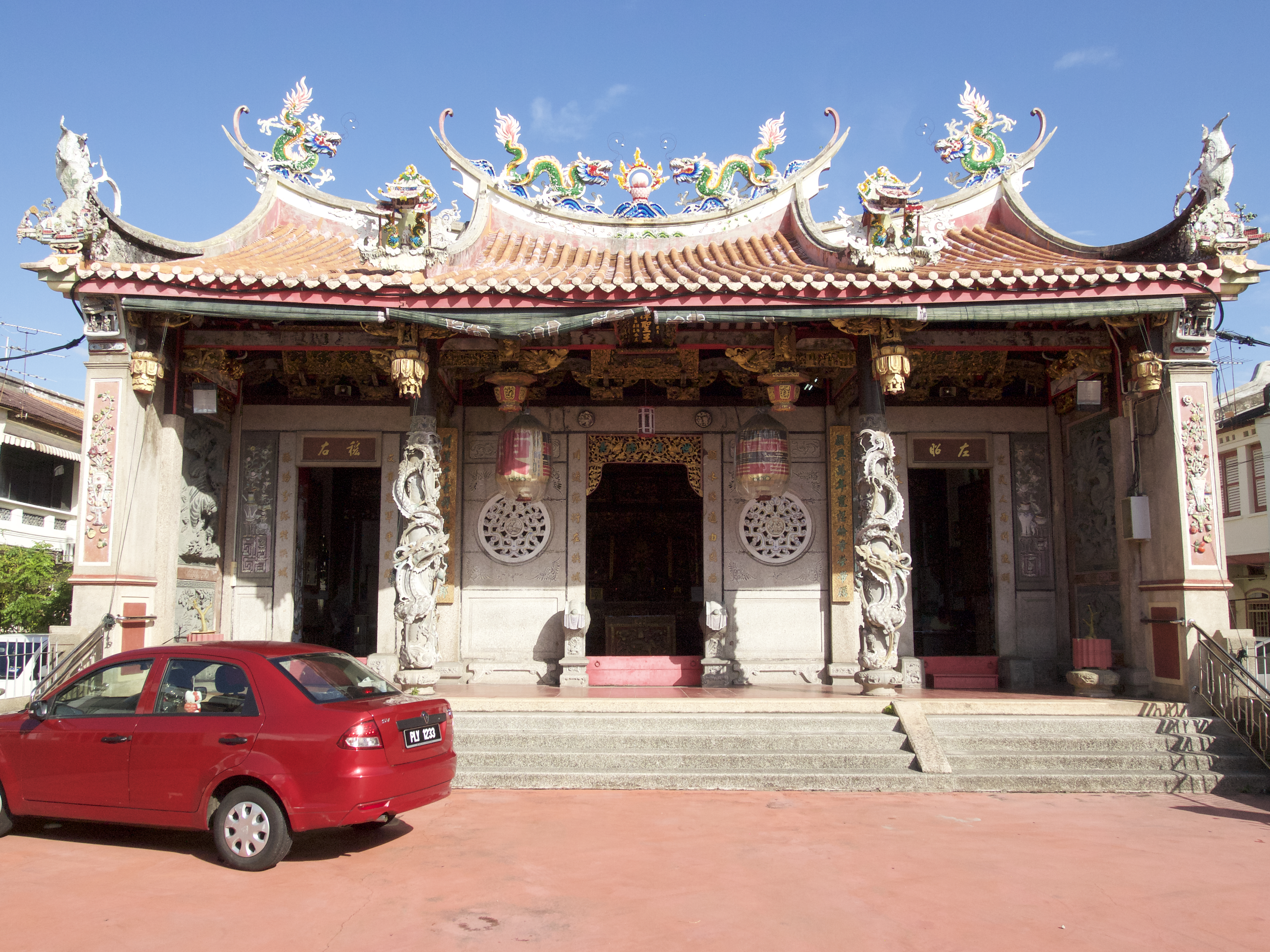

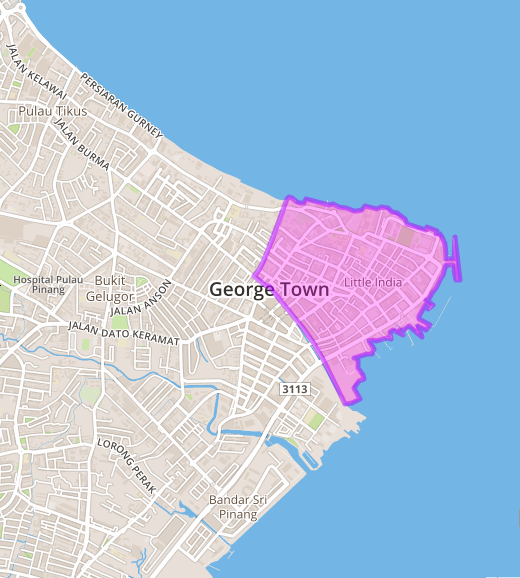
- Location within central George Town, Penang

General information
- Type: Hokkien clan house
- Architectural style: Chinese
- Location: Seh Tan Court, Beach Street, 10300 George Town, Penang, Malaysia, George Town, Penang, Malaysia
- Coordinates: 5.413184°N 100.336338°E
- Current tenants: Tan Kongsi
- Completed: 1878; 148 years ago
- Cost: $35,000
- Owner: Tan Kongsi

UNESCO World Heritage Site
- Type: Cultural
- Criteria: ii, iii, iv
- Designated: 2008 (32nd session)
- Part of: George Town UNESCO Core Zone
- Reference no.: 1223
- Region: Asia-Pacific

Eng Chuan Tong Tan Kongsi (Chinese: 穎川堂陳公司; Pe̍h-ōe-jī: Éng-chhoan-tông Tân-kong-si) is a Hokkien clan house at Beach Street in George Town, Penang, Malaysia. It was founded in the early 19th century by a Tan family from the Fujian province of Zhangzhou in China. The building is a place of worship devoted to Kai Zhang Sheng Wang (開漳聖王; Pe̍h-ōe-jī: Khai-chiang Sèng-ông) or Tan Goan-kong (陳元光), the founder of Zhangzhou, and his two deputies, Generals Fushun and Fusheng. It was also the ancestral temple of Tan clansmen for the purposes of cultural integration. Members of the Tan family worship their ancestor, Tan Guan Kong.

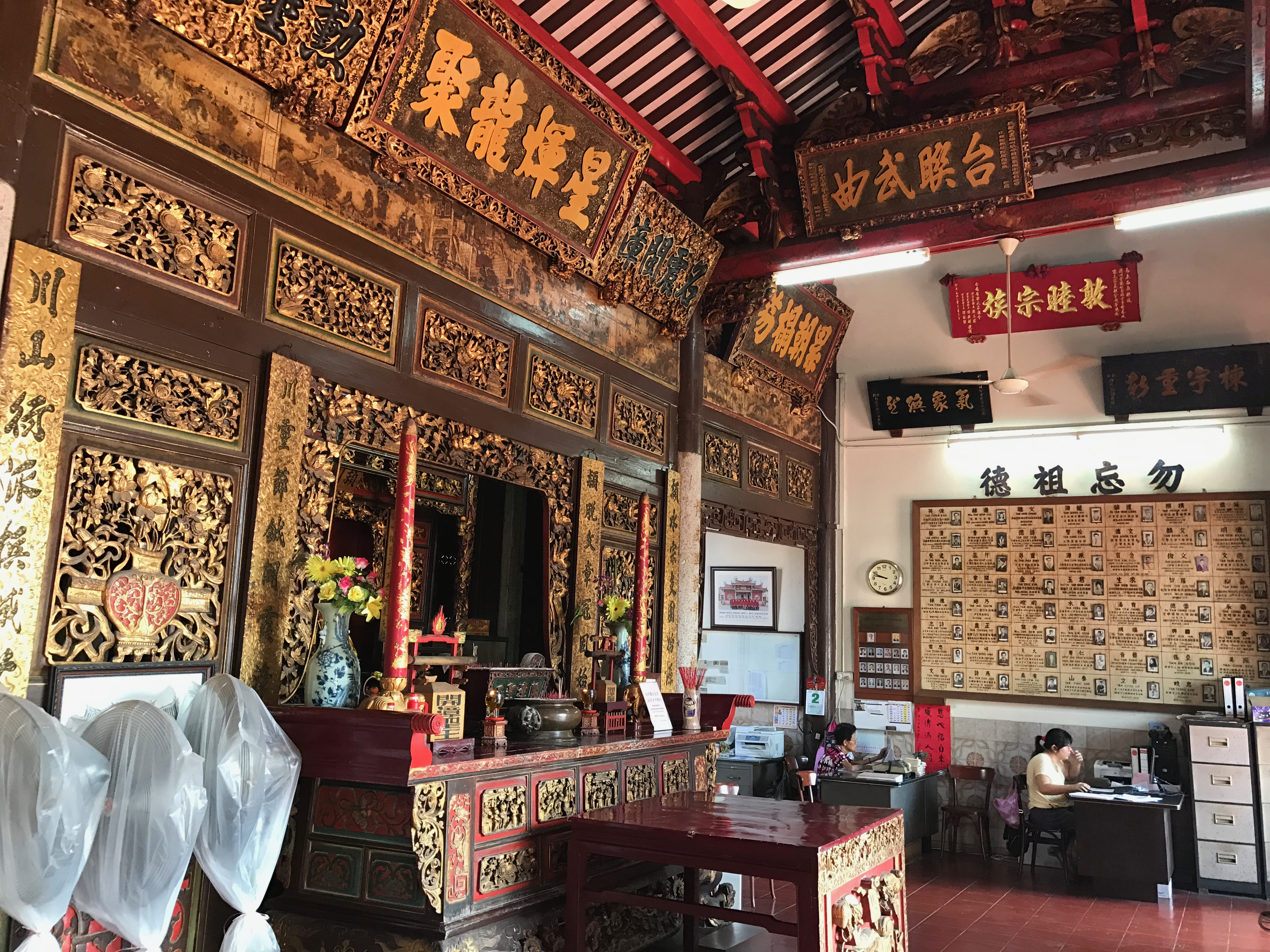
Reception and administration area.

This Kongsi represents what locals consider to be one of the ‘Big Five' clan surnames in Penang. Founded under the name Tan Seng Ong Kongsi, it is claimed by its owners to be the oldest clan house in Penang. The clan house and its associated residences form a culturally embedded Seh Tan Court.

In 1941, from the start of the Japanese Occupation, many historic relics vanished, and activities were suspended except for Chinese New Year and the Mid-Autumn Festival. In recent years, clan members have attended two annual ceremonies of ancestral worship.

In the early 1900s, a Tan Si School was established, which was later renamed Eng Chuan School. It was one of several schools in Penang which taught Confucian classics as a main part of the curriculum.

The main structure was erected in 1878, then renovated in the late 1940s, and again in the 1990s. The building is located at number 28 Seh Tan Court, George Town (off Beach Street).
