= Malaysia Architecture Museum =

Museum in Melaka Tengah, Malacca, Malaysia

- Muzium Seni Bina Malaysia
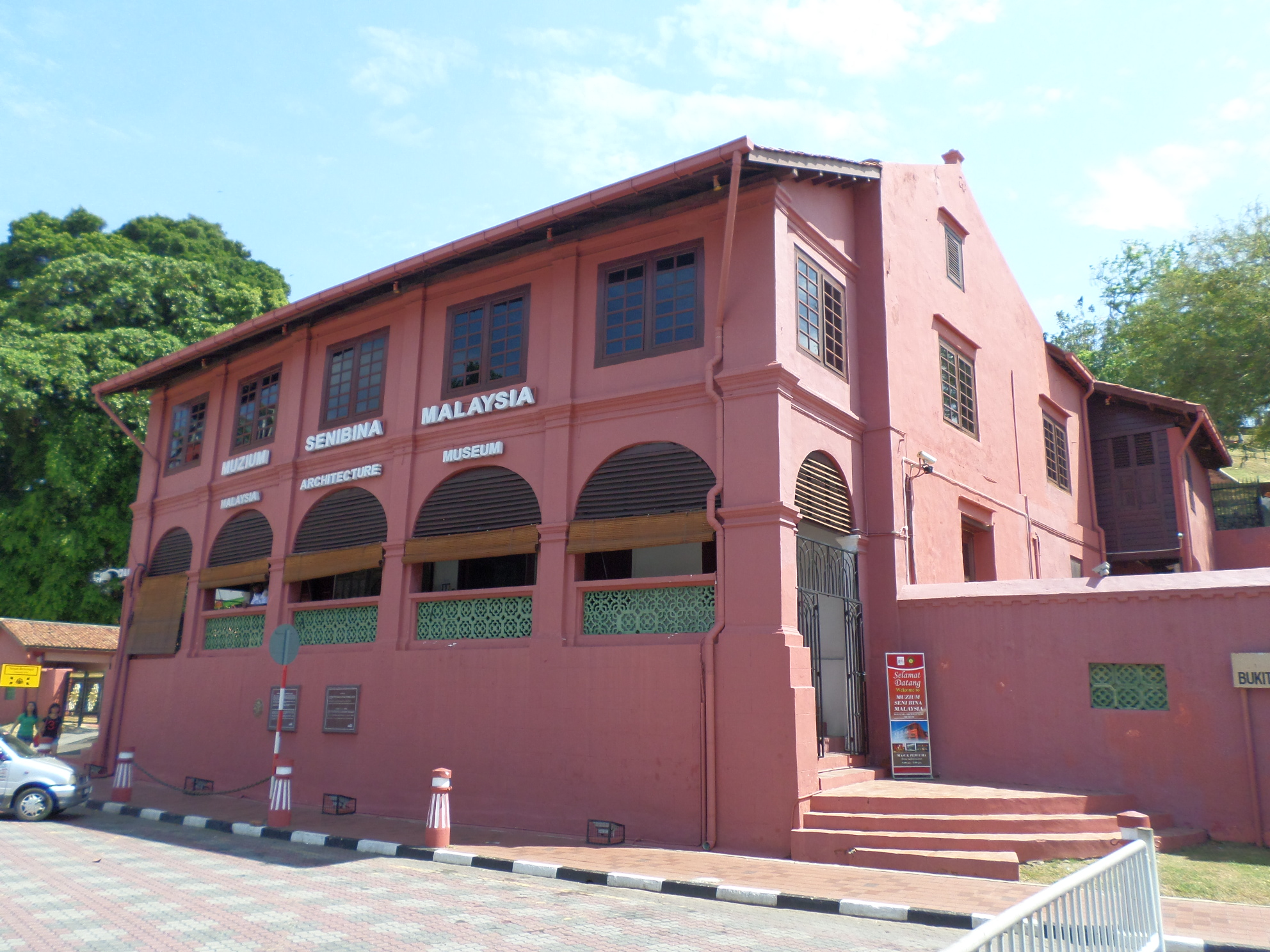
- Established: 2004
- Location: Malacca City, Malacca, Malaysia
- Coordinates: 2°11′33.8″N 102°14′54.8″E
- Type: museum

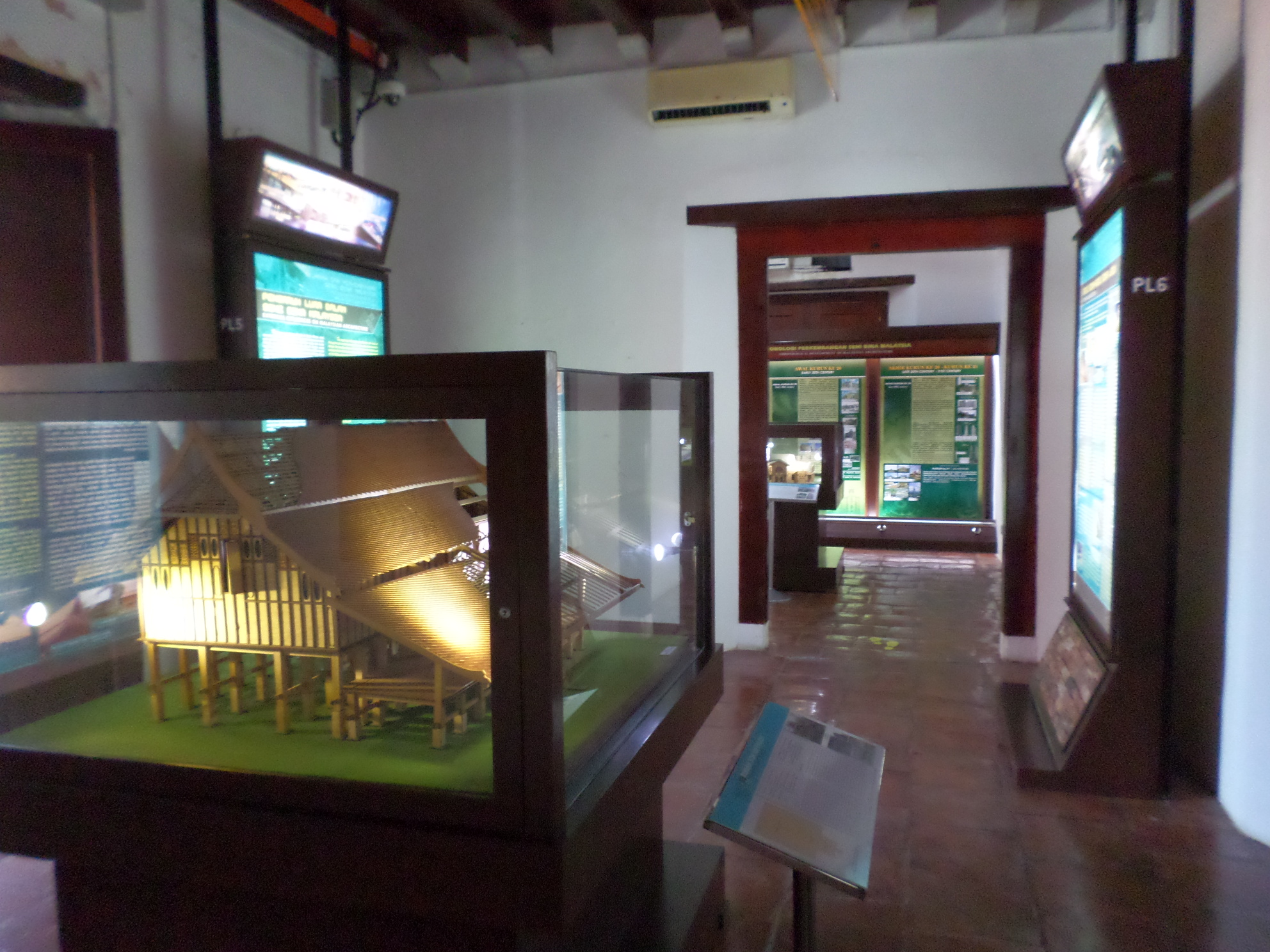
Malaysia Architecture Museum exhibition hall

The Malaysia Architecture Museum (Malay: Muzium Seni Bina Malaysia) is an architecture museum in Malacca City, Malacca, Malaysia which exhibits various architectural materials, building models and concepts.

The museum's building is Dutch in style, as it was built during the Dutch period in the 18th century as the residence and administration center of the Dutch officials. During the British Malaya period, the building was used as an administrative office. After the independence of Malaya in 1957, the building became the office of Malacca Water Board. In 2000, the building was restored to its original shape by the department of Museum and Antiquities. The museum was opened in 2004 and it is administered under the Antiquity and Museum Association.

The building consists of two floors, which is divided into:

- Ground floor
  - Introduction
  - Historical Development of Malaysian Architecture
  - Architecture and Beliefs
- Upper floor
  - The Typology
  - Carvings and Motifs
  - Tools and Technology
  - Materials

== See also ==
- List of museums in Malaysia
- List of tourist attractions in Malacca
