= Hang Li Poh's Well =

Water well in Melaka City, Melaka, Malaysia

- Perigi Hang Li Poh
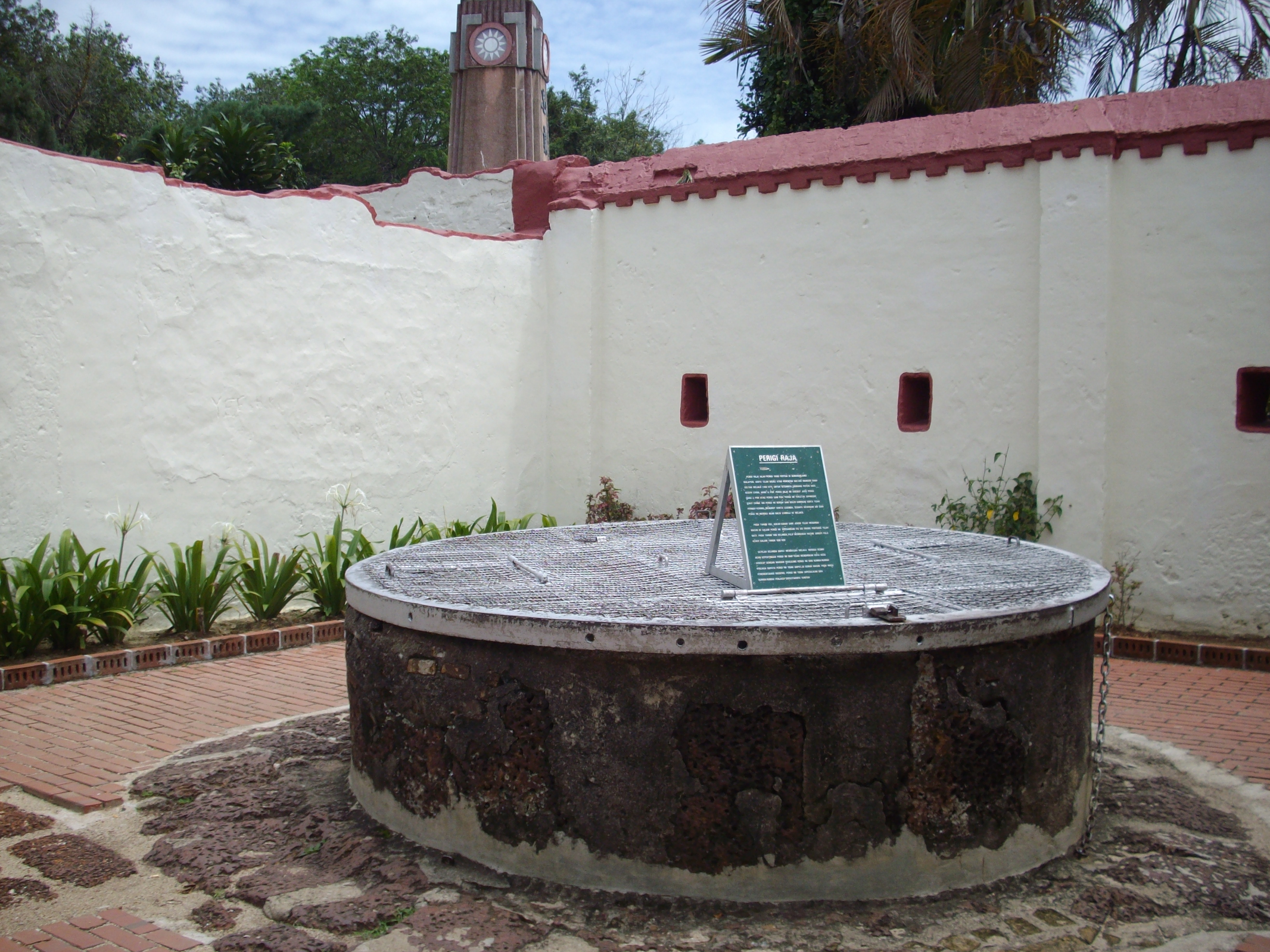
- Interactive map of the Hang Li Poh's Well area

General information
- Type: former water well
- Location: Melaka City, Melaka, Malaysia
- Coordinates: 2°11′45.5″N 102°15′19.4″E
- Completed: 1459

The Hang Li Poh's Well (Malay: Perigi Hang Li Poh), also known as King's Well, is a historical water well in Melaka City, Melaka, Malaysia. It is the oldest water well in Malaysia.

== History ==
The well was built in 1459 by the followers of Hang Li Poh as the main water source in the town. After conquering Malacca in 1511, the Portuguese secured the well and used it as their main water source supply. After conquering Malacca in 1677, the Dutch surrounded the well with solid brick walls to protect the well. However, during the British period, they neglected the well and let it fall into disrepair.

== Function ==
Nowadays the water from the well is not that clean. It has also become a wishing well for visitors.

== See also ==
- List of tourist attractions in Malacca
- Bukit Cina
