= India House, Penang =

Building in George Town, Penang, Malaysia

India House
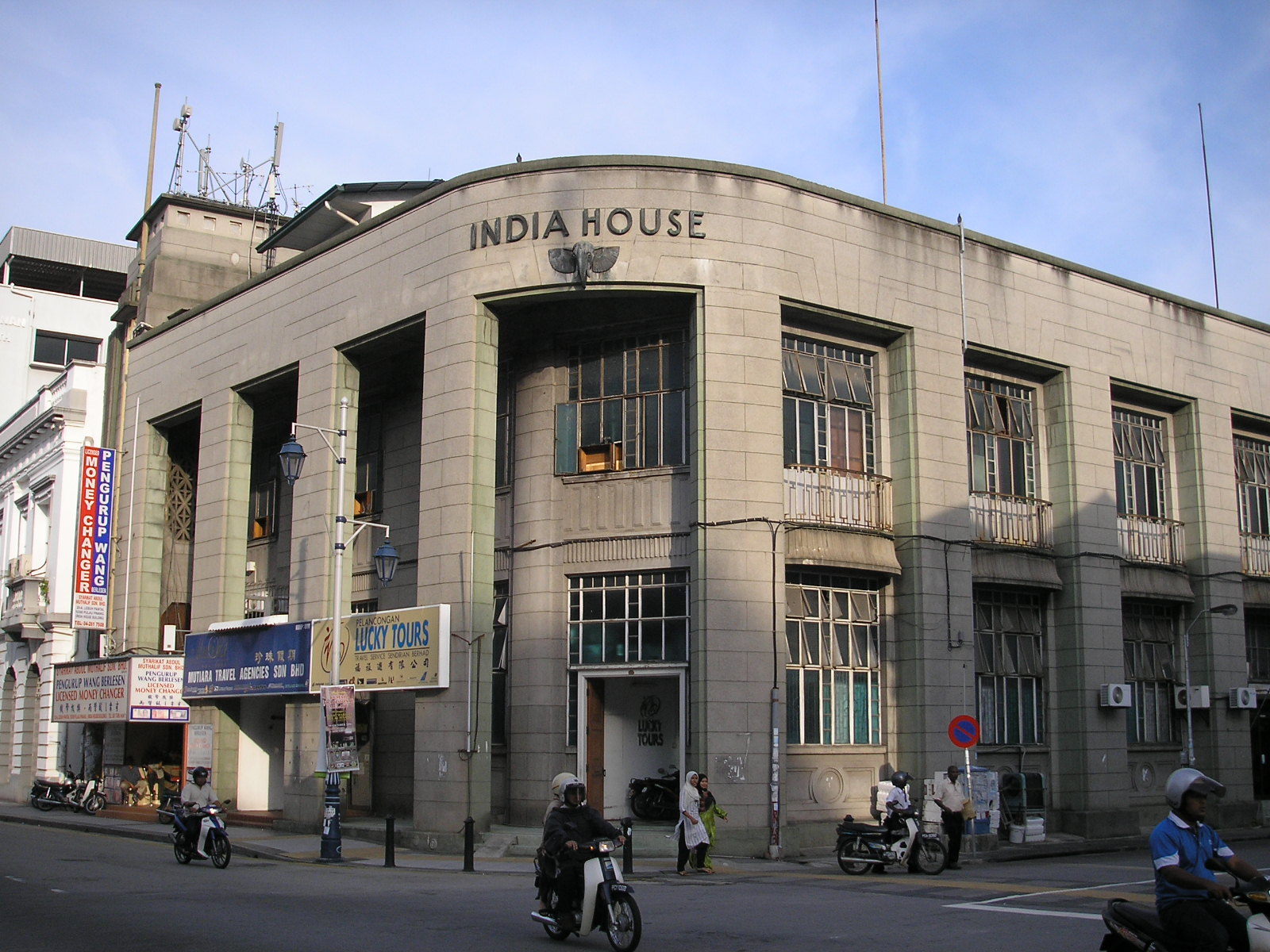
- Interactive map of the India House area

General information
- Location: George Town, Penang, Malaysia
- Coordinates: 5°25′2.7″N 100°20′32.9″E
- Construction started: 1937
- Completed: 1941

Design and construction
- Architect: S.N.A.S Sockalingam Chettiar

The India House is a historical building in George Town within the Malaysian state of Penang. It is located at Beach Street, within the city's Central Business District.

== History ==
In the early 20th century, the land of the building was used by the Huttenbach Brothers & Co. for their business. The present building was constructed in 1937. During the Japanese occupation of Malaya in World War II, the building was left unoccupied. Following the destruction of the earlier George Town Hongkong and Shanghai Banking Corporation headquarters in World War II, the India House served as the location of the bank until the bank returned to the reconstructed HSBC building in 1951. The India House was later used by the United States Information Service until the 1970s.

== Architecture ==
The building is a two-story building with Indian art deco style designed by S.N.A.S Sockalingam Chettiar.

== See also ==
- List of tourist attractions in Penang
