= George Town Dispensary building =

Coordinates: 5°24′59″N 100°20′30″E

- Interactive map of the George Town Dispensary building area

General information
- Location: Corner of Beach Street and China Street Ghaut, George Town, Penang, Malaysia
- Completed: 1923

Design and construction
- Architecture firm: Swan & McLaren

The George Town Dispensary building is a historical building in George Town within the Malaysian state of Penang. It is situated at the corner of Beach Street and China Street Ghaut.

== History ==
George Town Dispensary Limited was incorporated in 1901 after Dr. T. C. Avetoom disposed of his pharmacy, which he had established in Penang in 1889, to the company, receiving in return a major shareholding in the new company. After operating from a small shop in Beach Street, and with branches in Ipoh and Malacca, the company instructed architects Swan & McLaren to design new premises which were opened in 1923.

== Description ==
Designed with elements of the classical style, the main entrance to the three-story building includes two pairs of columns and a rounded pediment within which is inscribed "1923" the year of completion. On the Beach Street side is a five-foot way in front of the premises.
