= Beach Street, George Town =

Road in the Malaysian state of Penang

Beach Street
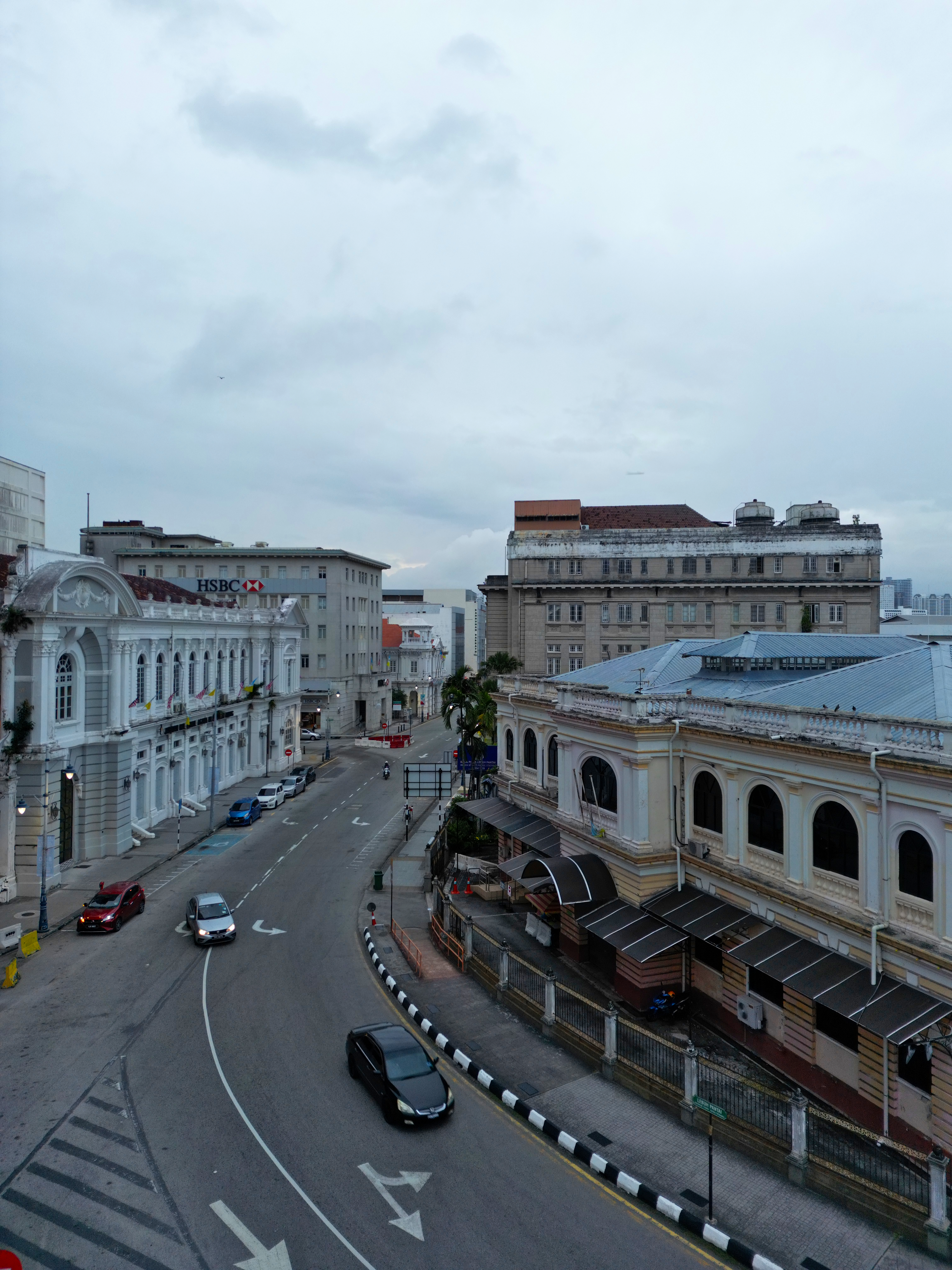
- Native name: Malay: Lebuh Pantai
- Owner: George Town
- Maintained by: Penang Island City Council
- Location: George Town
- Postal code: 10300
- Coordinates: 5.41827°N 100.343144°E
- North end: Light Street
- South end: Prangin Road

Construction
- Inauguration: 1786
- LEBUH PANTAI Beach St10300 P. PINANG

UNESCO World Heritage Site
- Type: Cultural
- Criteria: ii, iii, iv
- Designated: 2008 (32nd session)
- Part of: George Town UNESCO Core Zone
- Reference no.: 1223
- Region: Asia-Pacific

Beach Street is a major thoroughfare in George Town within the Malaysian state of Penang. Part of the city's central business district, it is also one of the oldest streets in Penang, having been created soon after the founding of the state by Captain Francis Light in 1786.

The concentration of Malaysian and international banks around Beach Street has made George Town the financial hub within northern Malaysia. In addition, Beach Street is within the UNESCO World Heritage Site, thanks to the colonial architecture of the bank headquarters and other commercial buildings along the street. Administrative buildings built by the British also once stood along Beach Street; however, these buildings were destroyed during World War II.

== Etymology ==
Beach Street was so named as it was once a coastal road, stretching along the eastern shoreline of George Town. Today, the shoreline has been shifted further east due to the land reclamation in the late 19th century; Weld Quay has since become the eastern coastal road in George Town.

== History ==
Plan of Beach Street and side streets, as at December 2006

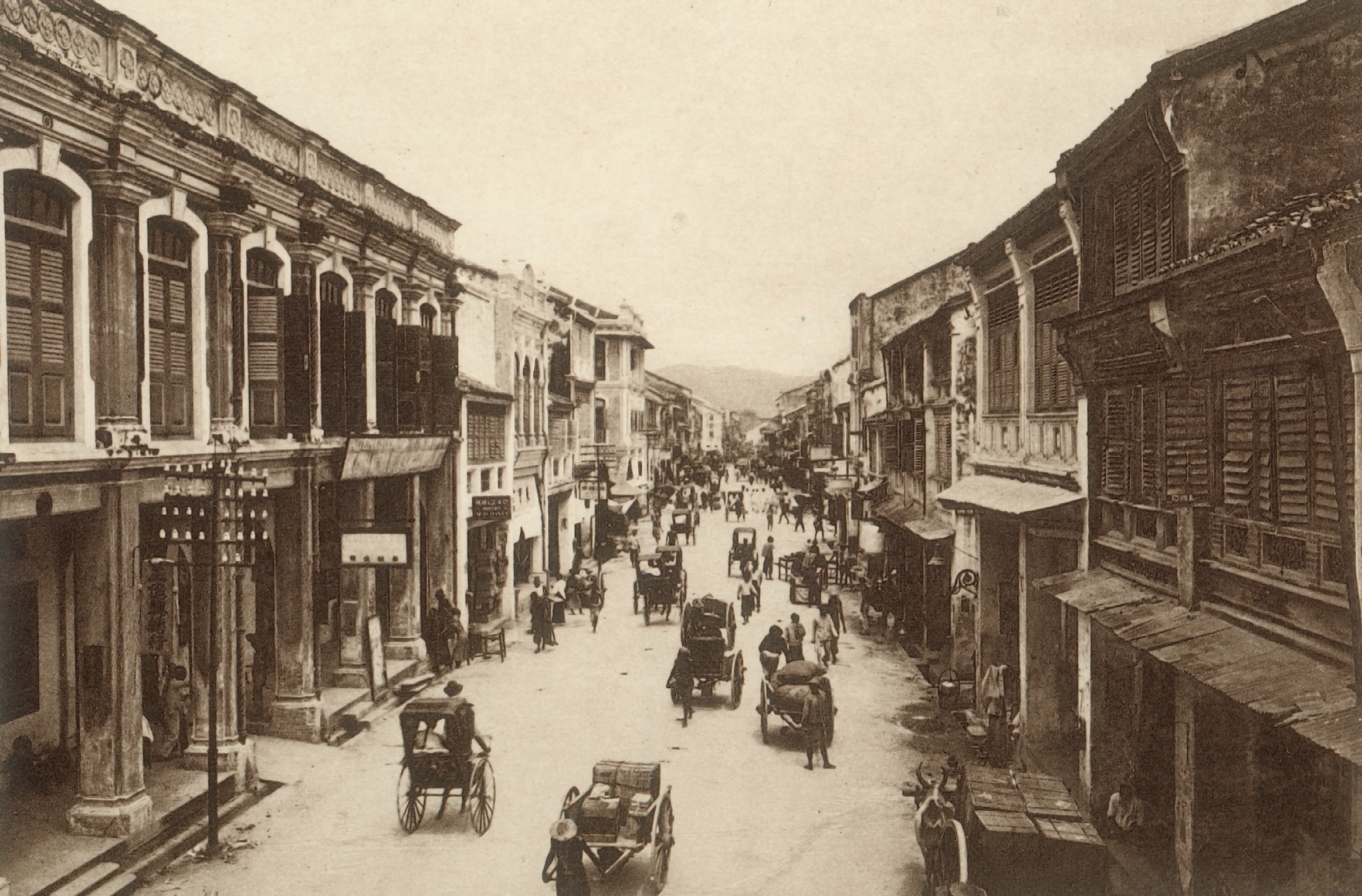
Beach Street in the 1910s

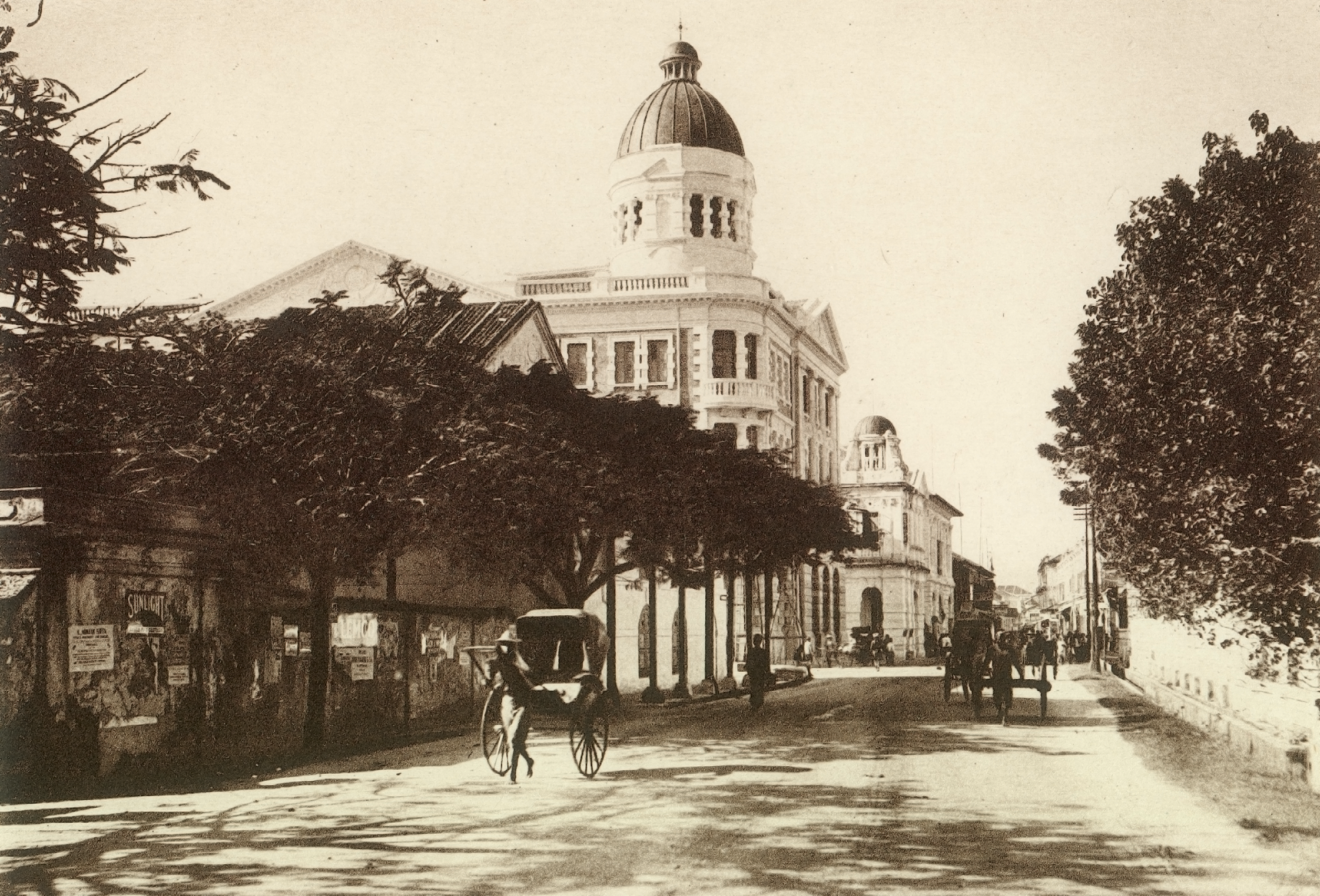
Beach Street in the 1910s. Pictured is the old HSBC building in the foreground (destroyed in World War II), and the then-Netherlands Trading Society building in the background, currently leased by the Bank of China.

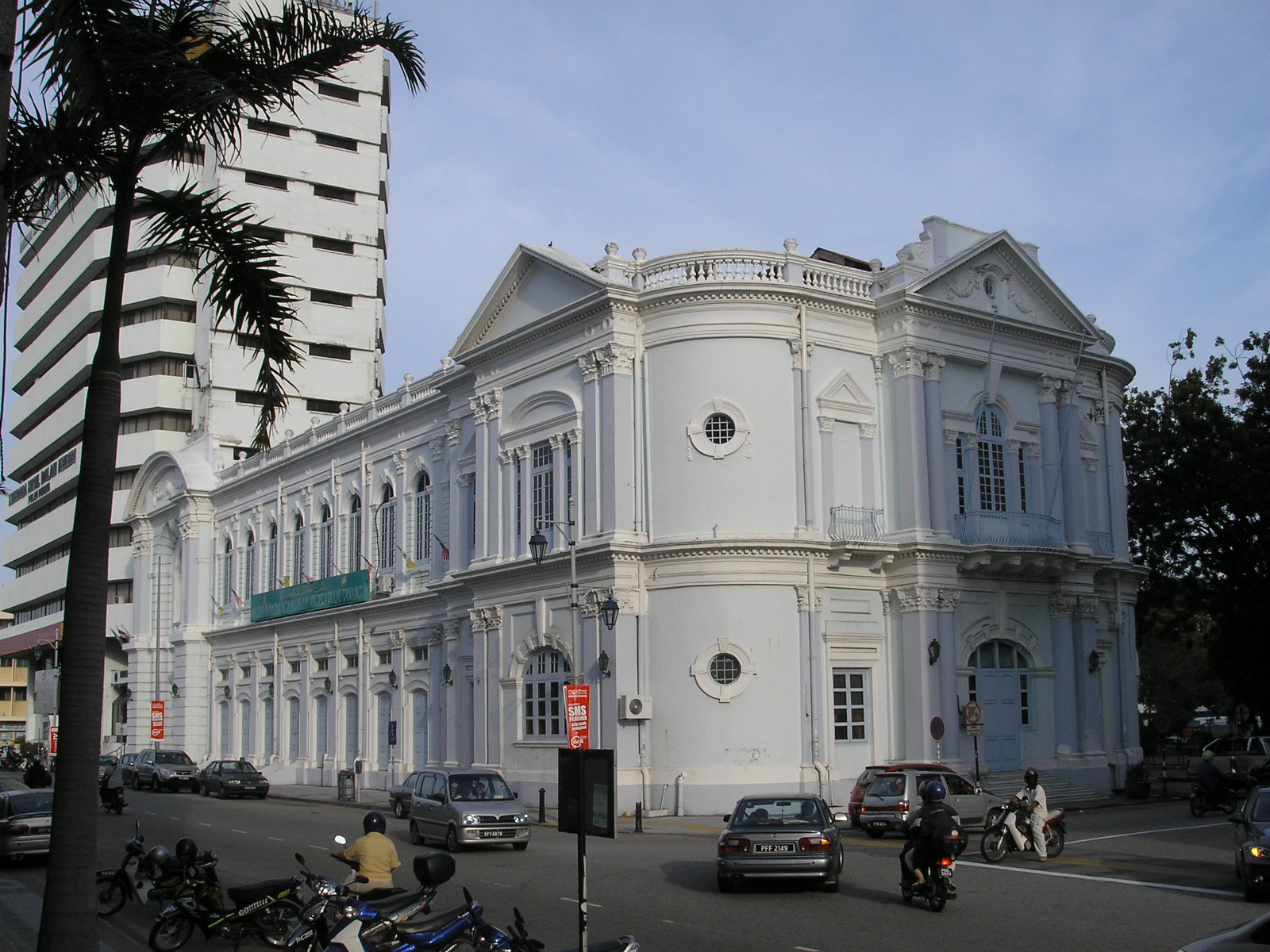
Penang Islamic Department Building

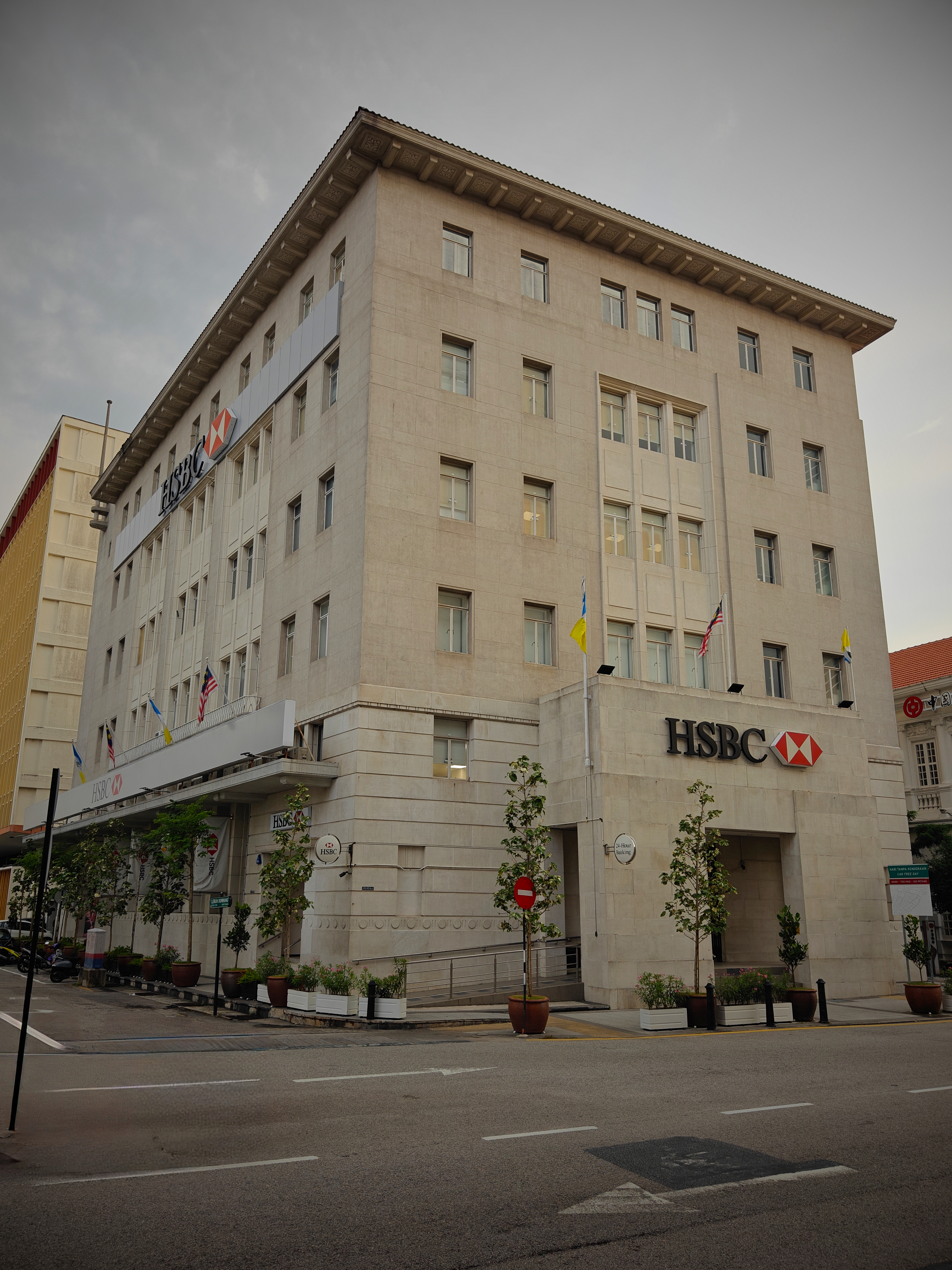
Present-day HSBC Bank Building

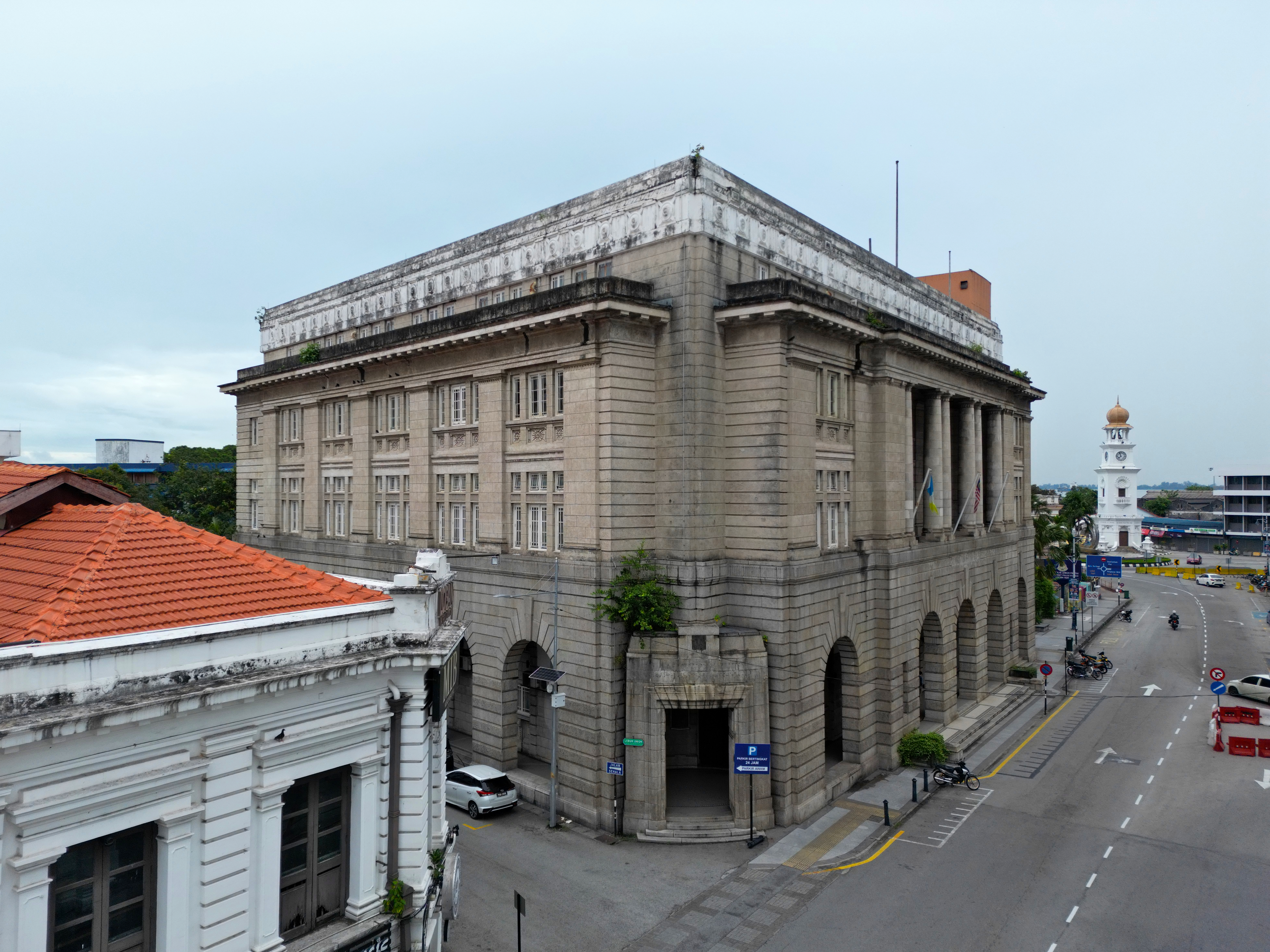
The Standard Chartered Bank building at 2 Beach Street

Beach Street was created between 1786 and 1787, making it one of the oldest roads in Penang, along with the adjoining Light Street. Thus, it has over 200 years of history, predating many cities and towns in Malaysia and Singapore.

Since its creation, Beach Street has always served as the commercial and financial heart of George Town. The Port of Penang was situated at Beach Street at the time, so European traders and merchants were concentrated around the northern end of the road, near the piers and the administrative institutions at Light Street. In its early days, the bulk of the trade came from the visiting British East India Company vessels that were travelling between Britain and China, as well as traders from the region, such as China, India and the Malay archipelago.

In 1875, the Chartered Bank of India, Australia and China (now Standard Chartered) became the first international bank to set up a branch at Beach Street, and by extension, George Town. It was the bank's second branch in British Malaya, after the Singapore branch that had been established in 1859. In the years that followed, several other banks and mercantile firms also set up their branches along Beach Street, such as the Hongkong and Shanghai Banking Corporation (now HSBC), the Netherlands Trading Society and the Oversea-Chinese Bank Limited (now OCBC).

These developments led to a number of improvements in the infrastructure along Beach Street. For example, petroleum-powered lamps were first installed at Beach Street on a trial basis in the 1870s. Street lighting was then gradually installed throughout George Town over the next four decades. In 1894, a short section of Beach Street between Union and Bishop Streets became the first to be tarred.

In order to accommodate more businesses and provide more land for the entrepôt trade, land reclamation was carried out between the 1870s and the 1890s, eventually pushing out George Town's eastern coastline. Since then, Beach Street no longer served as the coastal road, while many mercantile firms relocated to the newly created eastern side of the road, which was closer to the Port of Penang.

At the newly reclaimed eastern side of Beach Street, the Straits Settlements authorities built the U-shaped Government Offices between 1884 and 1909. This extensive complex became the administrative heart of Penang, housing the offices of the Governor of Penang, the Resident Councillor and the Solicitor-General, the Land Office and the Public Works Department, among others. The building was mostly destroyed during World War II; the sole surviving portion of the Government Offices now houses the Penang Islamic Department.

== Landmarks ==
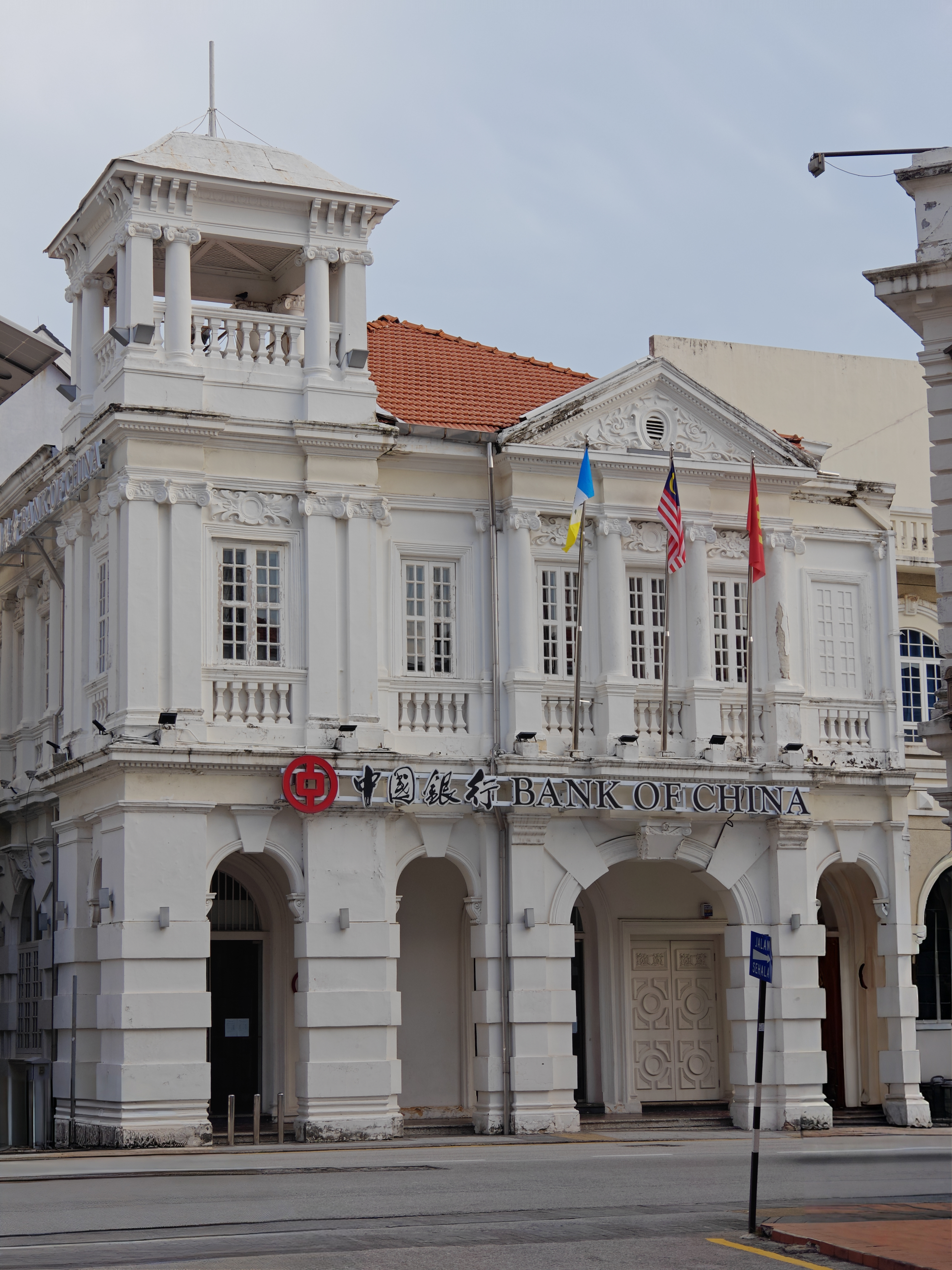
Bank of China Building

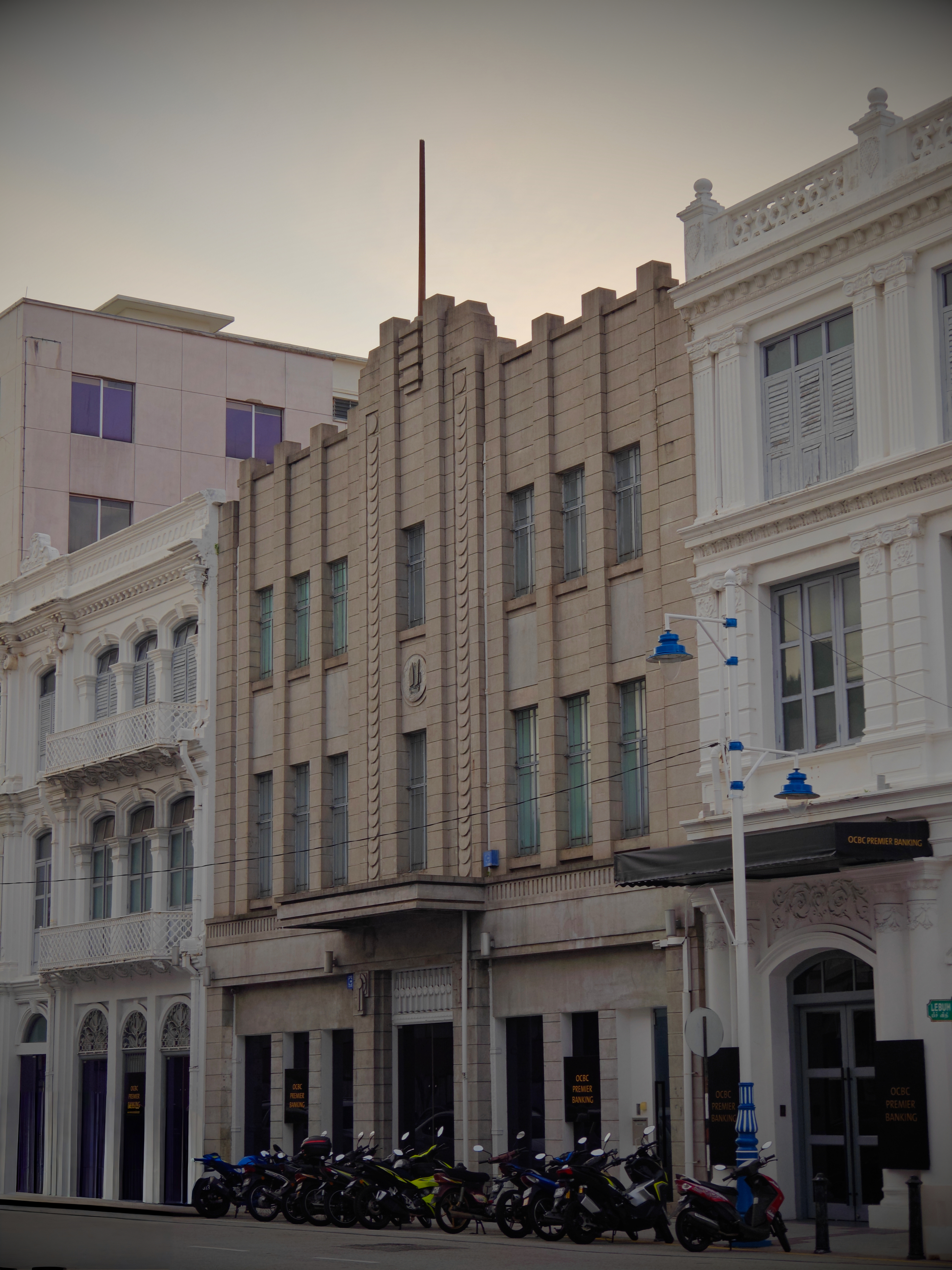
OCBC Building

- Standard Chartered Building, built in a hybrid of Palladian and Art Deco style in 1930
- HSBC Bank Building, rebuilt in the Art Deco style in 1951 after the original building was destroyed during World War II
- Penang Islamic Department Building, formerly part of the Straits Settlements-built Government Offices
- Bank of China Building was completed in the Neoclassical style in 1905
- OCBC Building, built in the Art Deco style in 1938
- 1886 Building, built in the Victorian style
- Logan Building, now a retail and food arcade, was completed in the Victorian style in 1883
- India House, Art Deco, 1937
- George Town Dispensary building, 1923, built by Swan & Maclaren

== See also ==
- List of roads in George Town
- Architecture of Penang
- Little India, Penang
