= Lebuh Aceh Mosque =

Mosque in Northeast, Penang, Malaysia

- Masjid Lebuh Aceh مسجد لبوه اچيه
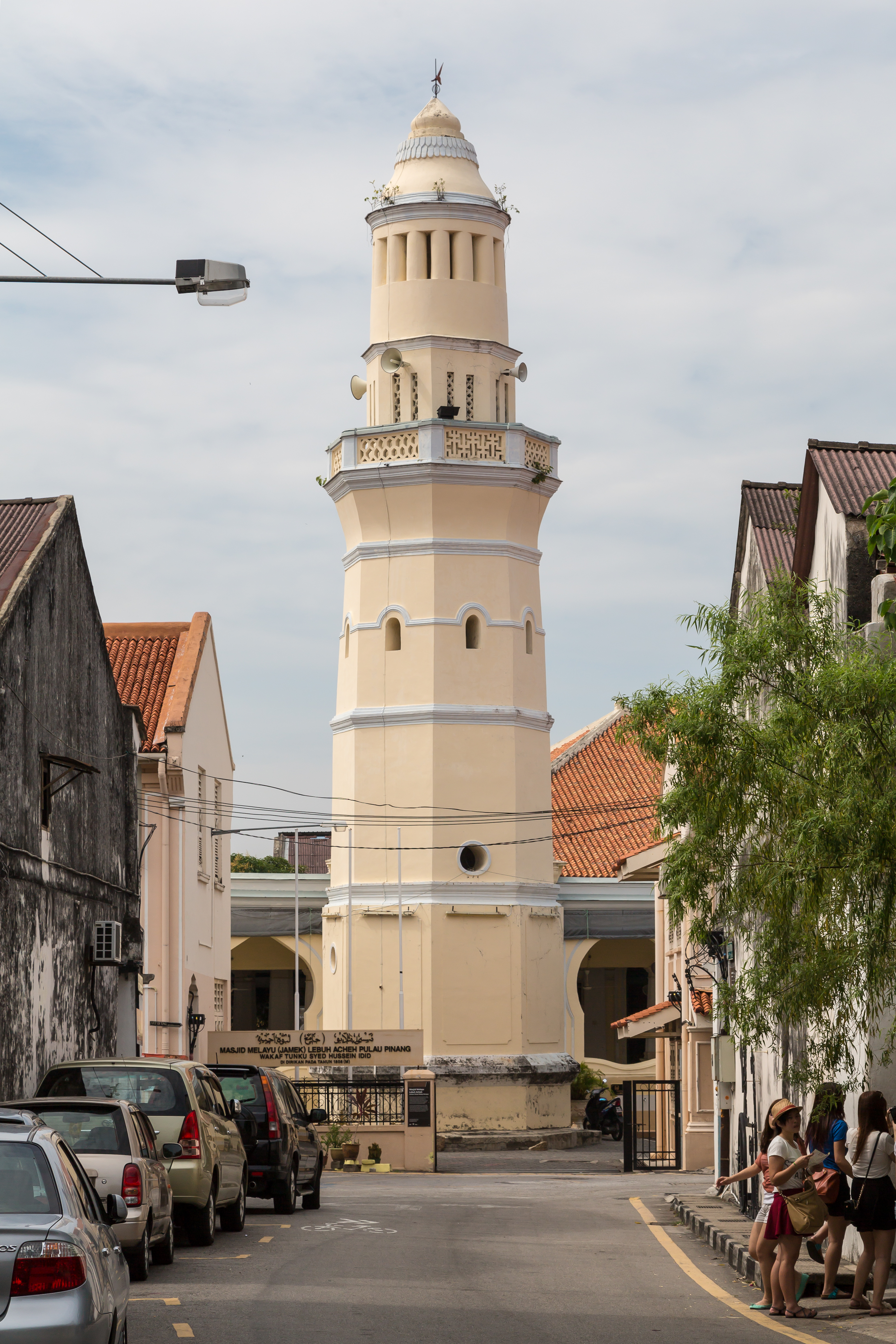

- Location within George Town, Penang

Religion
- Affiliation: Islam
- Branch/tradition: Sunni

Location
- Location: George Town, Penang, Malaysia
- Interactive map of Lebuh Aceh Mosque
- Coordinates: 5°24′52.1″N 100°20′10.3″E

Architecture
- Type: Mosque
- Established: 1808

Lebuh Aceh Mosque (Acheen St Mosque) is a 19th-century mosque built by the Acehnese situated on Acheen Street, George Town, Penang, Malaysia.

Next to the mosque lay the cemetery of the mosque's original benefactor, Tengku Syed Hussain Al-Aidid and members of his family. The houses surrounding the mosque today is part of the original Muslim settlement of the mid 19th century.

Another interesting mosque in Georgetown area that are open to visitors is the Kapitan Keling Mosque.

The Acheen Street Mosque was built in 1808 on land donated by an Achenese aristocrat, Tengku Syed Hussain Al-Aidid. It all began in 1792 when Tengku Syed Hussain opened a Muslim settlement in the area near Lebuh Acheh. Over the following years, this settlement became the centre of Islamic studies in Pulau Pinang, frequented by traders from the surrounding Malay archipelago, Arab and India.

The mosque was built alongside houses, shops and a Madrasah for Quranic Studies. One of the religious figures of the time was Sheikh Omar Basheer Al-Khalilee, who was succeeded by his son Sheikh Zakaria who later was appointed as the first Mufti of Pulau Pinang and in 1888, Sheikh Yahya, his older brother, was appointed as the first Kadi of Pulau Pinang.

Following the demise of Tengku Hussain in mid 19th century, the Lebuh Acheh Muslim settlement continued to thrive and was at one time referred to as the Second Jeddah, as pilgrims from nearby congregate here before departing to Mecca by sea. Each year when the Haj season began, the Lebuh Acheh area was thronged by pilgrims and their families. However, all this ended with the establishment of the Lembaga Tabung Haji in the 1970s.

== See also ==
- Islam in Malaysia
