= Malayan Railway Building =

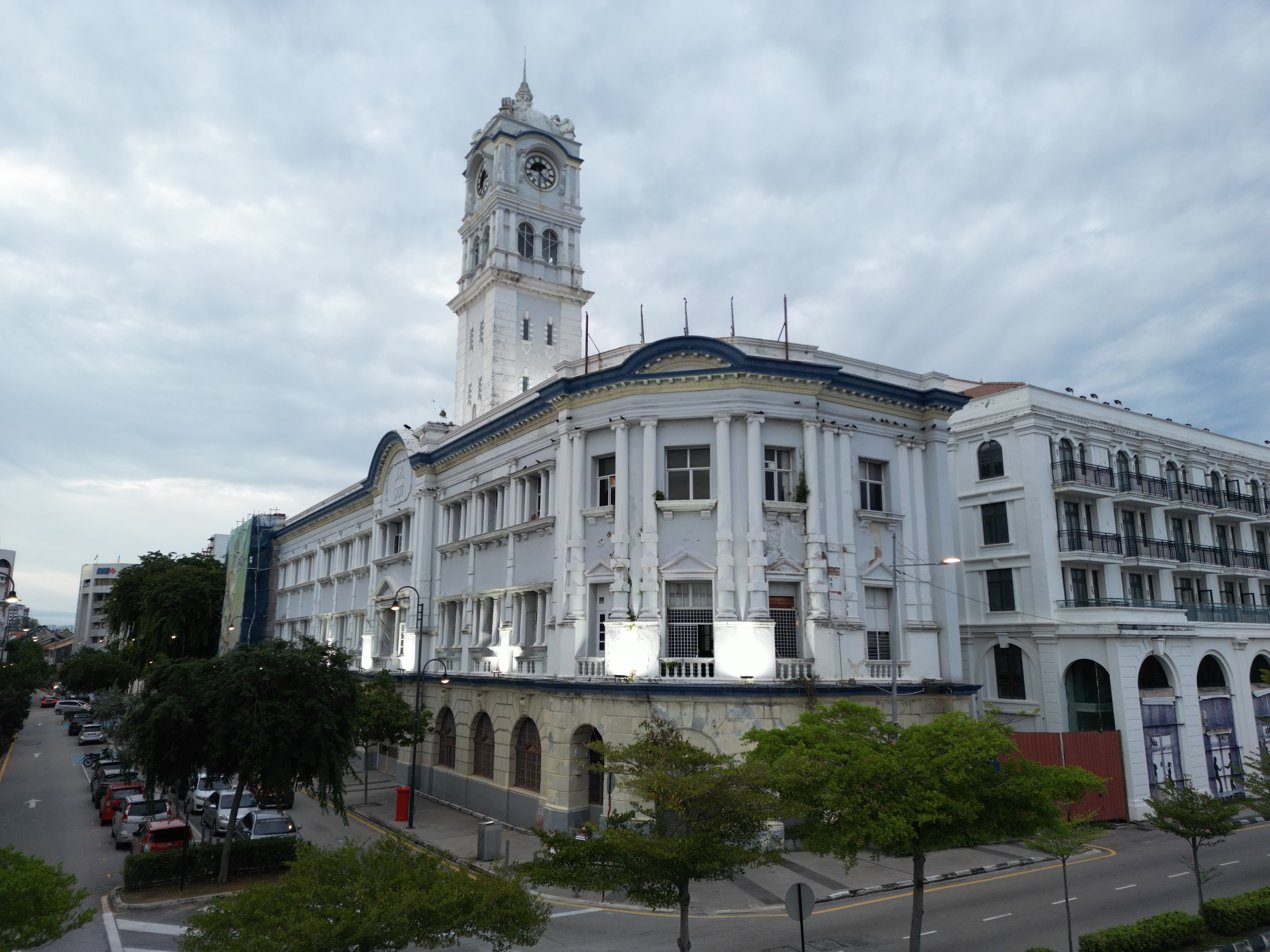
- Interactive map of the Malayan Railway Building area
- Alternative names: Wisma Kastam

General information
- Architectural style: Edwardian Baroque
- Location: China Street Ghaut, 10300 George Town, Penang, Malaysia, George Town, Malaysia
- Coordinates: 5.41542°N 100.34252°E
- Completed: 1909
- Client: Federated Malay States Railways

Design and construction
- Architect: Arthur Benison Hubback

The Malayan Railway Building, previously Wisma Kastam, is a defunct train station in George Town within the Malaysian state of Penang.

== History ==
The Malayan Railway Building and clock tower were designed by English architect Arthur Benison Hubback, Architectural Assistant to the Director of Public Works for the Federated Malay State Railway Department, to serve as it northern railway terminus and was completed in 1909. Lee Ah Kong was appointed contractors and the cost was $166,800 excluding tile and iron work. J. McKenzie acted as supervisor under the direction of H. C. Barnard, Acting Divisional Engineer.

Used as offices for FMS Railway staff, its main purpose was as a ticket office for passengers travelling to Prai railway station on the mainland. The fare included passage on a steamer across the Penang Strait which departed from the Railway Pier situated across the street. Due to the lack of rail lines and trains it was referred to as the "ghost station", and as the only station in Malaysia purpose built without a direct railway connection.

At one time FMS Railway considered using it as a luxury hotel but the plan never went ahead. In the 1960s it was occupied by the Royal Malaysian Customs and Excise Department and became known as "the Customs Building" or Wisma Kastam. The customs department vacated the building in 2022 and an investment company became the new leaseholders. The building has been granted the status of a Grade I heritage building in Malaysia.

== Description ==
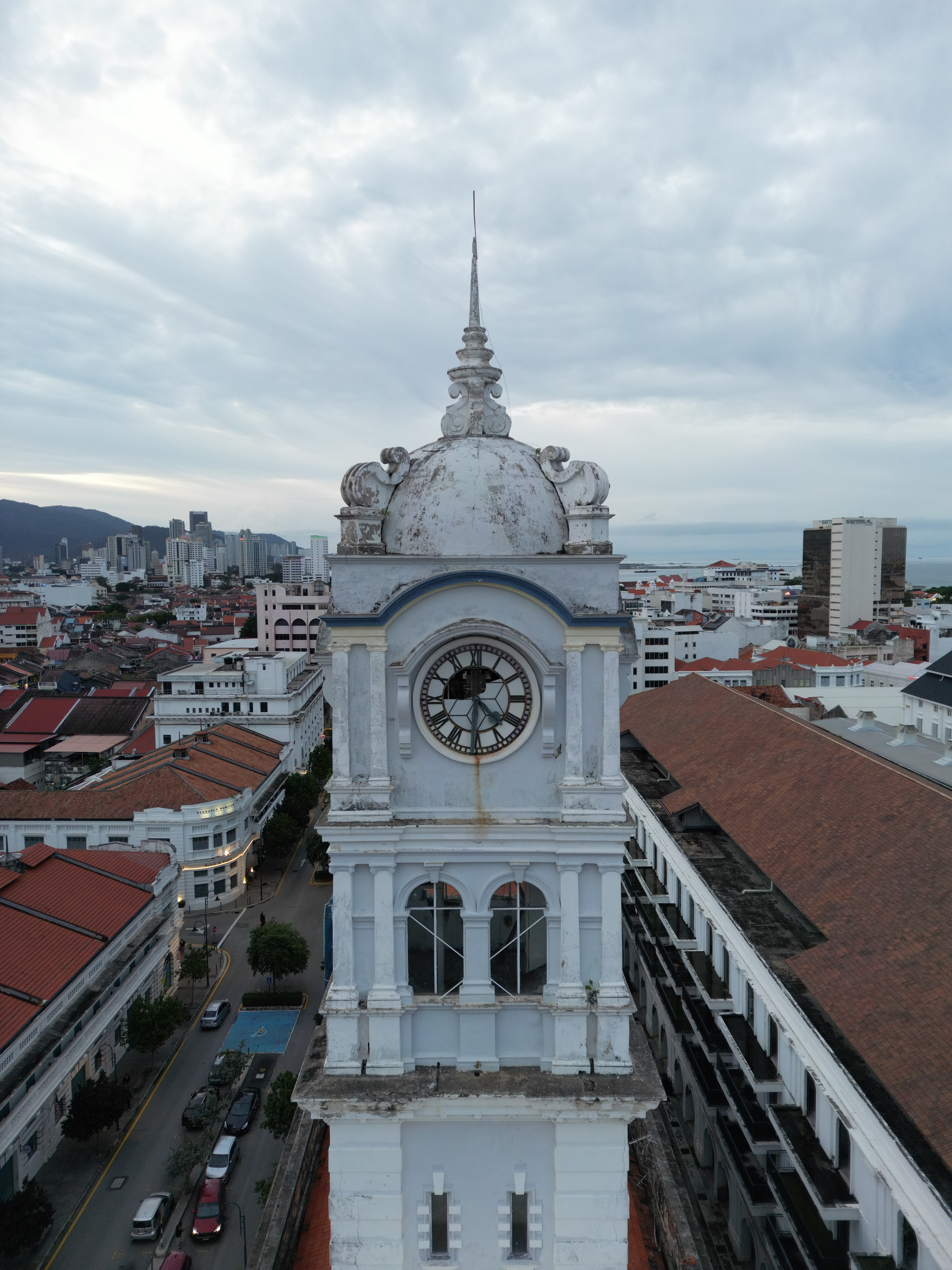
Clock tower on Wisma Kastam at dusk, facing west.

Built in the Edwardian Baroque style to the design of A. B. Hubback, who was responsible for many of the British colonial government buildings of the early twentieth century in British Malaya, it is situated at China Street Ghaut within the city of George Town.

The building, 242 feet long, consists of three storeys including a clock tower which is 150 feet tall and was, until the modern era, one of the tallest buildings in George Town.

The ground floor contains the booking hall decorated with Minton tiles, a bar and restaurant, and offices for the station master, left luggage and telegraph operator. The first floor contains the office of the Traffic Inspector and other offices which were rented out to tenants. The top floor contained more offices and live-in accommodation of the Traffic Inspector. Two lifts were installed and a circular iron staircase was built to give access to the clock tower which has four clock-faces, each eight feet in diameter, and a large, two ton bell which tolled the hours.
