= Foo Tye Sin Mansion =

Mansion in George Town, Penang, Malaysia

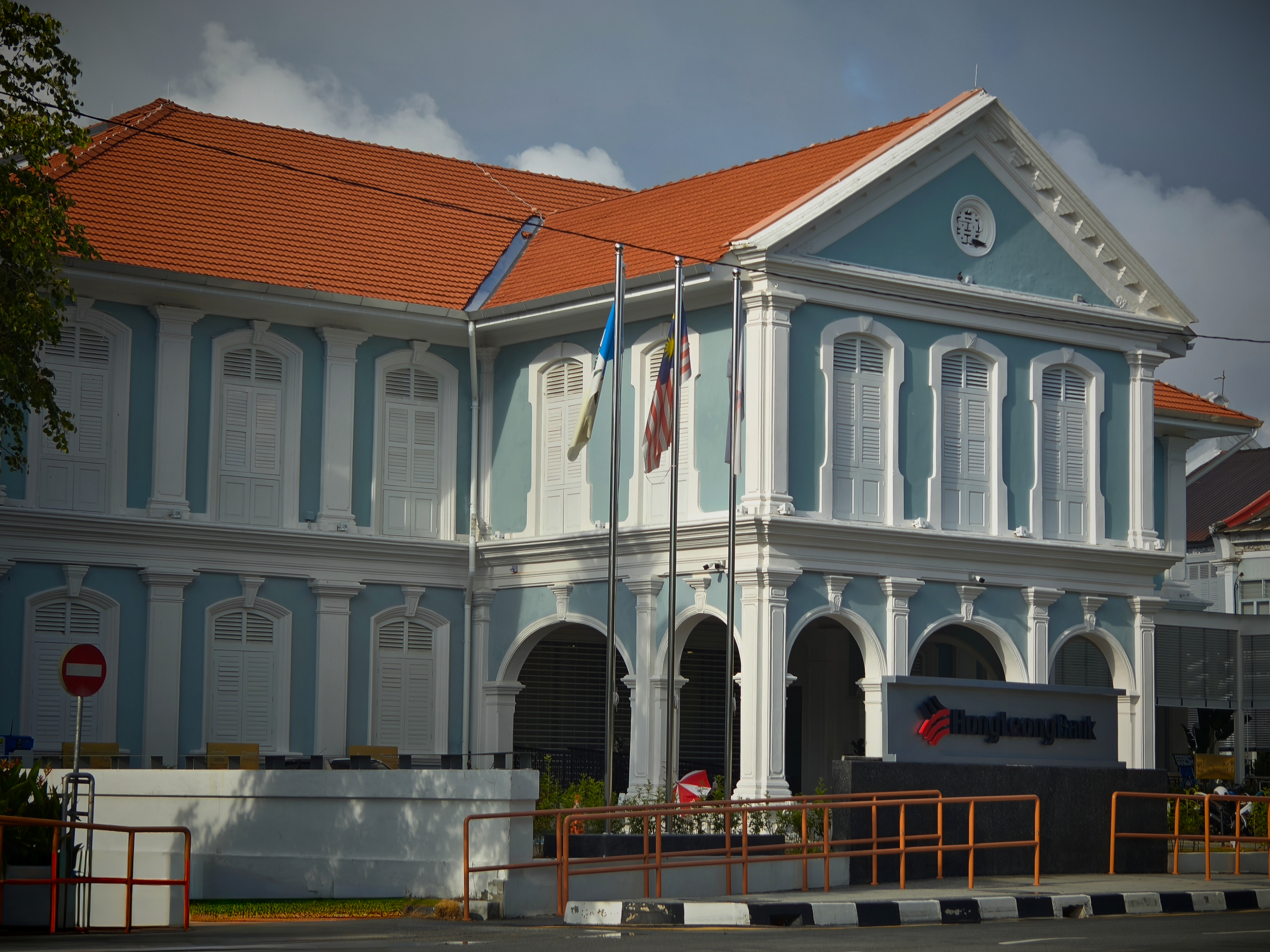
- Interactive map of the Foo Tye Sin Mansion area

General information
- Location: 1 Light Street, George Town, Penang, Malaysia, George Town, Malaysia
- Coordinates: 5.41973°N 100.3421°E
- Current tenants: Hong Leong Bank
- Completed: 1875
- Owner: Hong Leong Bank

Technical details
- Floor area: 20,594 sq ft (1,913.2 m^{2})

The Foo Tye Sin Mansion is a mansion in George Town within the Malaysian state of Penang. Built in 1875, the building is situated at Light Street within the city's Central Business District. It was originally the residence of Chinese tycoon Foo Tye Sin. In 1986, the building was acquired by MUI Group, and it currently serves as a branch of Hong Leong Bank.

== History ==
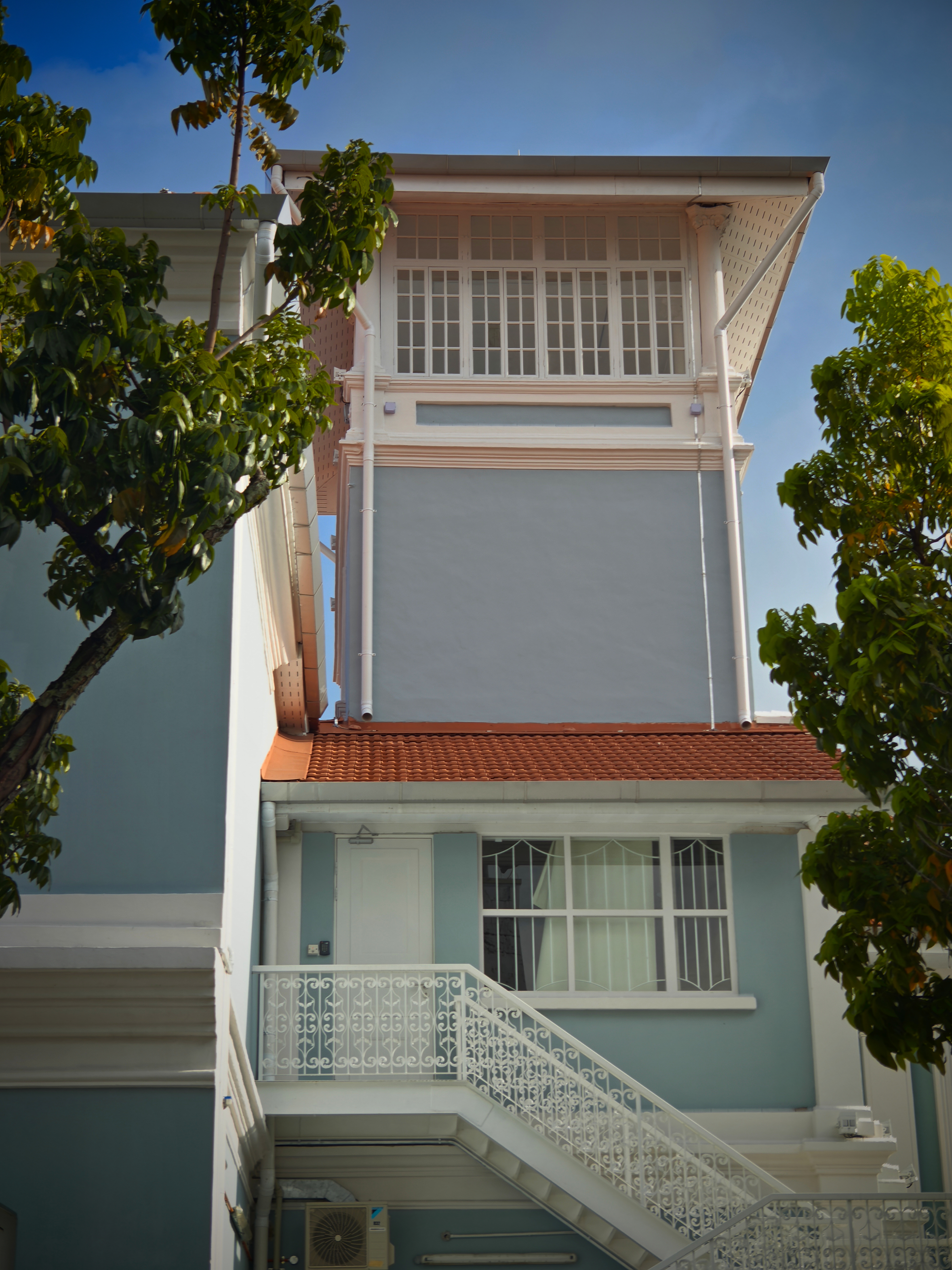
A four-storey lookout tower at the back of the mansion.

By the late 19th century, Light Street served as the administrative centre of Penang and was characterised by its distinct European influence. The Foo Tye Sin Mansion, completed in 1875, was one of the first non-European mansions built along the street.

The residence was erected for Foo Tye Sin, a local Chinese tycoon who contributed as a community leader during the official inquiry into the 1867 Penang riots. In recognition of his service, British administrators named a street after him.

The building was acquired by MUI Group in 1986 and subsequently became a branch of MUI Bank. In 1994, ownership was transferred to Hong Leong Bank following its acquisition of MUI Bank. A budget of RM2 million was allocated for the restoration of the building, which was completed by 2010. Further renovations took place between 2022 and 2024, during which the building's façade was painted light blue.

== See also ==
- Cheong Fatt Tze Mansion
- Homestead
- Pinang Peranakan Mansion
- Suffolk House
- Woodville
