= Statue of Yeap Chor Ee =

Statue in Penang, Malaysia

Coordinates: 5°25′37″N 100°19′26″E

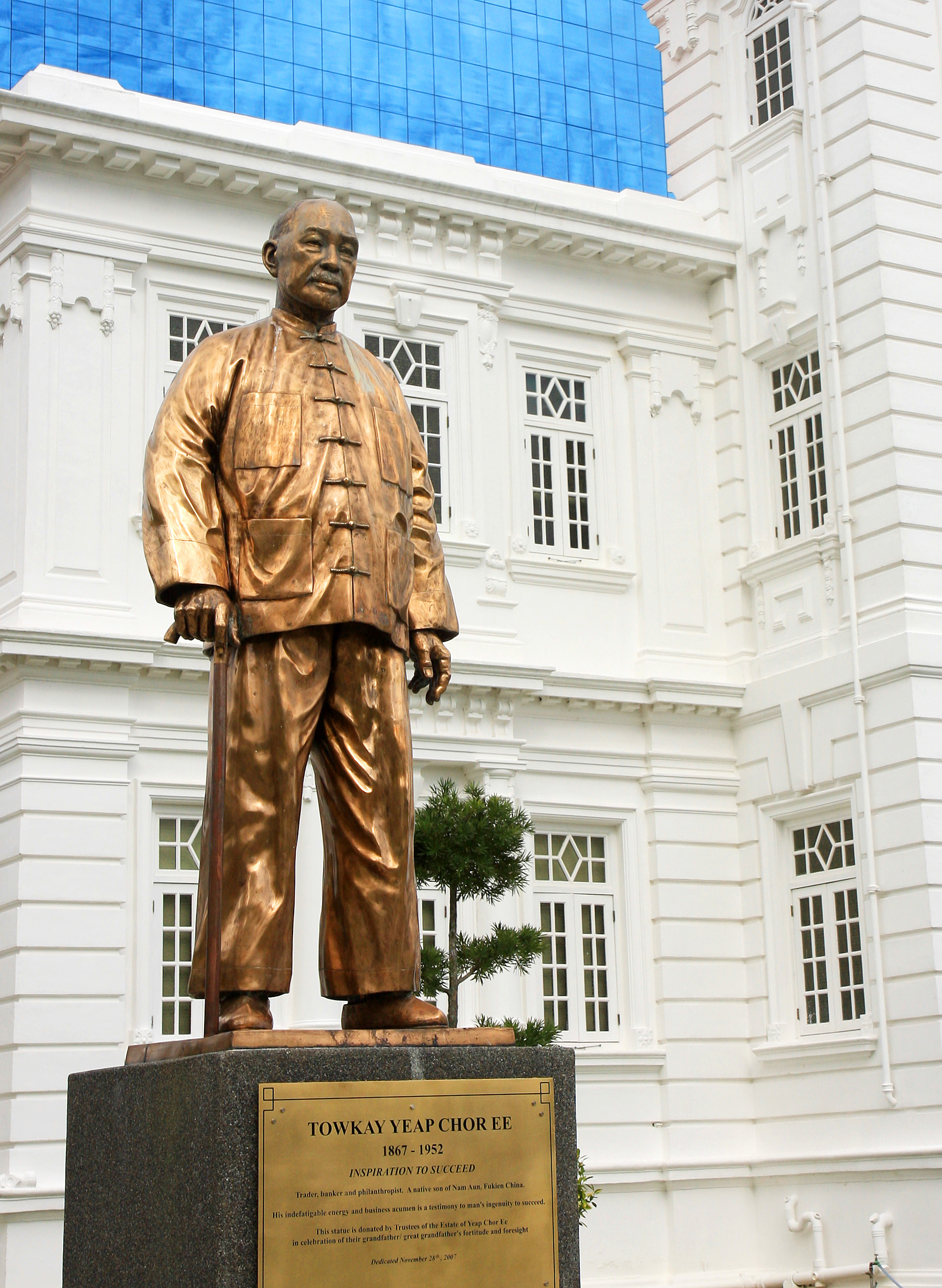
Statue of Yeap Chor Ee

The Yeap Chor Ee statue is a memorial to the towkay (businessman) Yeap Chor Ee (1867–1952). It is situated in front of his former residence named 'Homestead', now part of the main campus of Wawasan Open University, at Northam Road in George Town, Penang, Malaysia.

== Background ==
Yeap Chor Ee was a migrant from Fujian, China who, after arriving almost penniless in Penang in the 1880s, went on to create a successful business empire, becoming the wealthiest man in Penang and one of the richest men in Asia. During his lifetime he was famous for his philanthropic work, and in later life became known as "the Grand Old Man of Penang".

The copper statue is 2.5 metres tall, and was unveiled by his grandson, Dato' Seri Stephen Yeap Leong Huat, Chairman of the Wawasan Education Foundation, at a ceremony held on 28 November 2007.

On the memorial plaque the following words are inscribed:

Towkay Yeap Chor Ee. 1867–1952. Inspiration to Succeed. Trader, banker and philanthropist. A native son of Nam Aun, Fukien, China. This statue is donated by Trustees of the Estate of Yeap Chor Ee in celebration of their grandfather/great-father's fortitude and foresight. Dedicated November 28th, 2007.
