= Old Protestant Cemetery =

Old Protestant Cemetery may refer to:

- Old Protestant Cemetery in Macau
- Old Protestant Cemetery, George Town, Malaysia
