= Penang Natural History Museum =

Defunct museum in Penang, Malaya

The Penang Natural History Museum was a museum located in George Town, Penang, Federation of Malaya. The museum was opened in 1954 at Northam Road and closed in 1955.

== History ==
After World War II, a proposal for a museum in Penang was made to James Angus Gillan, head of the Empire Division of the British Council while meeting the representatives of the Penang Library on 16 November 1946. On 6 October 1953, Robert Porter Bingham, the Resident Commissioner of Penang applied for funds to set up a museum dedicated to Penang's history. On 8 March 1954, Gerald Templer, the British High Commissioner for Malaya wrote a letter to The Times to appeal for exhibits and financial support for museums in Malaya, including the future museum in Penang. The residents of Penang and Province Wellesley at the time were in favour of the museum's establishment.

Through the assistance of J. N. Davies, the Chief Education Officer of Penang, the museum was able to occupy a building temporarily at 23, Northam Road, owned by the Education Department. The Natural History Museum was then opened around mid-1954, with J. D. Lewis being appointed honorary secretary and treasurer of the museum. By September the museum had already received over 20,000 visitors, and its operating time was adjusted to open daily until 6 p.m. and until 4 p.m. on Saturdays. Public meetings were called on 22 and 23 October to decide on the fate of the museum. The outcome of the meeting was that the museum got to stay at its temporary location despite lacking money and rooms. D. W. Le Mare was elected chairman, with J. D. Lewis as secretary and treasurer. Other members of the committee were: S. M. Hussain, J. Cairn, Lim Gim Boon, W. J. K. Mandy and M. J. V. Miller. On the same month the Penang Municipal Council decided to contribute 1,000 Malaya and British Borneo dollars to the museum.

The museum was supposed to close by 31 December 1954 as it was asked to vacate its building, but it was still able to continue operation the next year. The museum finally closed at the end of 1955, to public dismay. Most of the museum's exhibits were moved to St. George's Girls School as its former site was demolished to build a new school. The museum was seeking for a new home and donations during that period.

During the Settlement Council meeting on 1 September 1956, a query regarding the museum's possibility of reestablishment and whereabouts of its exhibits were given by Aziz Ibrahim, a Gelugor member. In 1964, the pro tem committee of the Penang State Museum stated that it was unable to find any exhibits of the Natural History Museum.

== Exhibits ==
There were various exhibits acquired by the museum and given or loaned by the public. Some of the museum's exhibited items included:

=== Specimens ===
- Mounted specimens of birds and animal heads.
- Collections of butterflies, bird's eggs and tropical fish.
- A large glass case filled with small birds, donated by the staff of the Anglo-Chinese Girls' School.
- A sea snake caught at Batu Ferringhi, presented by Lim Swee Lim, a taxidermist.
- A giant coconut palm from Bali, loaned by the Seng Wah Pet shop.
- A collection of land and river snakes and lizards, donated by Lim Cheng Huat, a St. Xavier's student.

=== Objects ===
- A booklet published in Kenya in 1945, which assisted in raising a fund of over $60.000 for prisoners of war that were in Japanese hands.
- A century-old Chinese sword, presented by a Pulau Tikus resident, Mrs. Jambu.
- A 50 years old wooden model of a Chinese pagoda made in Fuzhou, presented by Wu Lien-teh.
- The Italian flag which once flew over the governor-general's residence at Addis Abbaba, capital of Ethiopia.
