= Homestead, Penang =

Coordinates: 5°25′37″N 100°19′27″E

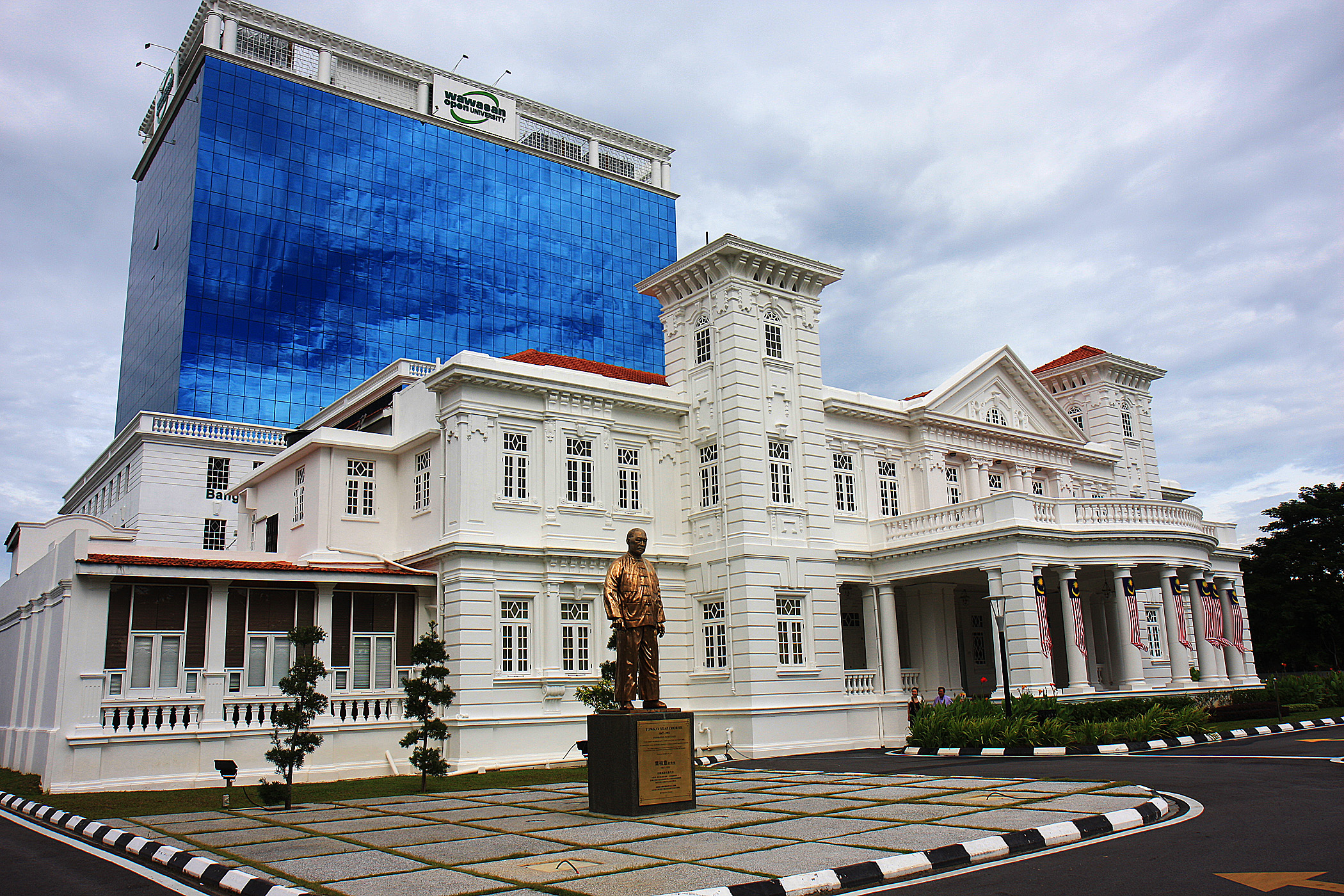

General information
- Architectural style: Palladian
- Location: 54 Northam Road
- Town or city: George Town, Penang
- Country: Malaysia
- Completed: 1919
- Client: Lim Chin Guan

Design and construction
- Architect(s): Stark and McNeill

Homestead is a mansion in George Town within the Malaysian state of Penang.

== History ==
The building, situated at No. 54 Northam Road (Jalan Sultan Ahmad Shah), George Town, was built in 1919 by Lim Chin Guan for his father, comprador, Lim Mah Chye until his death in 1927. Lim Chin Guan is said to have chosen the site to block the sea-view of his life-long business rival Quah Beng Kee who lived nearby. It was designed by architect James Stark of Stark & McNeill.

During the 1940s the building was acquired by wealthy businessman and philanthropist, Yeap Chor Ee, whose statue stands outside, and when he died in 1952 it continued to be used for over 50 years as a residence by his descendants. In 2006, his grandson, together with the trustees of his estate, donated it to Wawasan Open University and it became part of its campus together with a twelve storey administrative building erected behind it.

== Architecture ==
The neo-classical design of the building's front facade, which includes a colonnade and pediment between two towers, is said to be based on the sixteenth century Italian Valmarara built in northern Italy by Andrea Palladio. The sea-facing facade features a Chinese geomantic device on the tympanum of the pediment.

== See also ==
- Foo Tye Sin Mansion
- Woodville
