= Woodville, Penang =

Mansion in George Town, Penang, Malaysia

Woodville
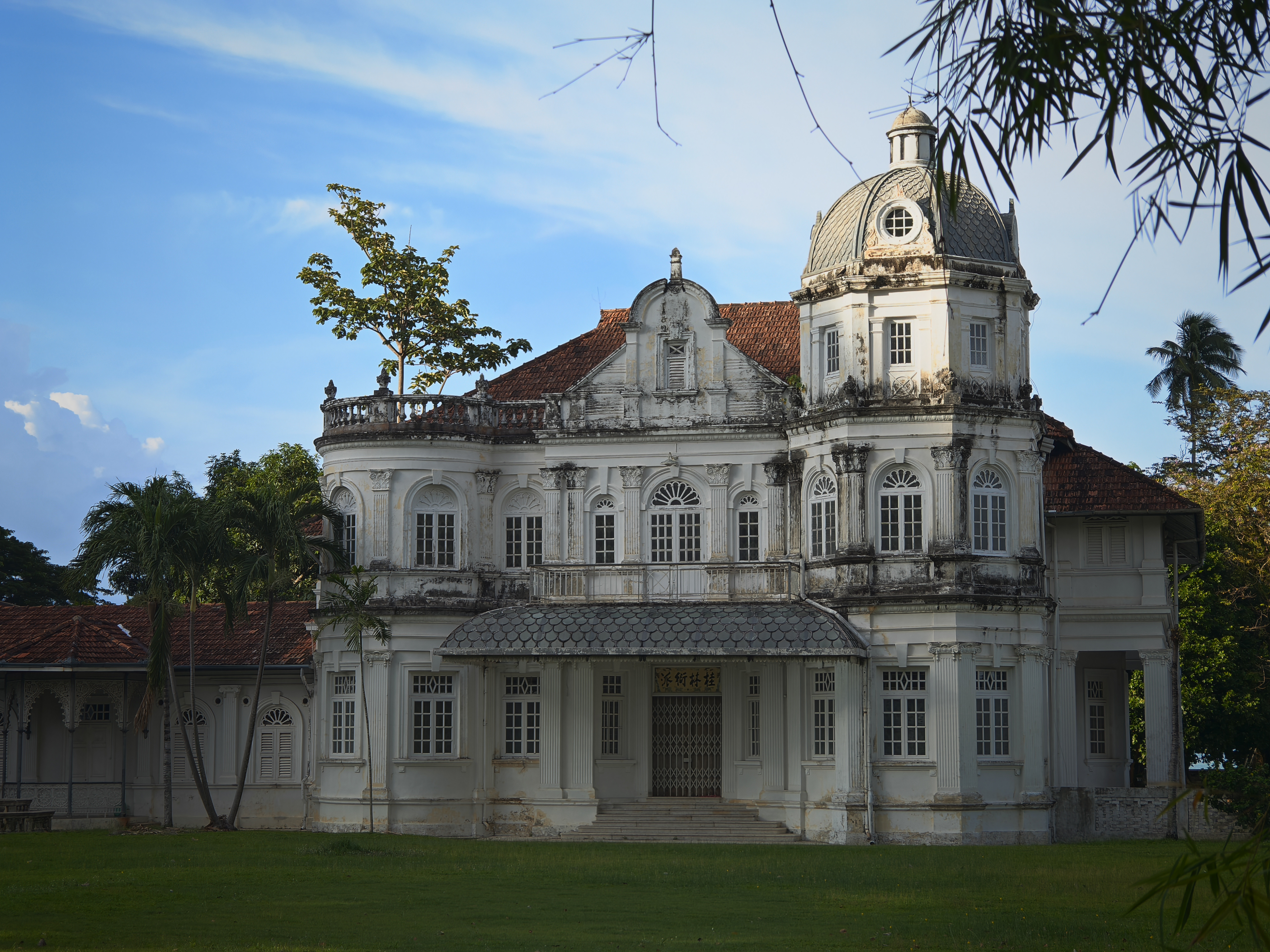
- Interactive map of the Woodville area
- Alternative names: Lim Lean Teng Mansion

General information
- Location: Northam Road, George Town, Penang, Malaysia, George Town, Malaysia
- Coordinates: 5.42801°N 100.322°E
- Completed: 1925

Design and construction
- Architect: Joseph Charles Miller

Woodville is a mansion in George Town within the Malaysian state of Penang. Built in 1925, the building is situated at Northam Road within the city's Central Business District. It was originally the residence of Chinese tycoon Lim Lean Teng. The building is distinguishable from other mansions along the road due to the addition of a dome with a cupola, hastily designed by British architect Joseph Charles Miller.

== History ==
The mansion was designed by architect Joseph Charles Miller in 1925. Commissioned by Chinese businessman Lim Lean Teng, the building incorporates a canopy clas in oyster glass and a dome – features that had been inspired by the original HSBC Building at Beach Street. Lim believed that these features would set his mansion apart from others along Northam Road, which was commonly referred to as the "Millionaire's Row" at the time. Resembling a French château, the mansion is an example of Miller's "castle mansion" design, which blends classical and modern architectural elements.

== See also ==
- Cheong Fatt Tze Mansion
- Foo Tye Sin Mansion
- Homestead
- Macalister Mansion
- Pinang Peranakan Mansion
- Suffolk House
