= BHL Tower =

Commercial skyscraper in George Town, Penang, Malaysia

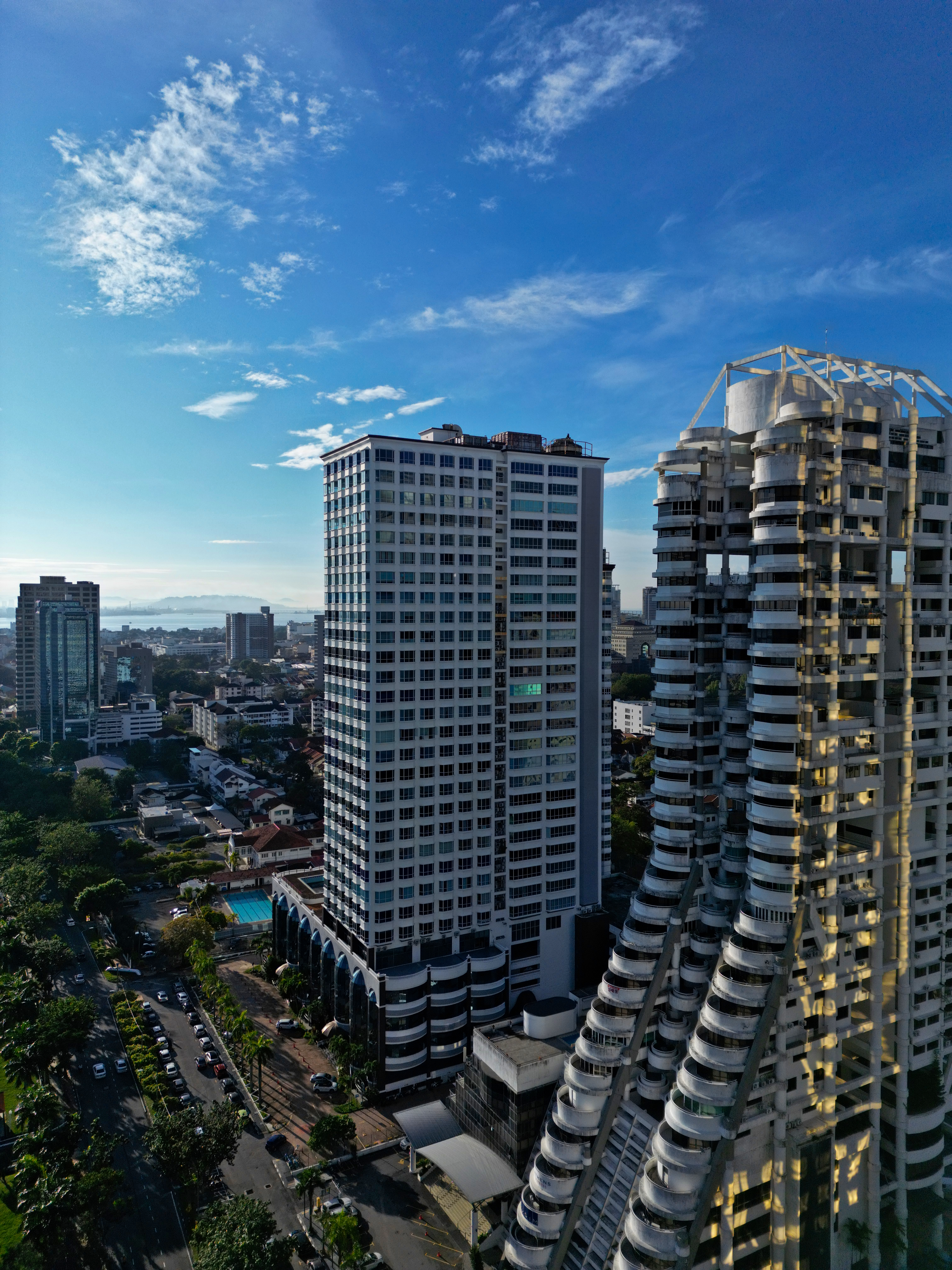
- Interactive map of the BHL Tower area

General information
- Type: Commercial offices
- Location: Northam Road, 10050 George Town, Penang, Malaysia, George Town, Penang, Malaysia
- Coordinates: 5.426392°N 100.322559°E
- Completed: 1995

Height
- Roof: 108 m (354 ft)
- Top floor: 30

Technical details
- Floor count: 30
Consulate General of Japan, Penang
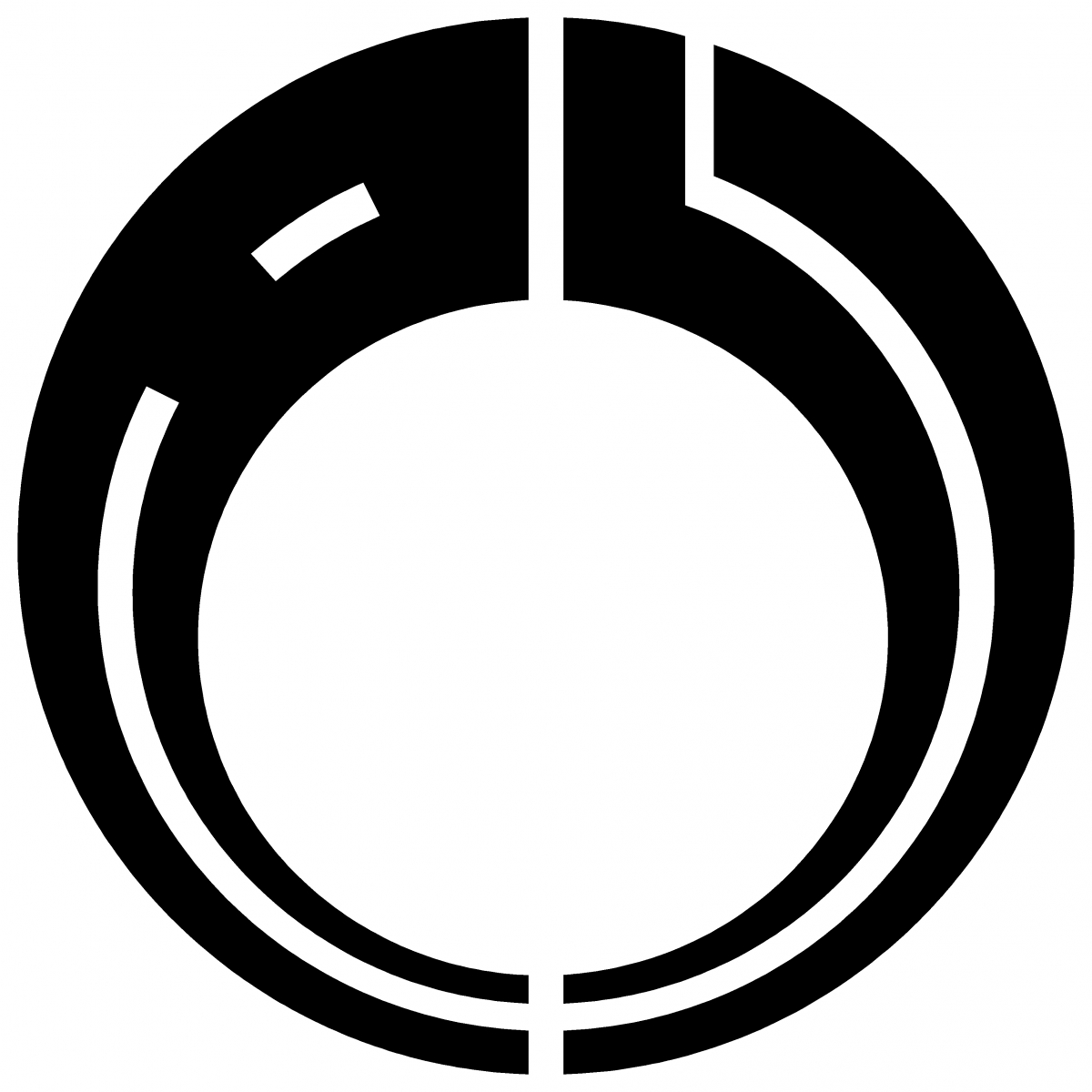
- Seal of the Japanese Ministry of Foreign Affairs
- Incumbent; Kiyoshi Itoi
- Website: penang.my.emb-japan.go.jp/itprtop_en/index.html

BHL Tower is a commercial skyscraper within George Town in the Malaysian state of Penang. Located at Northam Road within the city's Central Business District (CBD), the 30-storey building was completed in 1995 and stands at a height of 108 m (354 ft).

Aside from hosting a branch of CIMB Bank, BHL Tower also houses the Consulate-General of Japan in Penang.

== History ==
BHL Tower, completed in 1995, is one of the oldest skyscrapers along Northam Road after the nearby MBf Tower. It originally served as the regional office of BHL Bank, which was later merged with other banks to form its successor, CIMB. To this day, CIMB maintains a branch within the structure.

== See also ==
- List of tallest buildings in George Town
- Northam Road
