= George Town Central Business District, Penang =

Central business district of George Town in Penang, Malaysia

George Town Central Business District
- Central business district

Other transcription(s)
  - Malay: Koridor George Town–Pulau Tikus (Rumi)
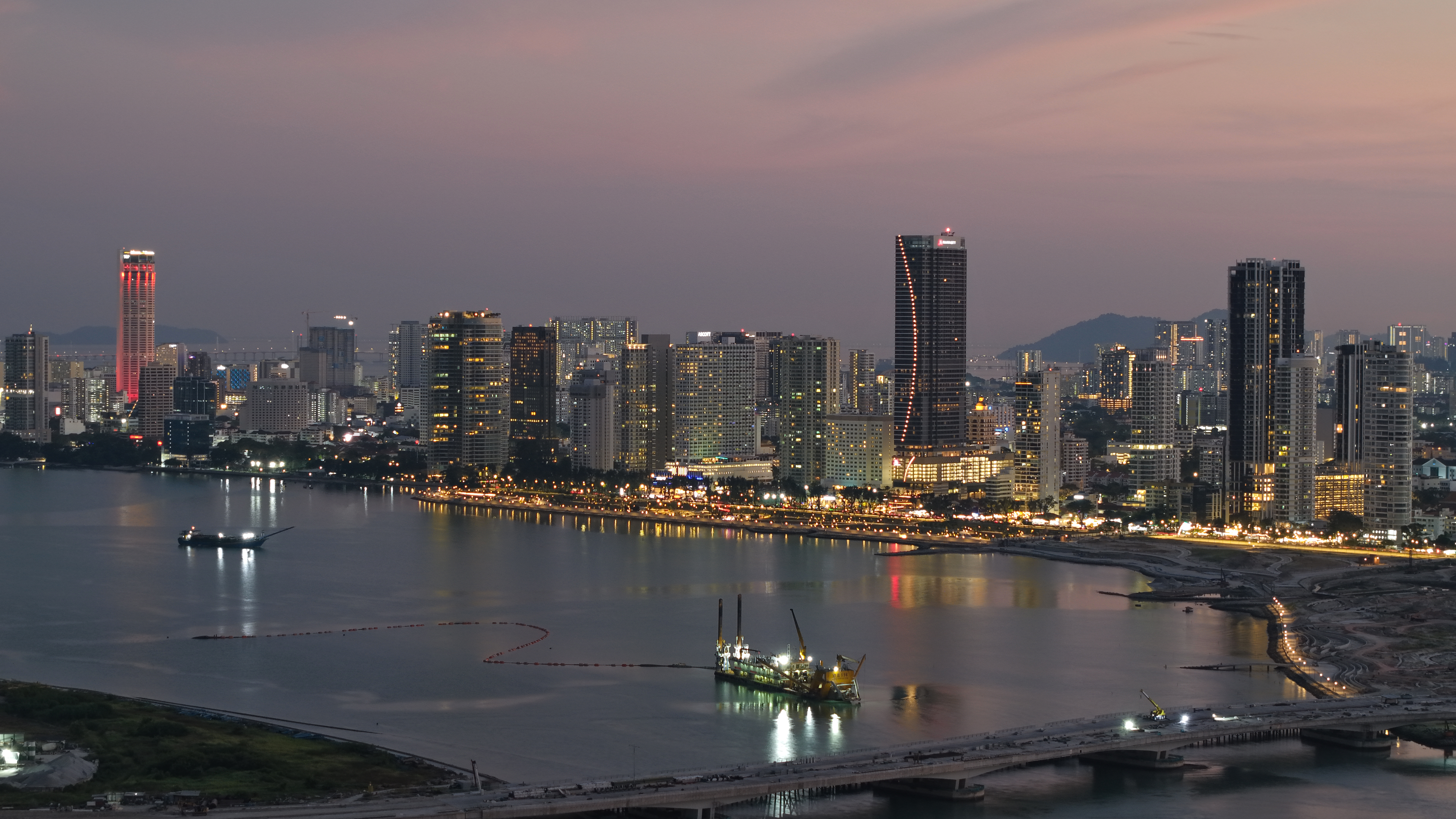
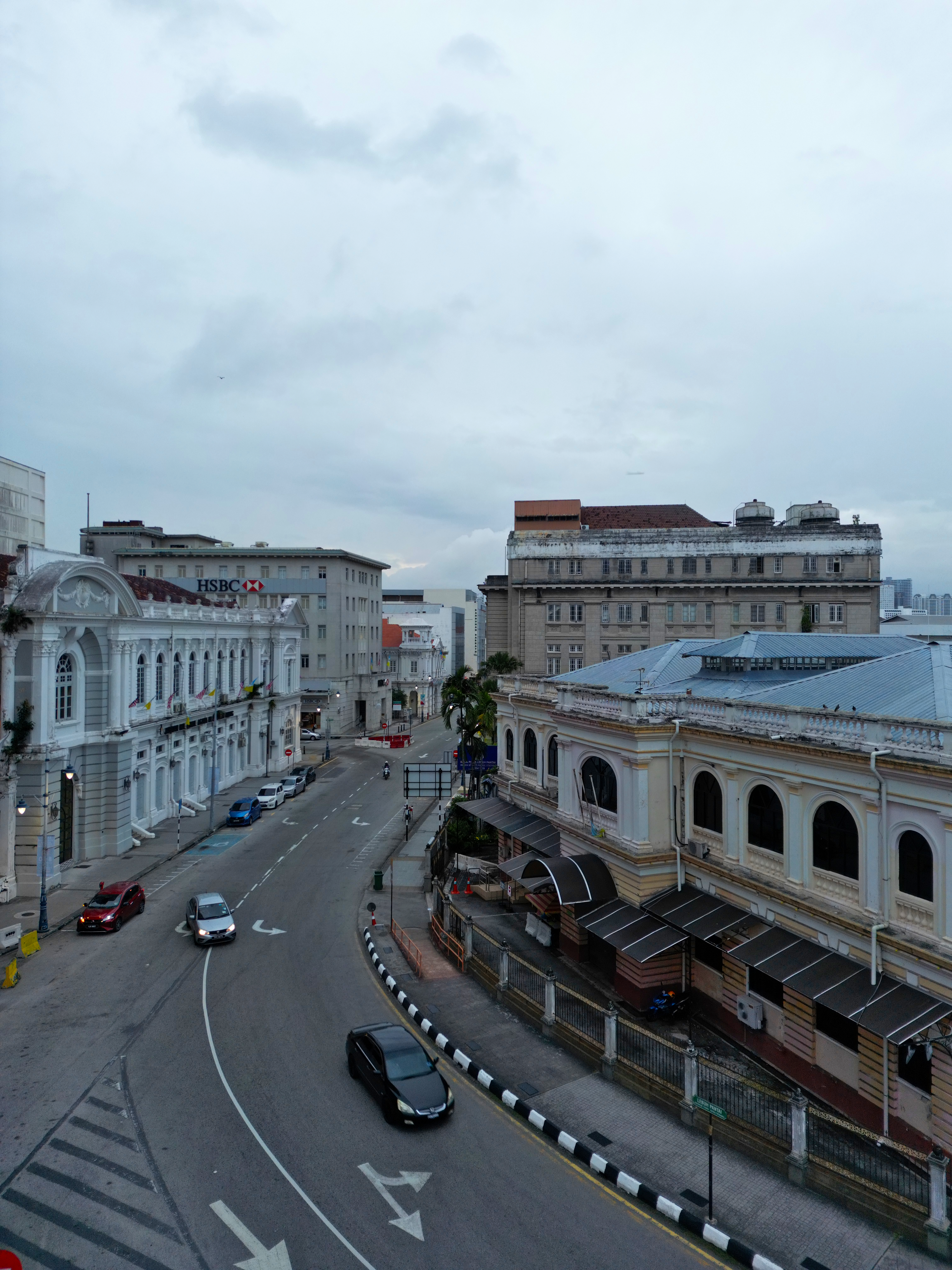
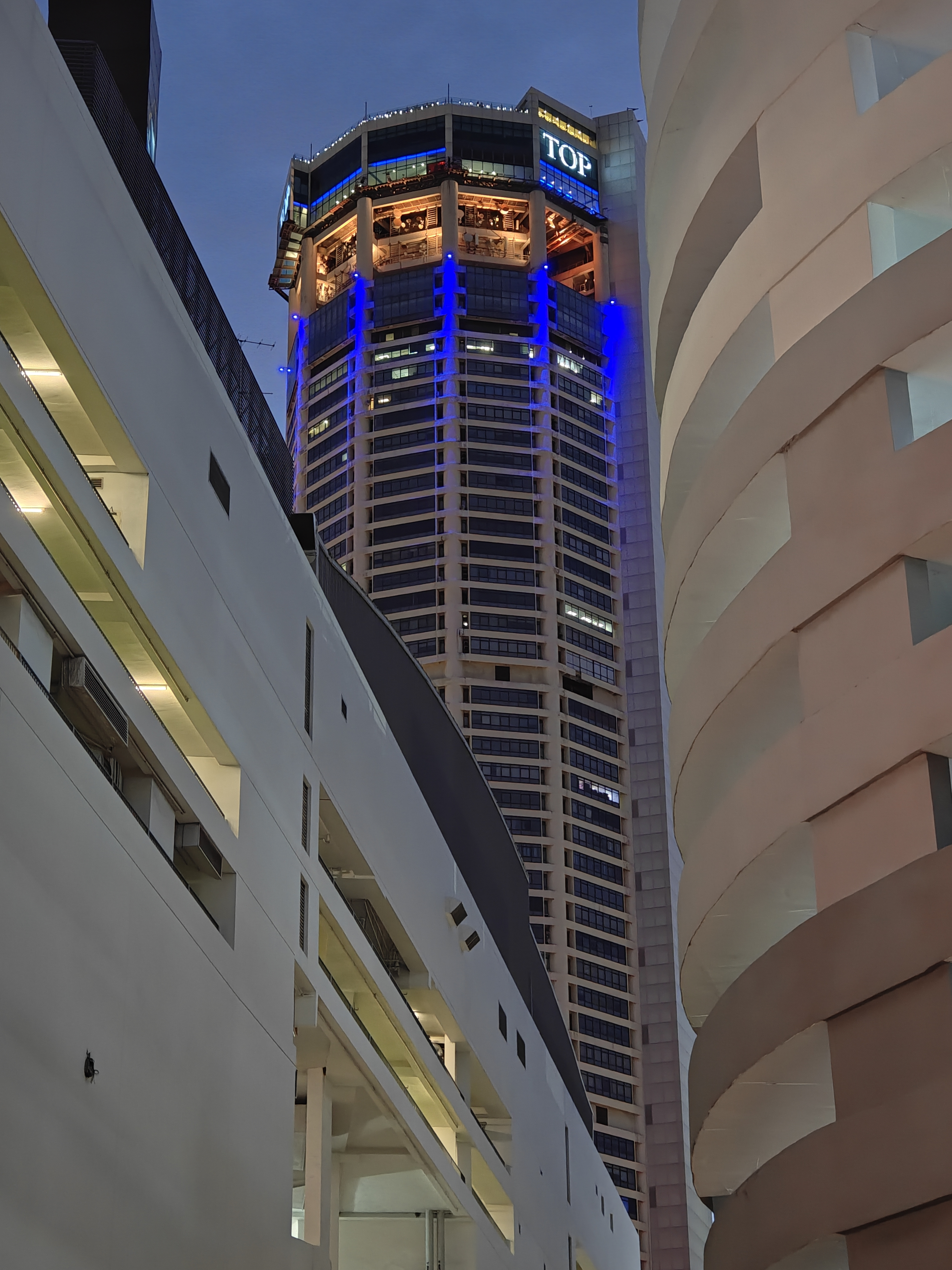
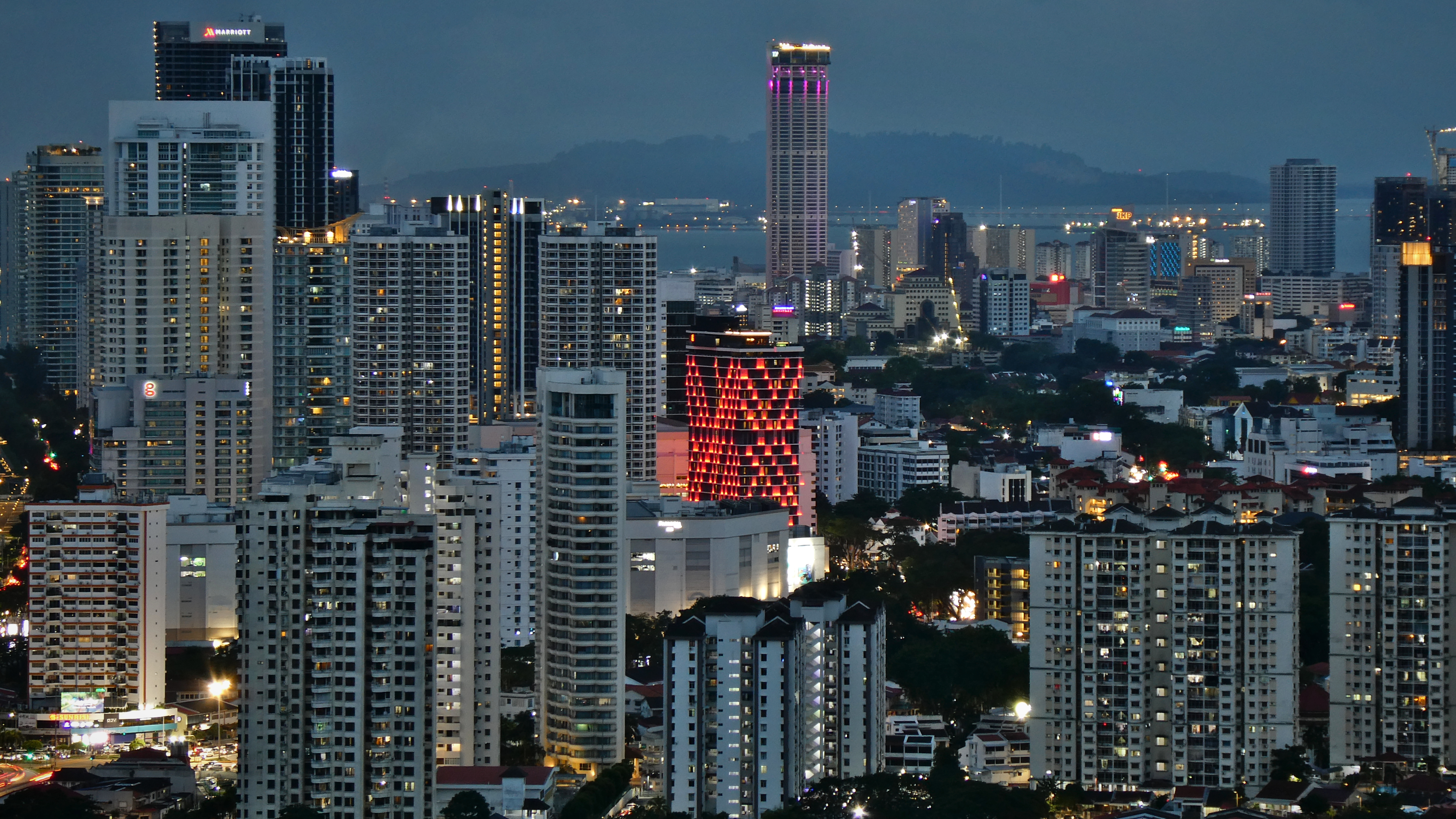
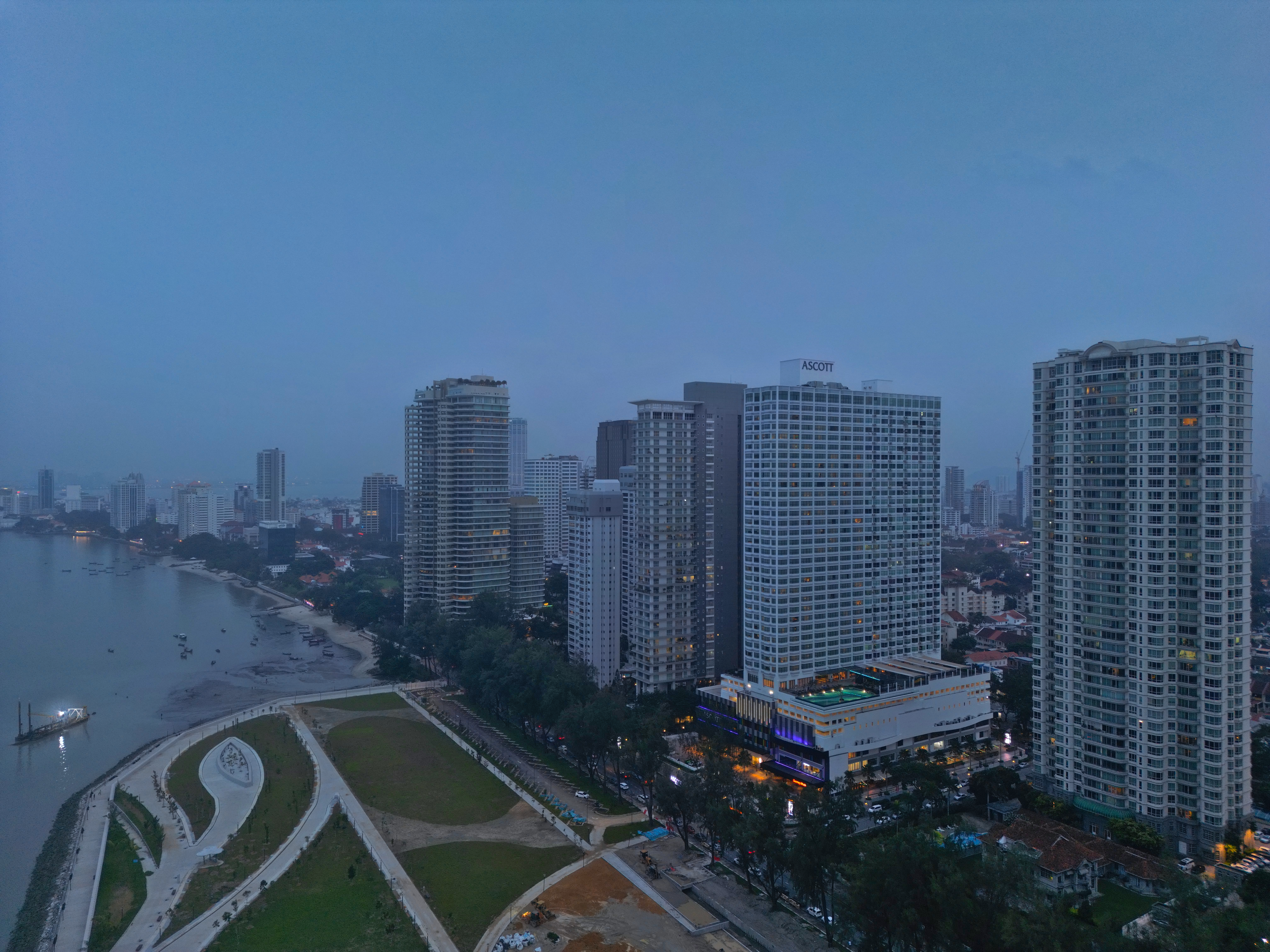
- From top, left to right: Gurney Drive; Colonial-era bank buildings at Beach Street; Komtar at night; CBD skyline; A ferry off the Raja Tun Uda Ferry Terminal; Skyscrapers along Northam Road
- Interactive map of George Town Central Business District
- Coordinates: 5°24′52.1″N 100°19′44″E
- Country: Malaysia
- State: Penang
- City: George Town
- Time zone: UTC+8 (Malaysian Standard Time)
- Postcode: 100xx
- Area codes: +6042

UNESCO World Heritage Site
- Part of: Melaka and George Town, the Historic Cities of the Straits of Malacca
- Criteria: Cultural: ii, iii, iv
- Reference: 1223-002
- Inscription: 2008 (32nd Session)
- Area: 109.38 ha (270.3 acres)
- Buffer zone: 150.04 ha (370.8 acres)

The George Town Central Business District (CBD) is the financial and political centre of the city of George Town, the capital of the Malaysian state of Penang. The financial district, which was first envisioned by the Penang Island City Council's Local Plan 2030, lies entirely within the city centre, and is home to much of the city's banking and financial services. The term CBD is often used interchangeably with Downtown George Town, encompassing both the historic core and modern sections of the city centre.

== Background ==
Beach Street is one of the oldest streets in George Town, and has been the mercantile and financial hub of the city since its early days. During the 19th century, the street was located adjacent to the old Port of Penang; European traders and merchants were concentrated around its northern end, near the piers and administrative institutions at Light Street. In 1875, the Chartered Bank of India, Australia and China (now Standard Chartered) became the first international bank to establish a branch at Beach Street. Several other banks and mercantile firms followed suit, such as the Hongkong and Shanghai Banking Corporation (now HSBC), the Netherlands Trading Society and the Oversea-Chinese Bank Limited (now OCBC).

Between the 1870s and the 1890s, land reclamation was carried out to provide more land for mercantile trade, eventually pushing out George Town's eastern coastline. Following the reclamation, Beach Street no longer served as a coastal road, causing many trading firms to relocate to the newly created eastern side of the road, which was closer to the port.

In the 1990s, as the city's banks began reassessing their spatial requirements to accommodate greater business volumes, a number of commercial developments commenced along Northam Road. The commercial skyscrapers along this road quickly attracted various banking, auditing and other ancillary services, as the newer buildings offer more space and amenities that the colonial-era buildings at Beach Street lacked. By the early 2000s, Northam Road and the adjacent Gurney Drive emerged as a new financial precinct.

It was not until 2022 when the Penang Island City Council, the local government that administers George Town, released a draft of its Local Plan 2030, which formally proposed the CBD as one of the economic corridors within the city. Covering a significant portion of Penang Island's northeastern promontory up to the northern banks of the Pinang River, including areas such as the city's UNESCO World Heritage Site, Pulau Tikus, Kampung Siam, Kampong Serani and Ayer Rajah, the CBD was envisioned as the hub for financial and service sectors, with the aim of bolstering George Town's standing as a global city.

== Economy ==
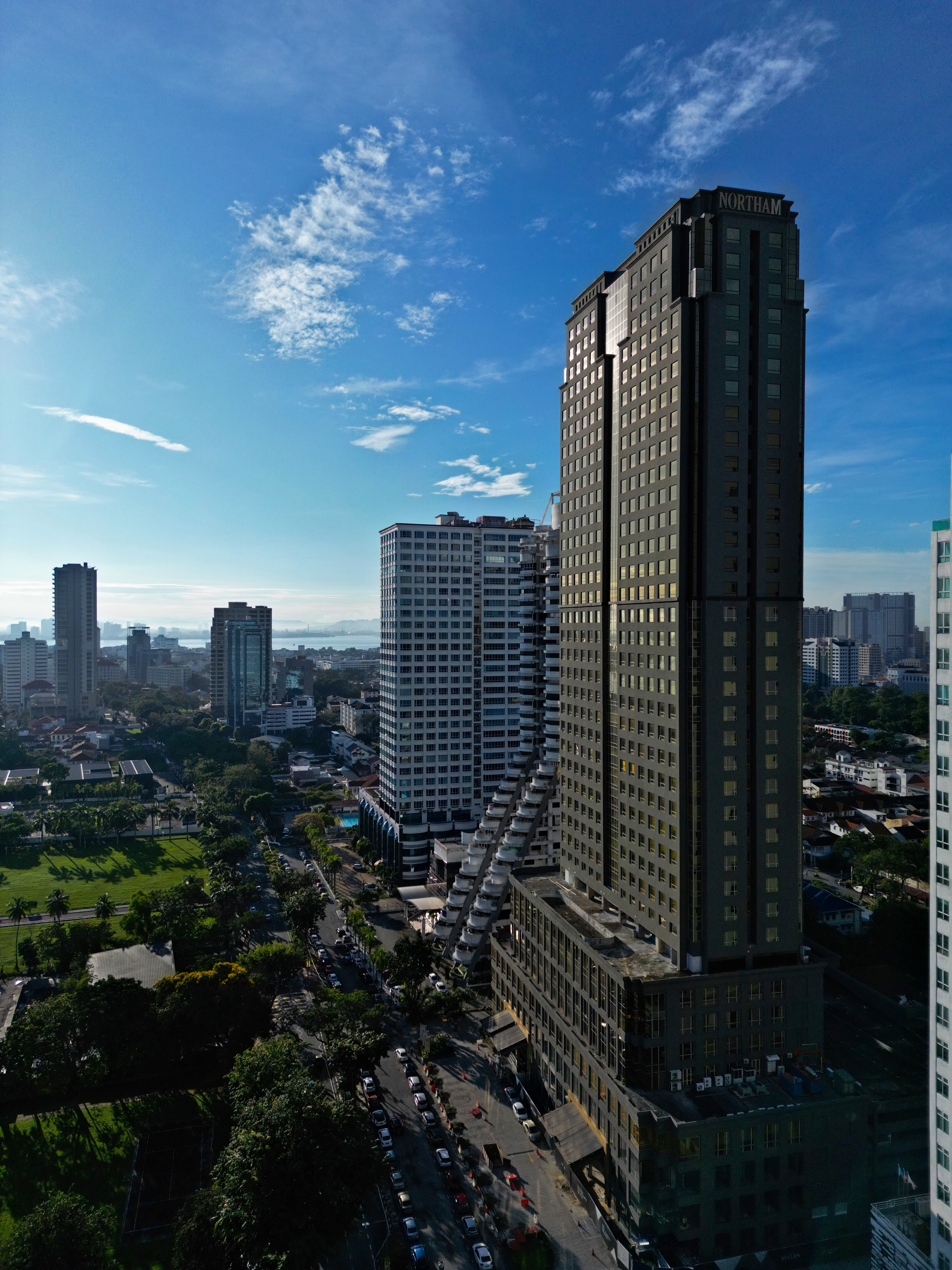
Commercial skyscrapers along Northam Road

Much of George Town's financial, services and retail activities are concentrated within the CBD, home to several international banks including Standard Chartered, HSBC, Citibank and Bank of China. The CBD also houses federal financial institutions like Bank Negara and the Employees Provident Fund, along with various auditing, business intelligence and legal firms.

Tourism plays a significant role in the economy of the downtown area due to the UNESCO World Heritage Site's role as a tourist destination. Swettenham Pier and Raja Tun Uda Ferry Terminal are the two major entry points within the CBD, facilitating ease of access for tourists. The ongoing refurbishment of shophouses and alleys throughout downtown George Town has contributed to the growth of the area's retail centres and medical tourism. Among the well-known healthcare facilities within the CBD are Penang Adventist Hospital, Gleneagles Hospital Penang and Island Hospital.

Locations of major businesses and landmarks within the George Town CBD.
Click link at the top right corner to zoom in.
1 Komtar
2 1st Avenue
3 Prangin Mall
4 HSBC
5 Standard Chartered
6 Bank of China
7 OCBC
8 Al-Rajhi Bank
9 China Construction Bank
10 UOB
11 Citibank
12 Deloitte
13 KPMG
14 PwC
15 IHS Markit
16 Informa
17 Gleneagles Hospital
18 Penang Adventist Hospital
19 Island Hospital
20 Loh Guan Lye Hospital
21 Penang Plaza
22 Marriott
23 Setia V
24 Gurney Plaza
25 Gurney Paragon
26 EPF Tower
27 Ascott Gurney
28 Mansion One
29 MBf Tower
30 BHL Tower
31 Boustead Tower
32 GAMA
33 Penang Times Square
34 Eastern & Oriental Hotel
35 SEGi College
36 Wawasan Open University

== Governance ==
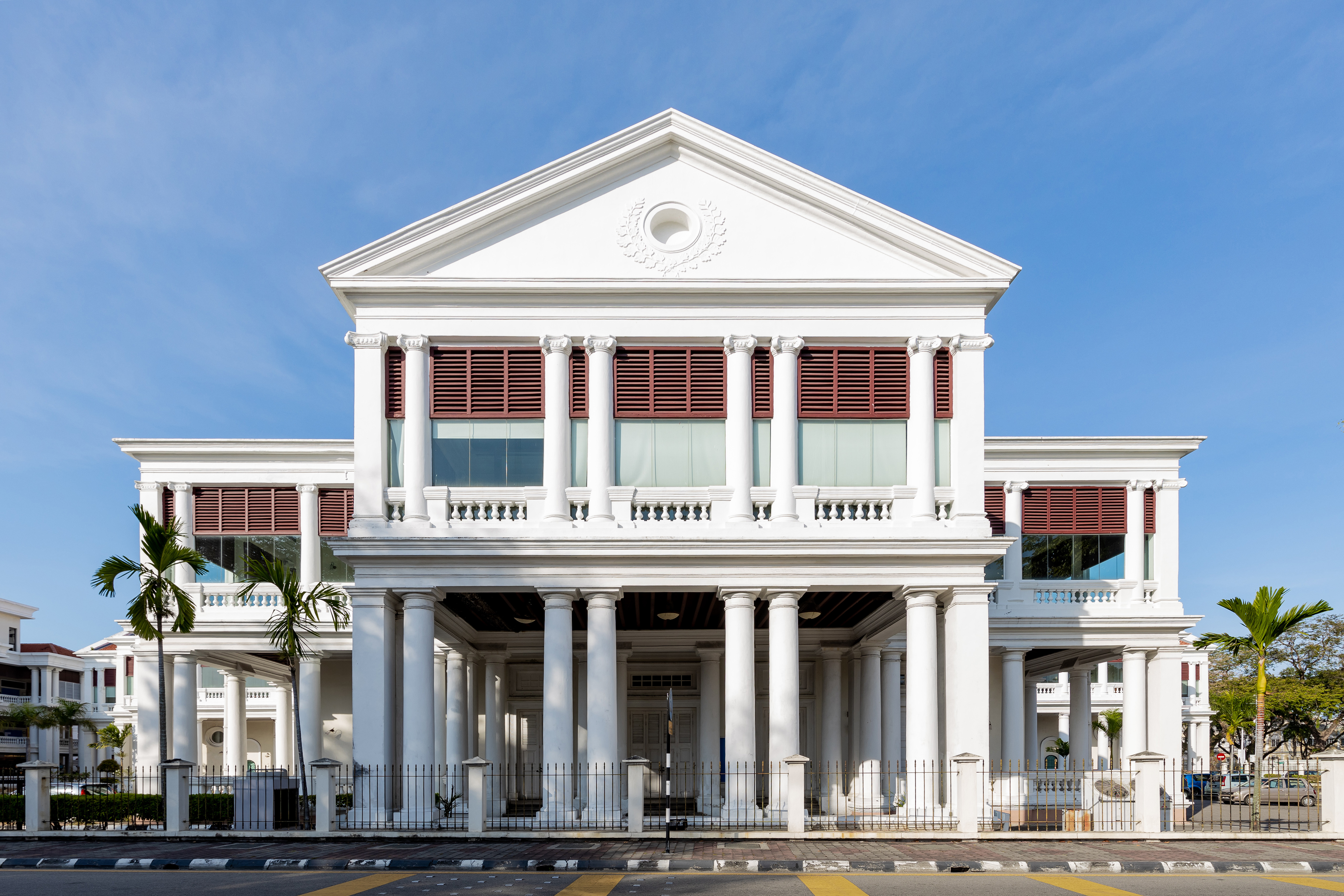
The Penang High Court sits at the top of Penang's hierarchy of courts.

The CBD also functions as the political centre of the entire State of Penang, where the executive and legislative branches of the Penang state government are located. The Chief Minister's Office, along with state government agencies and departments, are situated within Komtar, the tallest skyscraper in George Town. The Penang State Assembly Building is where the 40-member Penang state legislature convenes, while the Penang High Court is the highest court in the state. The Penang Island City Council's headquarters is also located at the City Hall. Additionally, all four consulates in George Town – China, Indonesia, Japan, and Thailand – are situated within the CBD.

== See also ==
- Downtown Core
