= EPF Tower =

Office building in George Town, Penang, Malaysia

- Menara KWSP (Malay)
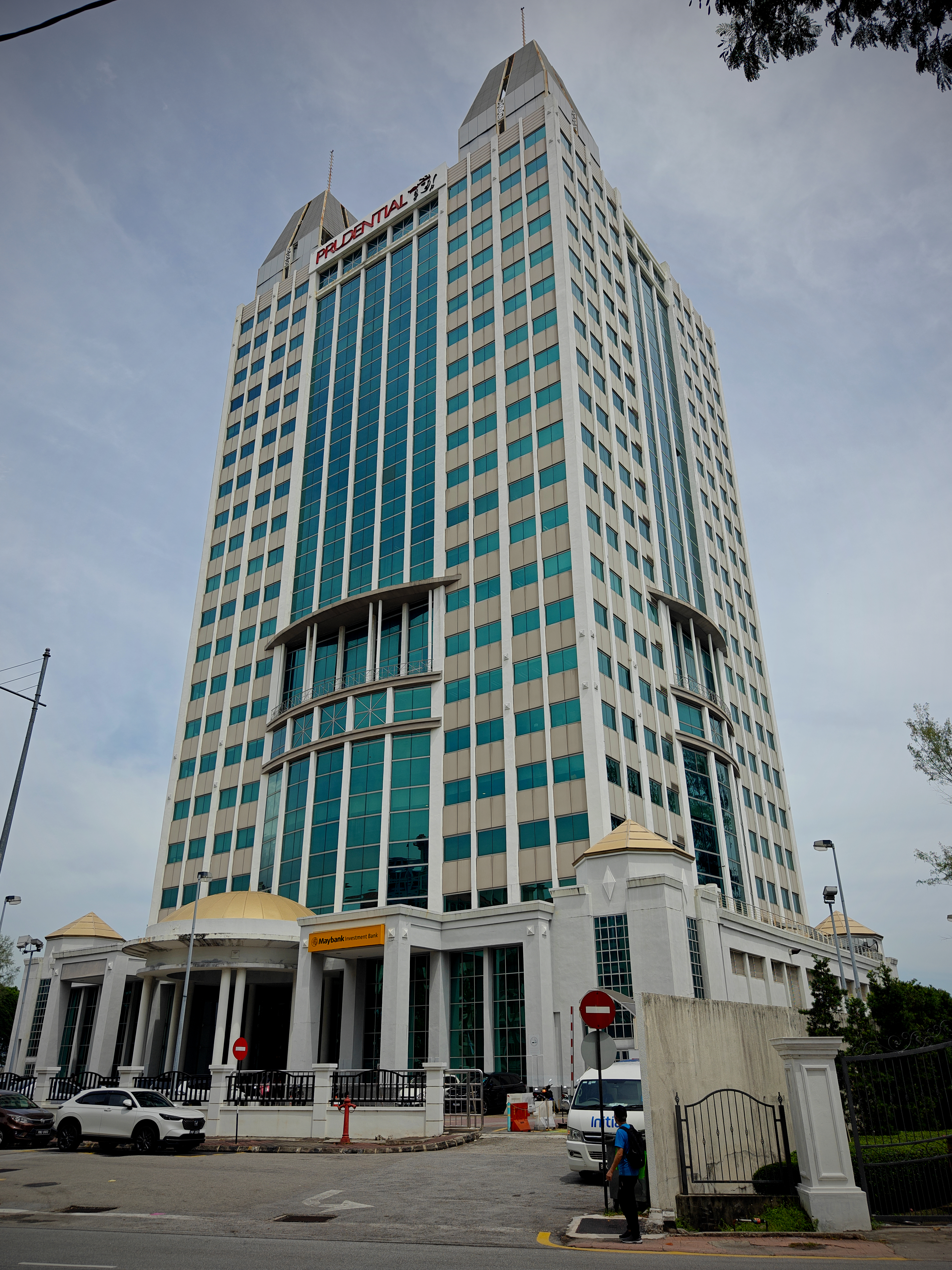

General information
- Location: 38, Northam Road, 10050 George Town, Penang, Malaysia, George Town, Penang, Malaysia
- Coordinates: 5.4238°N 100.3304°E
- Current tenants: Employees Provident Fund
- Completed: 2002
- Owner: Employees Provident Fund

Height
- Top floor: 23

Technical details
- Floor count: 23
- Floor area: 409,391 sq ft (38,033.7 m^{2})
- Grounds: 1.69 acres (0.68 ha)

Design and construction
- Developer: Runnymede Hotels

EPF Tower is an office building within George Town in the Malaysian state of Penang. Located at Northam Road within the city's Central Business District (CBD), the 23-storey building was completed in 2002. It accommodates a branch of the Employees Provident Fund (EPF), a federal pension fund, as well as financial and banking firms such as Prudential, Maybank, PwC and IHS Markit.

== History ==
EPF Tower is located on a 1.69-acre (0.68 ha) plot adjacent to the defunct Runnymede Hotel as part of a mixed-use development by Runnymede Hotels. In 1999, Runnymede Hotels received approval from the Penang Island City Council (MBPP) for the project, which included the present-day building, two additional office blocks and the refurbishment of the hotel. The construction of EPF Tower was completed by 2002.

The project has faced controversy, with only the EPF Tower being completed. In 2016, Runnymede Hotels demolished the ancillary buildings at the defunct hotel, sparking outrage from heritage activists. Built in 1921, the three-storey hotel had previously served as a British Army base and later as a Malaysian Army facility before being acquired by Runnymede Hotels in 2014. In response to the criticism from heritage activists, Mayor Patahiyah Ismail stated that Runnymede Hotels' planning permission from 1999 remained valid due to the completion of the EPF Tower. In 2018, it was reported that Runnymede Hotels entered into an agreement with Ritz-Carlton to redevelop the hotel.

== See also ==
- List of tallest buildings in George Town
