= Boustead Tower =

Office building in George Town, Penang, Malaysia

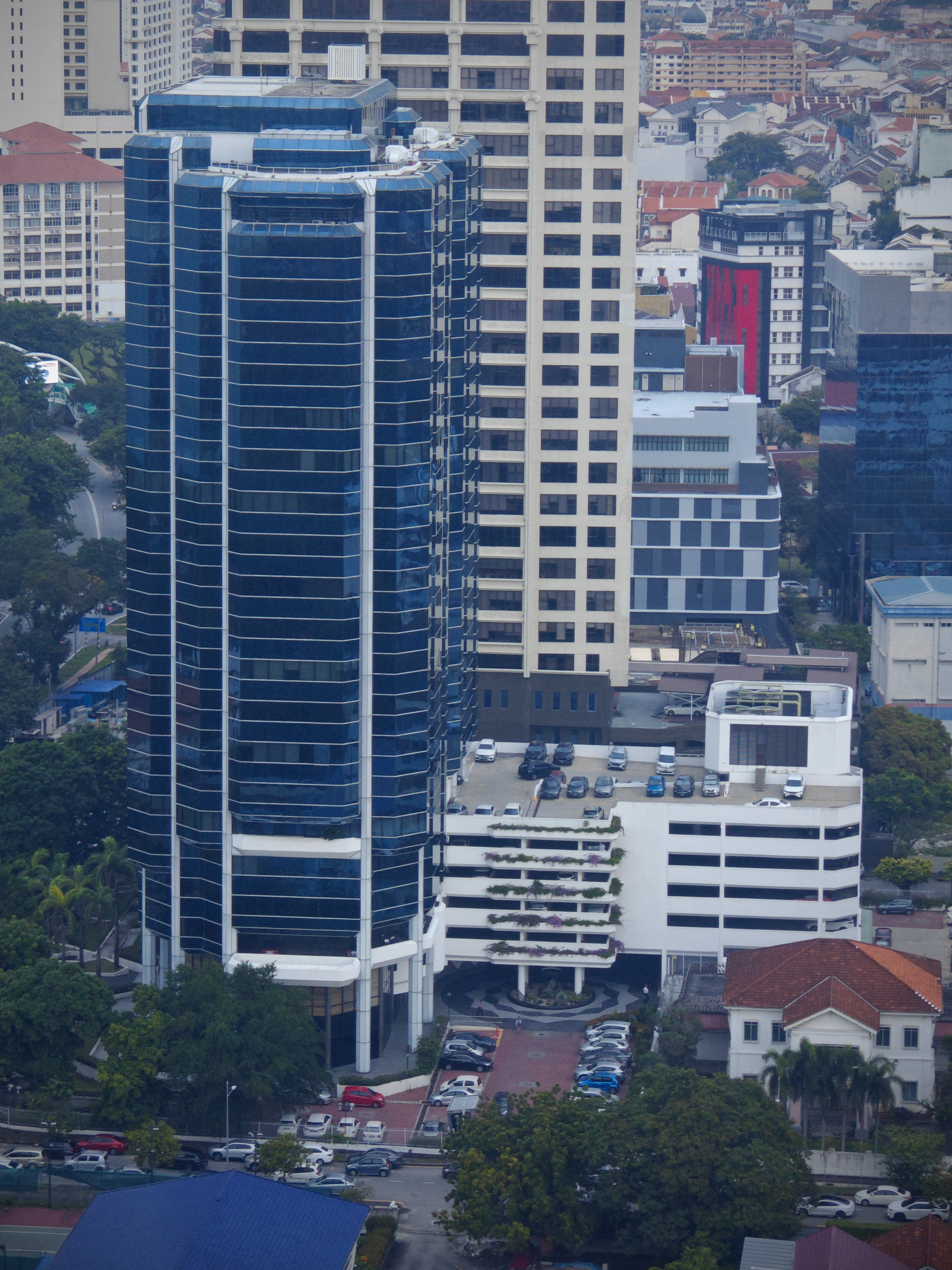
- Interactive map of the Boustead Tower area
- Former names: PSCI Tower

General information
- Location: 39, Northam Road, 10050 George Town, Penang, Malaysia, George Town, Penang, Malaysia
- Coordinates: 5.42464°N 100.32533°E
- Opened: 1994
- Owner: Boustead Holdings

Height
- Top floor: 21

Technical details
- Floor count: 21
- Grounds: 71,817 sq ft (6,672.0 m^{2})

Menara Boustead Penang, formerly known as PSCI Tower, is an office building within George Town in the Malaysian state of Penang. Located at Northam Road within the city's Central Business District (CBD), the 21-storey building was completed in 1994. It was sold to Boustead Holdings in 2006. Apart from Boustead, IWG plc is one of the major tenants of the tower.

== History ==
The building, originally named PSCI Tower after its owner, Penang Shipbuilding and Construction Industries (PSCI), was completed in 1994. It comprises a 21-storey office block with a five-storey car park annex on a 6,672 m^{2} (71,820 sq ft) plot of land.

In 2006, PSCI sold the building to Boustead Holdings for RM54 million due to mounting debts. The building has since become home to both governmental and private tenants. In 2017, IWG plc established a 10,700 sq ft (990 m^{2}) business centre under the Regus brand within the tower, making it the company's third office in Penang after Bayan Lepas and Gurney Paragon. This was followed by the China Construction Bank, which opened its Penang branch within the building in 2023. However, reports in 2020 indicated that Boustead planned to sell the building as part of its asset rationalisation.

== See also ==
- List of tallest buildings in George Town
