= Macalister Mansion =

Mansion and hotel in George Town, Penang, Malaysia

Coordinates: 5.4192°N 100.3188°E

- Interactive map of the Macalister Mansion area

General information
- Type: Residential mansion
- Architectural style: English Mansion
- Classification: Hotel and Restaurant
- Location: 228 Macalister Road, 10400 George Town, Penang, Malaysia., Georgetown, Penang, Malaysia
- Estimated completion: 1880
- Renovated: 2012

Technical details
- Floor area: 1,700 square meters

Design and construction
- Other designers: Ministry of Design

Website
- http://www.macalistermansion.com/

Macalister Mansion (formerly the Choong Lye Hock Mansion) is a more than 100-year-old heritage-listed mansion located in George Town, Penang, Malaysia. Built in 1880, it has been conserved and adapted for use as a hotel.

== History ==
With a floor area of about 1,700 m^{2} (18,000 sq ft), the mansion was originally built in 1880, and is one of the oldest extent residential mansions in Penang. It was originally owned by a rich Indian moneylender, but was later bought by local peranakan nonya tycoon Choong Lye Hock, a successful businessman and property developer, who was one of the richest persons in Penang at that time.

The Choong family moved out of the mansion in the 1970s, and rented it out as commercial space for a succession of renters. The mansion was renovated for use as a hotel in the early 2010s. The Macalister Mansion redesign was headed by Ministry of Design, a Singaporean-owned architecture firm, and renovation was completed in 2012.

=== Name ===
Originally known as the Choong Lye Hock Mansion, it was renamed the Macalister Mansion after it was repurposed as a hotel in 2012. Its name reflects its location on Macalister Road, and honours Norman Macalister, a former British Governor Colonel of Penang, who was lost at sea in 1810.

== See also ==
- Woodville
