= Adventist College of Nursing and Health Sciences =

Nursing school in Penang, Malaysia

- Kolej Kejururawatan dan Sains Kesihatan Adventist (Malay) 槟安护理专科学院 (Chinese)
- Former names: Adventist College of Nursing (1993-2011)
- Type: Private college
- Established: 1993
- Affiliations: Penang Adventist Hospital
- Religious affiliation: Seventh-day Adventist Church
- Location: Penang, Malaysia; 5.433300°N 100.305997°E
- Language: English and Malay
- Programmes offered: Diploma in Nursing (RN); Assistant Nurse Certificate (AN)
- Website: www.acnhs.edu.my

Adventist College of Nursing and Health Sciences
- Simplified Chinese: 槟安护理专科学院
- Traditional Chinese: 檳安護理專科學院
Transcriptions
Standard Mandarin
- Hanyu Pinyin: Bīnān Hùlǐ Zhuānkē Xuéyuàn

The Adventist College of Nursing and Health Sciences (ACNHS) is a private nursing school in Penang, Malaysia and offers nurse training programs at the undergraduate level. It was established in 1993 and is closely associated with Penang Adventist Hospital and forms part of a network of Seventh-day Adventist owned institutions of higher education. The college is accredited by the Malaysian Qualifications Agency to offer the Diploma in Nursing and Assistant Nurse certificate.

== History ==
From the 1960s till 1980, Penang Adventist Hospital had been sending students to The School of Nursing of the Bangkok Adventist Hospital, Thailand. In the mid 1980s, the government of Thailand disallowed foreign students from sitting for the national certificate and registration examination, so Penang Adventist Hospital stopped sending students to Thailand and sought an alternative.

ACNHS received approval to operate from governmental authorities in October 1992 as Adventist College of Nursing. The school's first offering was a three-year Diploma Nursing program in September 1993. In September 1994, offered the 15-month conversion program to convert the existing nursing aides to assistant nurses. A total of 3 batches of assistant nurses were trained. Thereafter the conversion program was stopped and replaced by the 24-month Assistant Nurse Certificate Course which started in January 1998.

The college was renamed the Adventist College of Nursing and Health Sciences (ACNHS) as of January 1, 2011.
