= Mansion One =

Commercial skyscraper in Penang, Malaysia

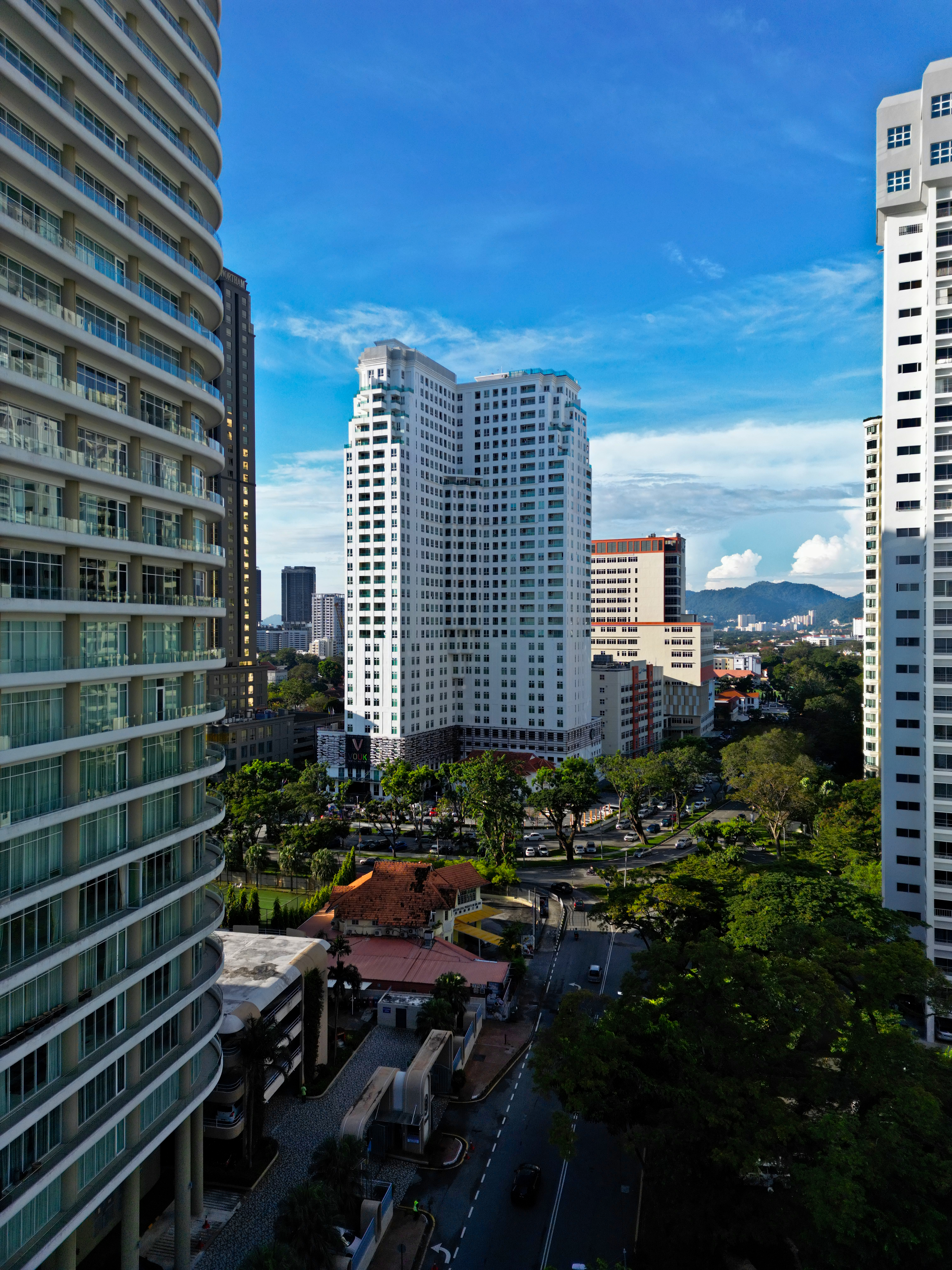
- Interactive map of the Mansion One area

General information
- Type: Hotel
- Location: Northam Road, 10050 George Town, Penang, Malaysia, George Town, Penang, Malaysia
- Coordinates: 5.427605°N 100.320875°E
- Completed: 1998
- Owner: Magna Putih Sdn Bhd

Height
- Roof: 122 m (400 ft)
- Top floor: 30

Technical details
- Floor count: 30

Mansion One is a commercial skyscraper within George Town in the Malaysian state of Penang. Located at Northam Road within the city's Central Business District (CBD), this 30-storey building adjacent to Gleneagles Hospital Penang contains 277 suites and 110 hotel rooms.

== History ==
Built in 1998, the skyscraper was originally named Northam Tower. It functioned as the Supreme Court of Penang between 2006 and 2011 when the original court building at Light Street underwent renovation works. Aside from the court, the structure also once housed the regional offices of Samsung, EON Bank and ING Insurance.

In 2011, the skyscraper was acquired by Magna Putih Sdn Bhd, a local private limited firm. The building was subsequently renovated into a hotel and renamed Mansion One.

== See also ==
- List of tallest buildings in George Town
- Northam Road
