= Northam Road, George Town =

Road in the Malaysian state of Penang

Northam Road
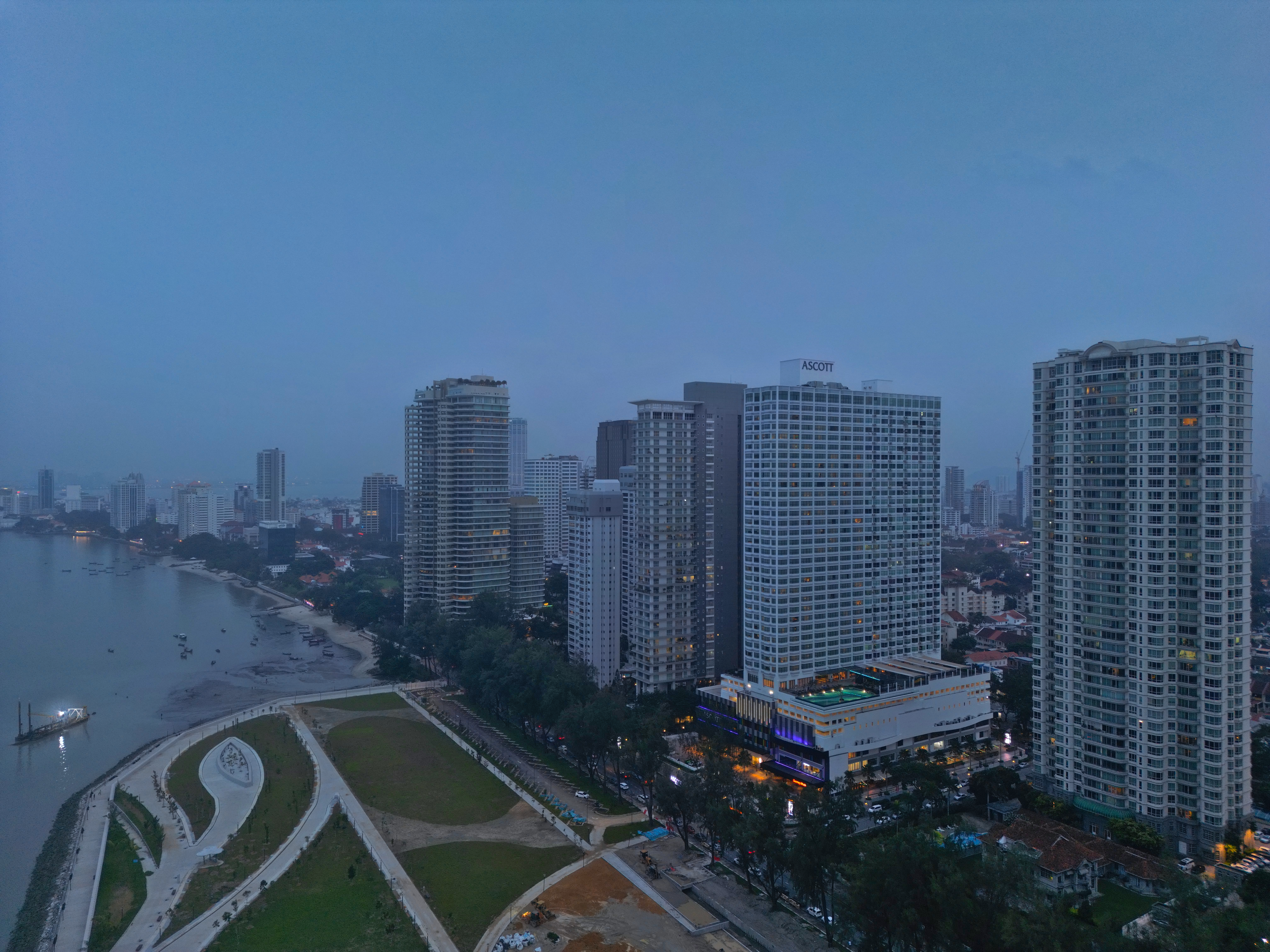
- Native name: Malay: Jalan Sultan Ahmad Shah; Simplified Chinese: 红毛路; traditional Chinese: 紅毛路
- Maintained by: Penang Island City Council
- Location: George Town
- Coordinates: 5.427522°N 100.321725°E
- West end: Gurney Drive; Kelawei Road; Jalan Pangkor
- East end: Farquhar Street

Construction
- Inauguration: 19th century
- JALAN SULTAN AHMAD SHAH Northam Rd10050 P. PINANG

Northam Road is a major thoroughfare along the northern coast of the city of George Town in the Malaysian state of Penang. It continues on from Gurney Drive towards Farquhar Street to the east. Since the 1990s, Northam Road has been part of the city's Central Business District, and along with Gurney Drive, it has seen a significant increase in financial activity.

In the olden days, the northern coast of George Town was simply known as the 'North Beach'. British administrators, including the founder of Penang, Francis Light, were buried within the Old Protestant Cemetery near the eastern end of Northam Road. The road gradually became the address of choice for the Europeans, and later, Chinese tycoons, who built elegant mansions along the road. As a result, Northam Road was also known as the Millionaire's Row by the locals.

Northam Road is also home to some of the tallest skyscrapers in Penang, many of which house commercial enterprises like banks, insurance firms, property and car dealers, and other businesses.

== Naming ==
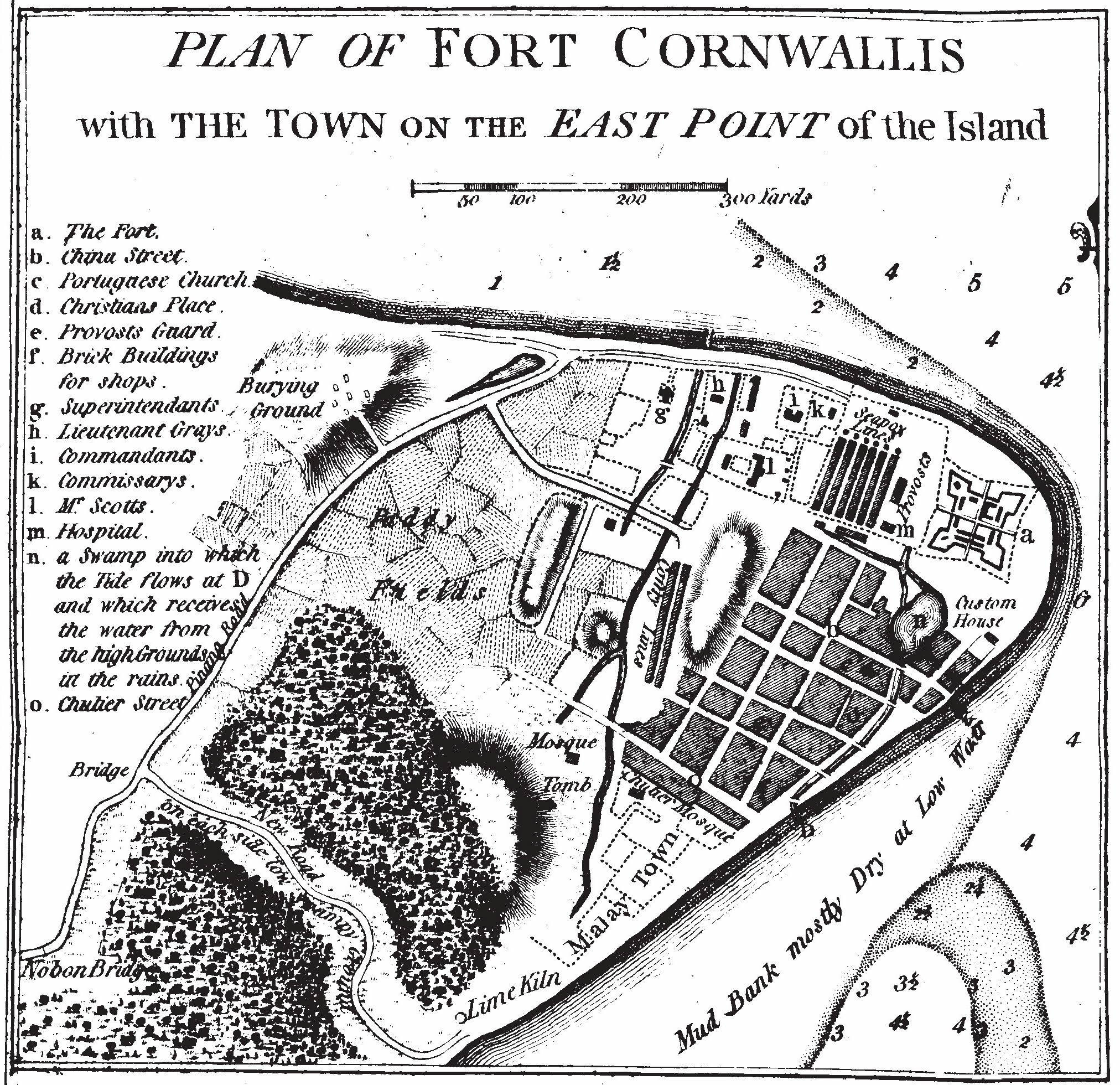
The Old Protestant Cemetery can be seen in this 1799 map of George Town.

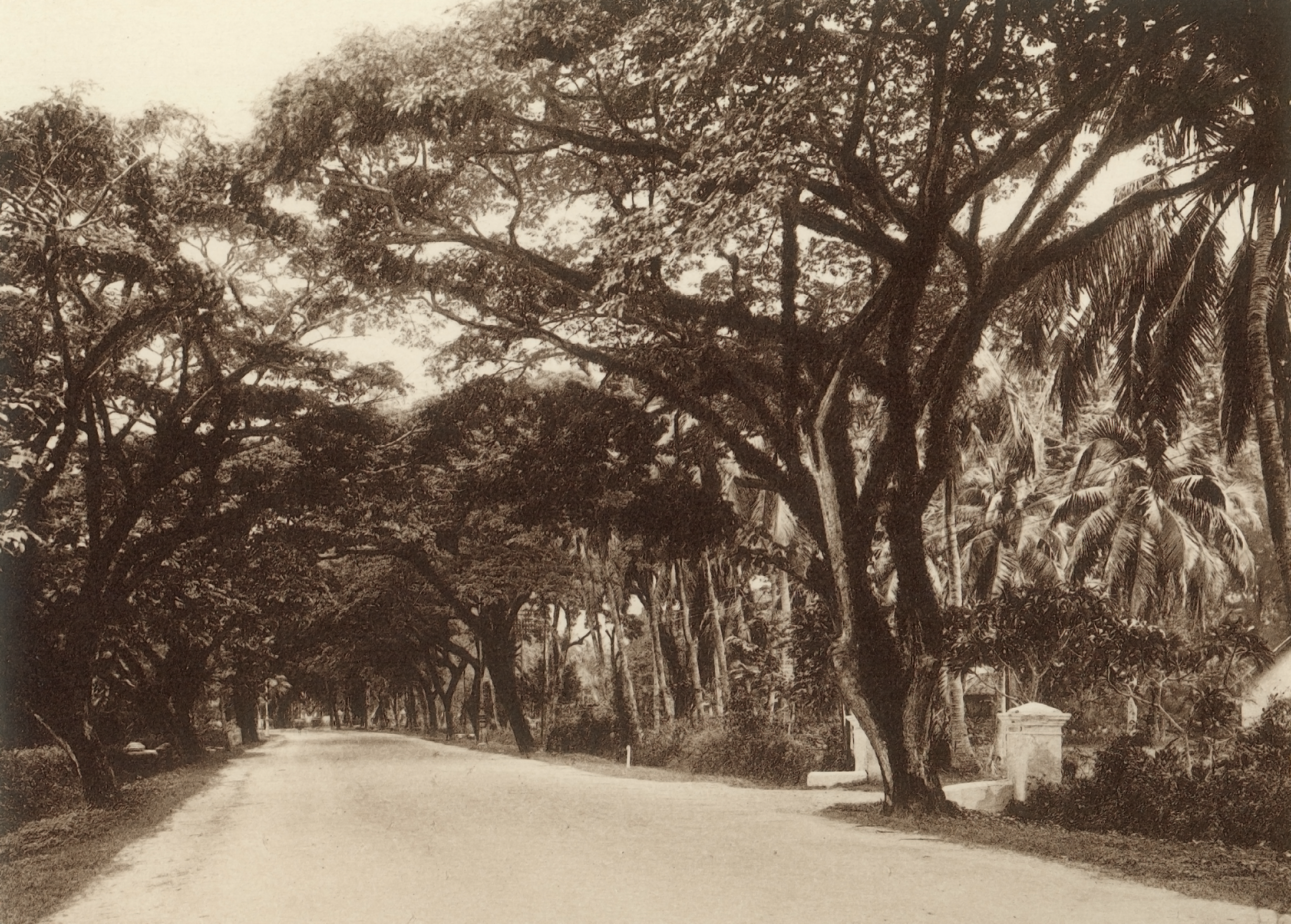
Northam Road in the 1910s. Photo by C.J. Kleingrothe.

Northam Road was originally named after Northam, Devon, in southwest England. It was officially renamed as Jalan Sultan Ahmad Shah in the 1980s, in honour of the then King of Malaysia, Sultan Ahmad Shah, who visited Penang in 1982. Nonetheless, local Penangites continue to refer to the road by its colonial name, Northam Road. This is partly because the new name sounds unwieldy, but also reflects a strong conservatism among the locals, who view Penang's colonial history as part of their local identity.

== History ==
During the early years of British rule, British officers and other Europeans were buried within the Old Protestant Cemetery. These included Captain Francis Light, who founded Penang in 1786 and died in 1794. At the time, Northam Road had yet to come into existence and the area was simply known as the 'North Beach'.

Throughout the 19th century, Northam Road evolved into the suburban area of choice for wealthy Europeans, who began building bungalows along the road. The Europeans later moved out of Northam Road for greener, leafy neighbourhoods further inland, leaving the bungalows along the road to be snapped up by Chinese businessmen, who in turn constructed more elegant bungalows along the road. Many of the wealthy Chinese who resided along Northam Road, such as Yeap Chor Ee, Loh Boon Siew and Lim Lean Teng, also chose European names for their residences, reflecting the upper-class preferences for all things European.

In 1980, Northam Court, a 16-storey luxurious condominium project under construction was demolished just before completion when it began tilting and was at risk of collapse. Since the 1990s, the completion of commercial skyscrapers along Northam Road has turned the coastal thoroughfare into a significant part of the city's Central Business District. The construction of these skyscrapers have been made possible as the road technically lies outside the city's UNESCO World Heritage Site.

== Landmarks ==
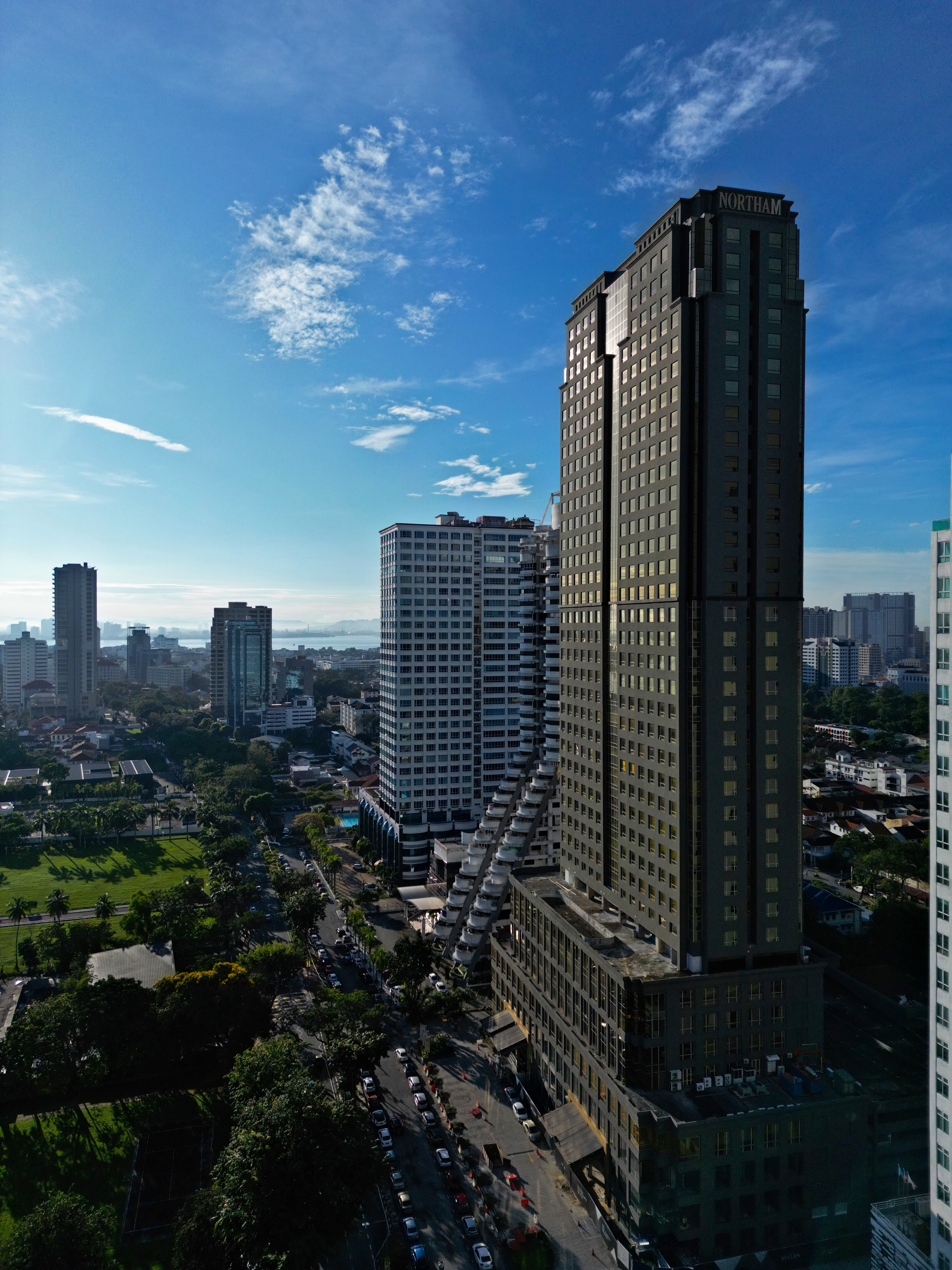
The skyscrapers along Northam Road contains the branches of various banks, financial services, logistics companies and technology firms.

- Old Protestant Cemetery
- Kedah House, the residence of the Sultan of Kedah
- Homestead, formerly the residence of Yeap Chor Ee and now part of Wawasan Open University
- Woodville

=== Skyscrapers ===
- Mansion One
- MBf Tower
- BHL Tower
- Boustead Tower
- EPF Tower
- Menara Northam
- Sri Perdana Condominium

== See also ==
- List of roads in George Town
- Architecture of Penang
- George Town Central Business District
