= Ban Hin Lee Bank building =

Bank building in Penang, Malaysia

Coordinates: 5°24′58″N 100°20′29″E

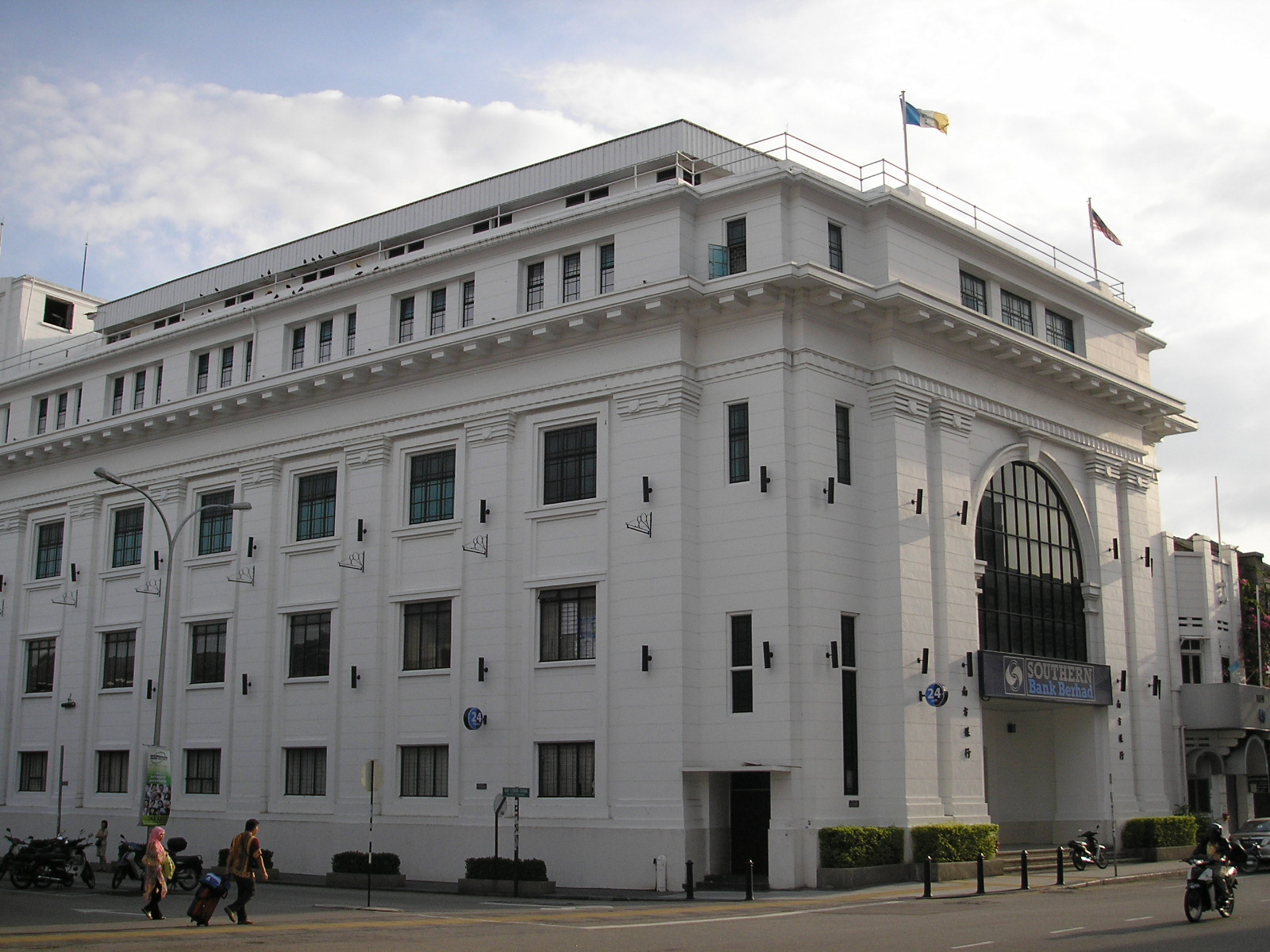

General information
- Architectural style: Art Deco
- Location: 43 Beach Street
- Town or city: George Town, Penang
- Country: Malaysia
- Completed: 1938

Design and construction
- Architect(s): Stark and McNeill

The Ban Hin Lee Bank building is situated in Beach Street, George Town, Penang, Malaysia.

== History ==
The building was completed in 1938 by Yeap Chor Ee, business magnate, described at the time as the wealthiest man in Penang. Having established the first locally owned and managed bank, Ban Hin Lee and Co. (meaning “Ten Thousand Prosperities”) in 1918, he converted his banking business into a limited liability company in 1935, and the following year began construction of the bank building on land that he owned at No.43 Beach Street in the heart of the commercial district.

The building was designed by architect, Ung Ban Hoe of Stark and McNeill, construction was carried out by Ang Hooi Sin, and the cost was $200,000. The doors of the strongroom were imported from England, high-grade cement from Japan, and marble used for the floors. The bank moved into the building in 1938, and the upper floors were let to tenants.

== Description ==
The four-storey rectangular building, constructed in the Arte Deco style, had a large internal air-well from ground to top floor to provide maximum light and air circulation, and is said to comply with principles of fengshui.
