= Old Protestant Cemetery, George Town =

Cemetery in Penang, Malaysia

Old Protestant Cemetery
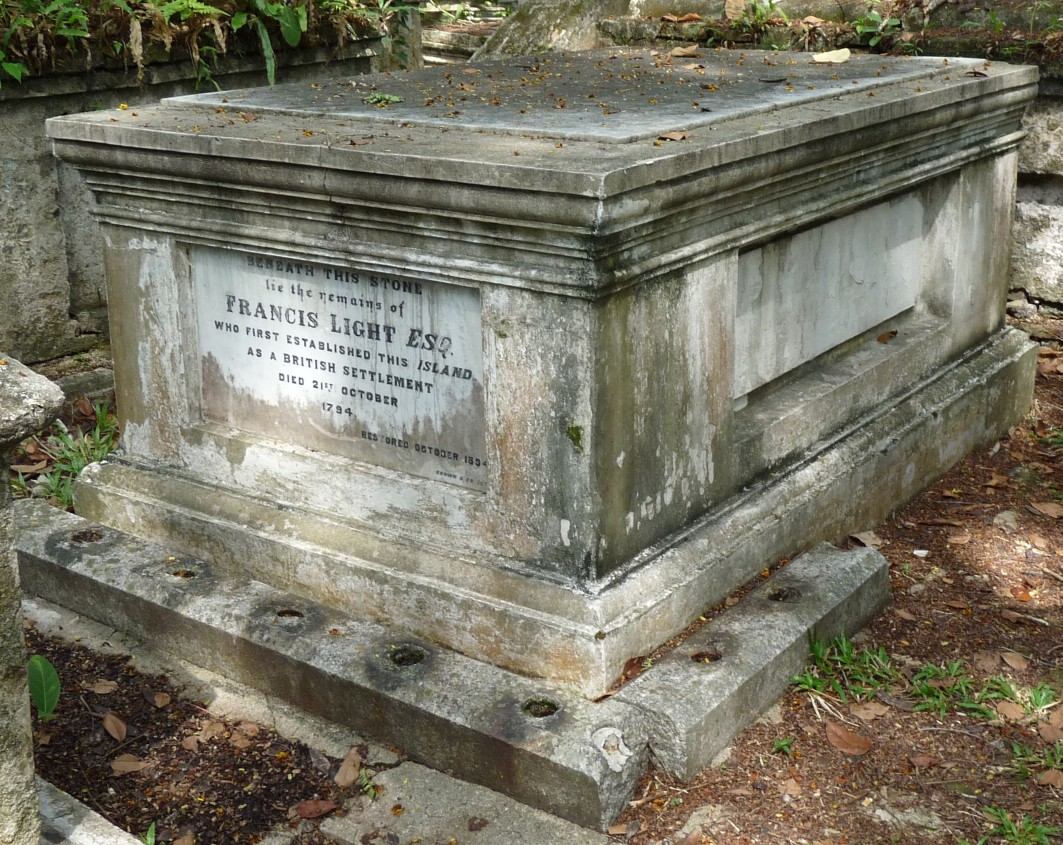
- Grave of Capt. Francis Light
- Interactive map of Old Protestant Cemetery

Details
- Established: 1786
- Location: George Town, Penang
- Country: Malaysia
- Type: Protestant cemetery
- No. of graves: 5.42255°N 100.333231°E
- Find a Grave: Old Protestant Cemetery

The Old Protestant Cemetery (Malay: Tanah Perkuburan Protestan Lama), also known as Northam Road Cemetery, is a disused Protestant cemetery in George Town, Penang, Malaysia. After more than a century of neglect, it is now listed as a Class 1 Heritage Site and is maintained by the Penang Heritage Trust.

The cemetery lies in a grove of frangipani trees along Northam Road (now Jalan Sultan Ahmad Shah) near the historic core of George Town, only metres away from the beachfront and a short walk from the Eastern & Oriental Hotel.

Established in 1786, the cemetery is of significant historic interest: it is older than many better-known burial grounds such as Père Lachaise in Paris, Powązki in Warsaw, the Zentralfriedhof in Vienna, and Highgate Cemetery in London. It is also 35 years older than the Old Protestant Cemetery in Macau. In 2012, conservation works were undertaken to protect and preserve the site, although there was some concern about how the restoration was done.

== History and description ==
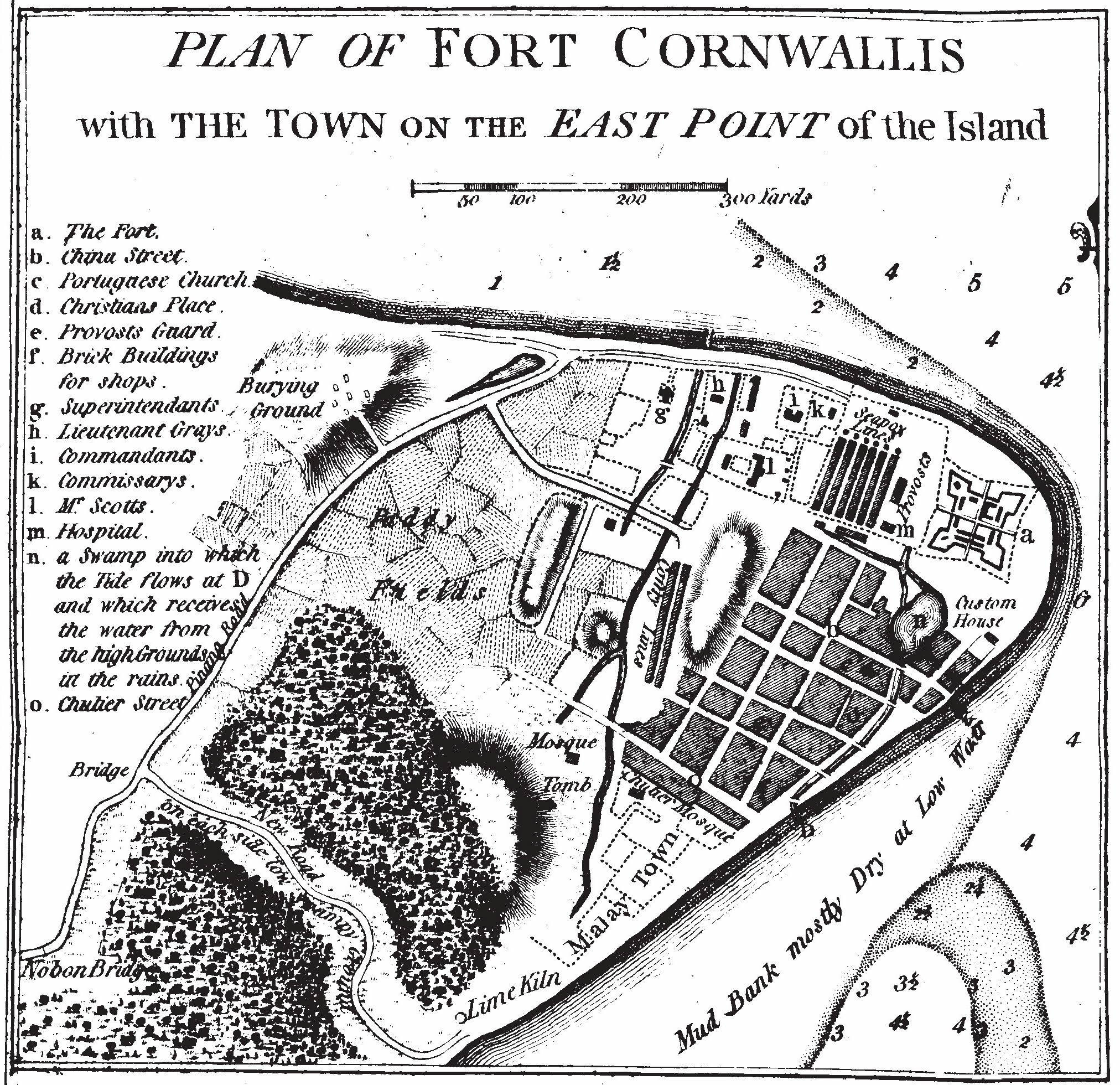
In this 1799 map of George Town by Sir Home Riggs Popham, the Old Protestant Cemetery is named the "Burying Ground", seen in the upper left (west) part of the map.

Northam Road Cemetery was the first cemetery to be consecrated after Captain Francis Light founded the Prince of Wales Island Settlement in 1786. The first recorded burial was of Lt. William Murray of the Bengal Artillery in 1787; the grave marker is no longer extant. The earliest surviving grave marker is that of one H.D.D. Cunningham from 1789 (the exact location of his/her grave within the grounds is unknown, though the plaque survives on a wall of the cemetery). The last person to be buried at the cemetery was Cornelia Josephine Van Someren in 1892. After that, the cemetery was closed and subsequent Christian burials have been carried out in the Western Road Cemetery.

The cemetery also contains 12 Chinese graves, refugees of the Taiping Rebellion, as well as the graves of some of Penang's early German merchants and their relatives. There are a few Armenian graves, some with inscriptions in the Armenian script, in addition to English.

Also buried in the cemetery are many of the early Governors of Penang, the brother of Stamford Raffles, Quintin Dick Thomas, and the husband of Anna Leonowens, inspiration for The King & I.

Of around 500 graves, over 25% are not identifiable due to weathering and damage. The tablets of many tombs have fallen off; some, which could not be matched to their tombs, are mounted on the south wall.

A large number of the graves is of people who died before reaching 50 years of age; many of the men and women buried are in their twenties and thirties. Several graves belong to infants.

Behind this cemetery, accessible through a small door in the wall, is the adjacent Roman Catholic Cemetery.

== Restoration and conservation efforts ==
The Cemetery is listed as a Category 1 heritage site.

The first known clean-up of the cemetery was in 1894 by British authorities, who restored Light's grave on the centennial of his death. The cemetery had been closed to new burials two years earlier.

No further restoration works took place at the cemetery until 1993–1994, when the Penang Heritage Trust repaired and cleaned the boundary walls and tombstones with donations from French plantation company SOCFIN. Faded inscriptions were also re-inked, and a large signboard in Malay and English with a site plan of important tombs was put up. The cemetery was reopened in time for Francis Light's bicentennial.

The George Town World Heritage Incorporated, Penang Island City Council and Penang Heritage Trust have been conducting maintenance works on the site regularly since then.

In 2012, the cemetery underwent a major conservation effort, a joint project by the MPPP, the Penang Heritage Trust, and GTWHI, involving a complete overhaul of the site. The first phase ended on 17 July 2012 and saw the removal of weeds, mosses and fungi on the headstones. The second phase entailed repairs to the tomb structures, and the removal of 80 trees encroaching on the old graves, and installing such amenities as a walkway, seats and rest areas for visitors. Restoration works were completed by the end of 2012. Many of the frangipani trees were trimmed or cleared, and the cemetery became more readily visible to passers-by. Most tombstones were thoroughly cleaned. Two centuries' worth of grime and mould were removed, revealing white plaster tombs and even gleaming marble stones.

In 2013, phase one of another round of tomb repair works started to save the crumbling and sinking tombs, with another 30 tombstones being repaired in September 2014. In November 2014 another phase of restoration of the cemetery, a five-week upgrading, took place.

== Notable interments ==
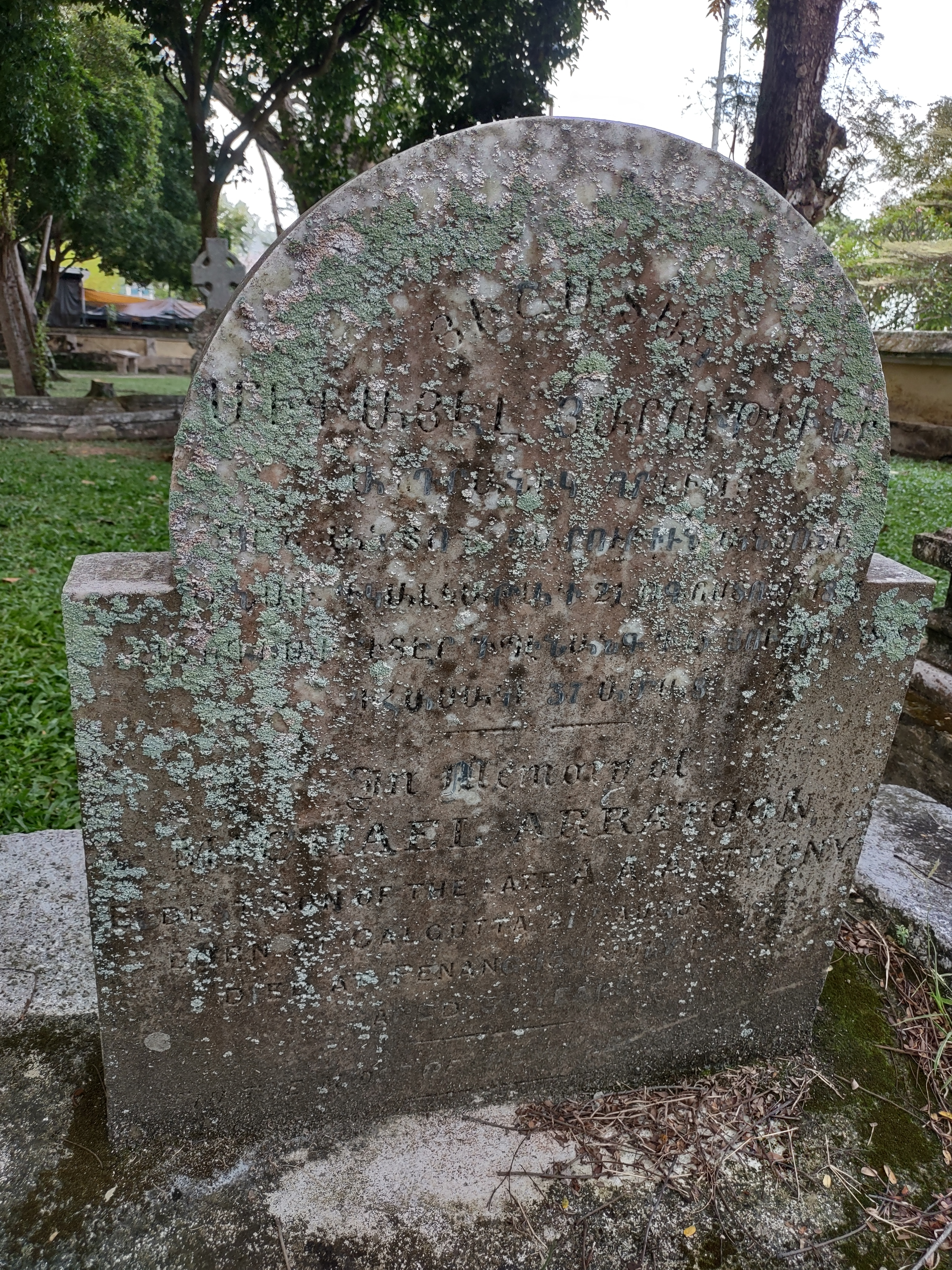
Gravestone of Michael Arratoon, with Armenian and English inscriptions

The cemetery is the final resting place of many of early Penang's most influential residents, including its founder and four Governors. A partial list is as follows:

- Michael Arratoon, son of A A Anthony. Anthony was a leading figure in the Armenian community who founded Penang's first stockbroker firm in 1830 which is still in business.
- John Alexander Bannerman, sixth Governor of Penang (under that title)
- Maria Tarn Dyer Bausum, missionary and widow of Samuel Dyer (who is buried at the Old Protestant Cemetery in Macau).
- The Browns of Glugor, local dignitaries. Close ties with the Scott family. One of the wealthiest families in 19th-century Penang, they owned vast pieces of land in George Town, including the 12-acre Padang Brown (lit. Brown's Field), which is today a popular recreation area. David Brown's Glugor Estate is the present site of the University of Science, Malaysia.
- Charles Andrew Bruce, fourth Governor of Penang (under that title). Brother of Thomas Bruce, 7th Earl of Elgin, of Elgin Marbles fame.
- Philip Dundas, first Governor of Penang (under that title)
- George Samuel Windsor Earl, ethnologist, author of The Eastern Seas. Coined the word "Indonesia", a term which his pupil James Richardson Logan was to later popularise. Both men are buried in the cemetery.
- Sir John Gordon (of Embo), 8th Baronet, lieutenant of engineers, Bengal Army
- Several members of the Gottlieb family, German merchants who played a substantial role in commerce in 19th century Penang
- Rev. Robert Sparke Hutchings, founder of the Penang Free School
- Several members of the Huttenbach family, German industrialists who provided Penang with its first electric lamps.
- John Ince (missionary), with his wife Joanna and three of their infant children
- Thomas Kekewich, notable as the only recorded suicide in the cemetery, at a time when it was still common to bury suicides in unmarked graves
- Thomas Leonowens, husband of Anna Leonowens
- William Thomas Lewis, Resident Councillor of Penang (and many more positions in Malacca and Bencoolen) and friend of Thomas Stamford Raffles
- James Richardson Logan, lawyer of prominent local standing and activist for native rights. A pupil of George Windsor Earl, he introduced the word "Indonesia" to common usage.
- Capt. Francis Light
- Gregory Lucas, Esq, an Armenian merchant from Tiflis who became one of the residents of George Town.
- William Petrie, fifth Governor of Penang (under that title)
- Several members of the Ross family, civil servants and public figures
- James Scott, co-founder of Penang (a second cousin of Sir Walter Scott). Several members of his family are also interred in a special plot.
- Quintin Dick Thompson, brother-in-law of Sir Thomas Stamford Raffles
