= Penang Adventist Hospital =

Geography
- Location: 465, Burmah Road, 10350 George Town, Penang, Malaysia
- Coordinates: 5.43263°N 100.30556°E

Organisation
- Care system: Private
- Affiliated university: Adventist College of Nursing and Health Sciences

Services
- Emergency department: Yes
- Beds: 254

History
- Founded: 1924

Links
- Website: www.pah.com.my

Penang Adventist Hospital (Malay: Hospital Adventist, Chinese: 槟安医院) is a non-profit hospital in George Town within the Malaysian state of Penang. Established in 1924, the 200-bed medical institution is part of an international network of hospitals operated by the Seventh-day Adventist Church. The hospital is well known in the community for its promotion of a healthy vegetarian diet and charity work to assist needy patients, particularly heart patients.

It has links with other hospitals in the Adventist health network, mainly Loma Linda University Medical Center and AdventHealth Orlando in the United States.

It owns Adventist College of Nursing and Health Sciences (ACNHS), a government-approved nursing school adjacent to the hospital.

== History ==
Penang Adventist Hospital began as a small clinic on 108 Muntri Street. American missionary Dr. Earl Gardner set up the clinic, the first Adventist clinic in Malaysia, in 1924 and it was called the "Seventh-day Adventist Clinic". Five years later, the clinic expanded and a sanitarium was built on premises at 465 Burmah Road, where the current hospital is located to this very day. For the next twenty years, the clinic continued its work in the community, caring for patients and training ambulance unit personnel. Through the dedication and influence of several doctors, the hospital remained open during the Japanese occupation. After the War, it was renamed "Penang Mission Hospital", which was later changed to "Penang Sanitarium and Hospital". During the 1950s and 1960s, the hospital underwent further expansion and was renamed "Penang Adventist Hospital", its current name. In the early 2000s, a new wing was added to the original building to cater to the growing needs of the various clinics.

== Accreditation ==
Penang Adventist Hospital is the second hospital in Penang to earn full 3-year accreditation from Malaysian Society for Quality in Health (MSQH) in 2002. In the year 2000, this hospital has also been awarded International Full Accreditation by The Adventist Health Services Asia. Also in 2000 it became the first Rotary International Gift of Life hospital in Asia. Again in 2005, the hospital has been awarded baby friendly status. In November 2007, the hospital marked another milestone when it became the first hospital in Malaysia to receive JCI accreditation. In 2013 the hospital became the first in Malaysia to join the International Network of Health Promoting Hospitals and Health Service (HPH).

== Adventist College of Nursing and Health Sciences ==
The hospital has an affiliated nursing school which offers the three-year registered nurse diploma and two-year assistant nurse certificate. The nursing programme has gained recognition for its excellent results in the Malaysian Board of Nursing (Lembaga Jururawat Malaysia) license examinations. Since its inception, the college has had consecutive 100% passing rates in the board examinations except for one year. Applicants may apply for a sponsorship program through the hospital itself or through other organisations and hospitals. Students sponsored by PAH are generally required to serve a maximum 5-year bond.

== See also ==
- List of Seventh-day Adventist hospitals
- List of hospitals in Malaysia
