= MBf Tower =

Office building in George Town, Penang, Malaysia

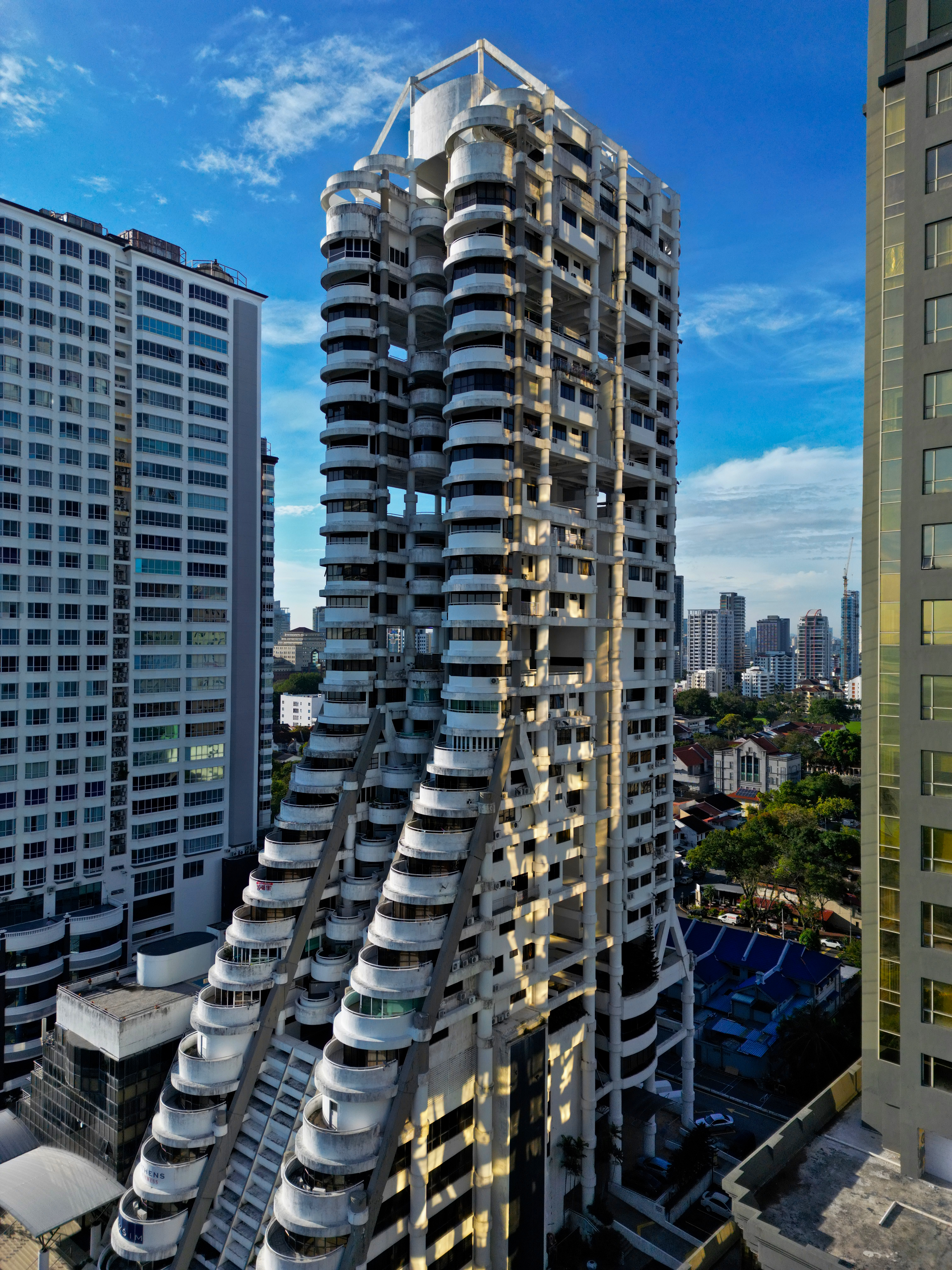
- Interactive map of the MBf Tower area

General information
- Type: Commercial offices
- Architectural style: Modernist
- Location: Northam Road, 10050 George Town, Penang, Malaysia, George Town, Penang, Malaysia
- Coordinates: 5.426834°N 100.321864°E
- Construction started: 1990
- Completed: 1994

Height
- Roof: 111 m (364 ft)
- Top floor: 31

Technical details
- Floor count: 31

Design and construction
- Architects: T.R. Hamzah & Yeang Sdn Bhd

MBf Tower is a commercial skyscraper within George Town in the Malaysian state of Penang. Located at Northam Road within the city's Central Business District (CBD), the 31-storey building, completed in 1994, is one of the oldest skyscrapers along the coastal street.

== History ==
Construction of the MBf Tower began in 1990 and was completed by 1994, making it one of the first skyscrapers to be built along Northam Road. The building originally housed the Penang branch of MBf Finance Berhad, which was later acquired by AmBank in 2001.

One of the tallest skyscrapers in Penang, the MBf Tower was built on the site of the demolished Northam Court, a 16-storey luxurious condominium project under construction which was demolished just before completion in 1980 when it began tilting and was at risk of collapse.

== See also ==
- List of tallest buildings in George Town
- Northam Road
