= Yeap Chor Ee =

Chinese businessman and philanthropist

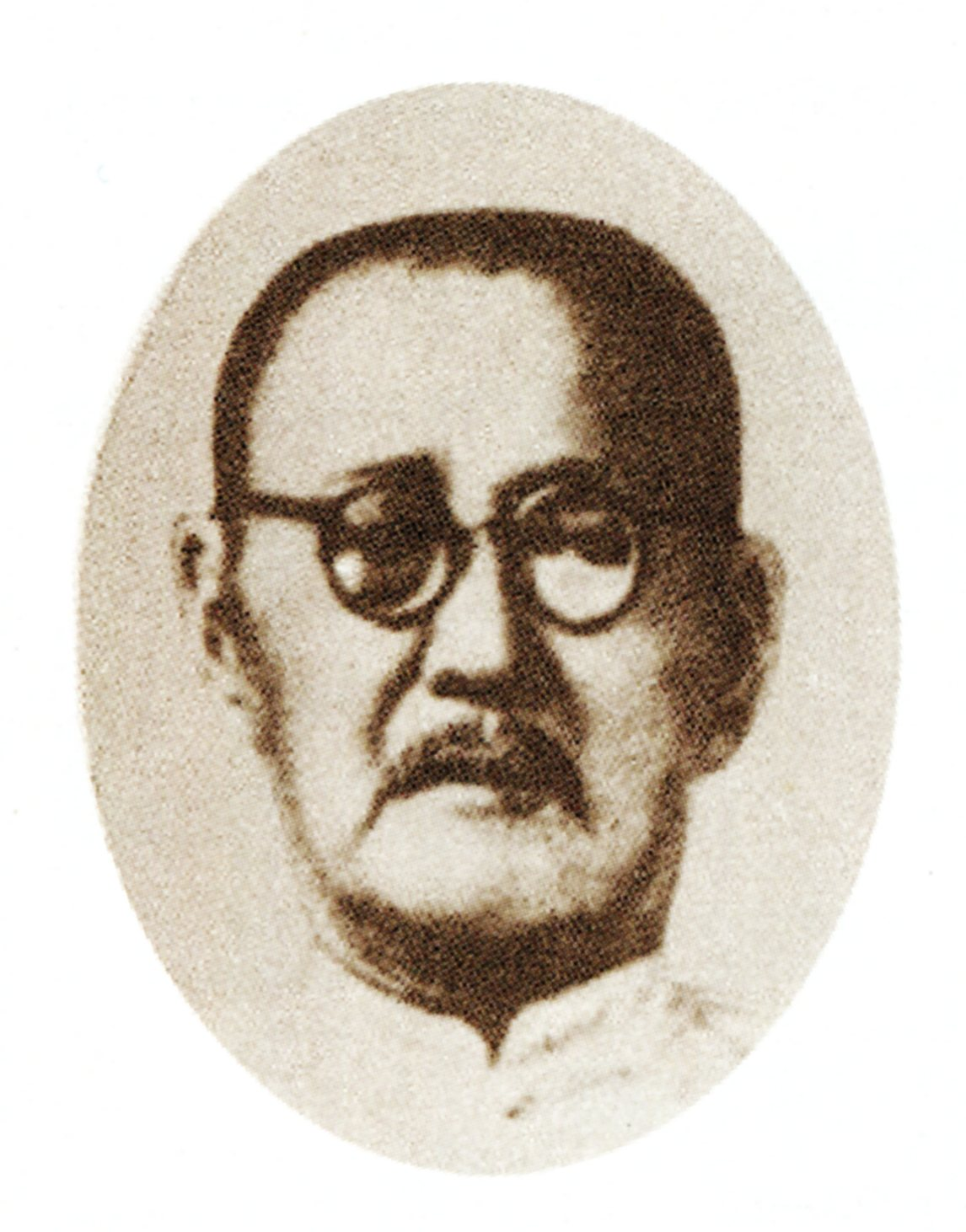
- Occupation(s): Trader, banker, philanthropist

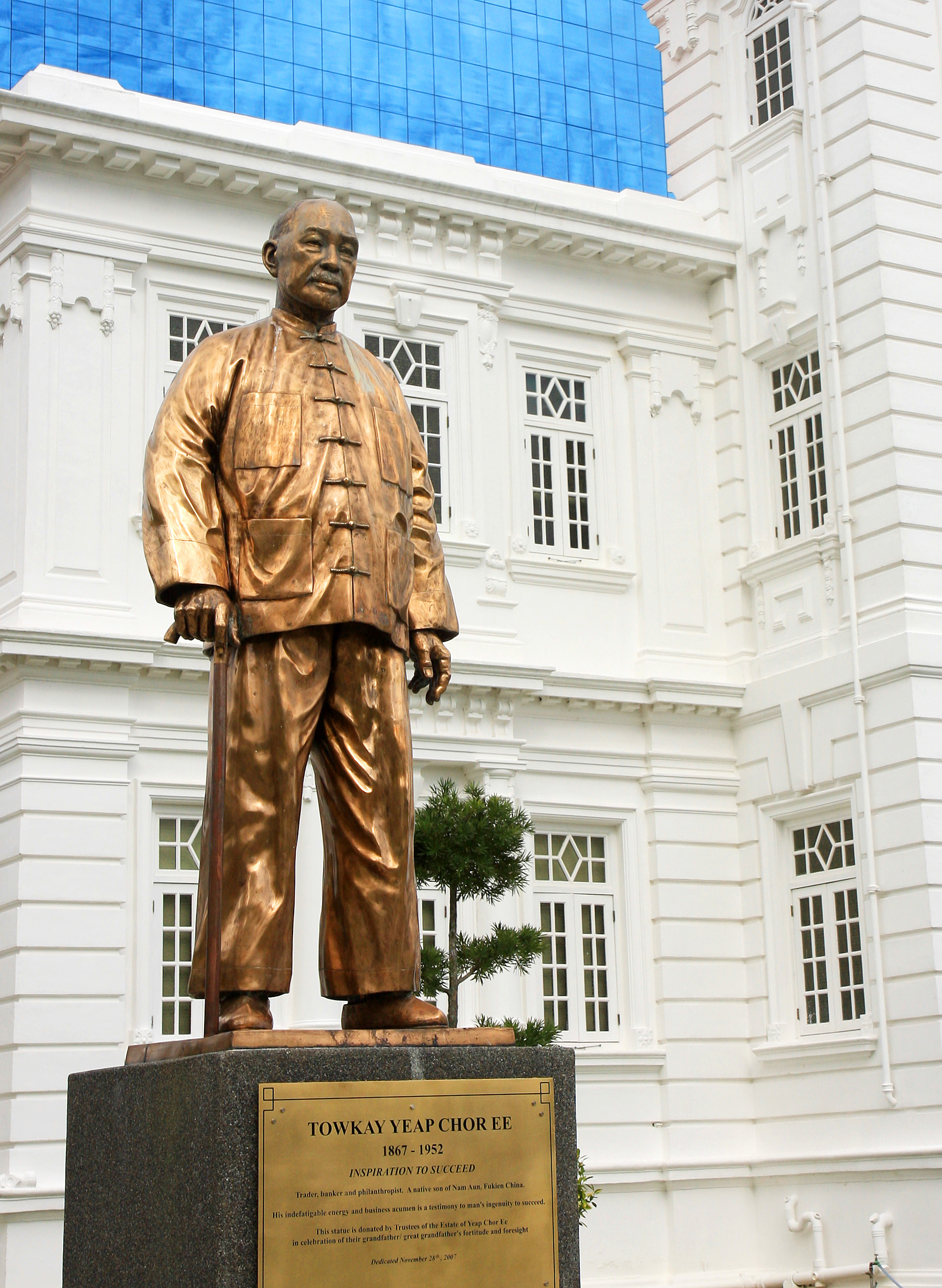

Yeap Chor Ee (葉祖意) was a businessman and philanthropist. He was born in the village of Nan'an, Fujian, China, in 1867. He came to Penang at the age of 17 in the 1880s virtually penniless, and found work as a barber. He rose to become the richest men in Penang. Over a course of thirty years, he built an empire with real banking, real estate and commodities trading activities. He founded the Ban Hin Lee Bank in 1918 and many other companies. Yeap Chor Ee remained the only individual who single-handedly funded the establishment of a bank in that era. He also became one of the State's leading philanthropists. Yeap died in 1952 at the age of 85. By then, he was known as "The Grand Old Man of Penang", praised for his "old-world courtesy, humility, generosity and integrity".

== Family ==
He had a wife in China, who remained in his ancestral home. He also married a local girl, Lee Cheng Kin, by whom he had two sons, Datuk Yeap Hock Hoe and Yeap Hock Hin. They lived in a mansion called ‘Homestead’ at No 54 Northam Road which was their family house. In 1942, his son Yeap Hock Hoe married Julie Phang who gave birth to a daughter, Angela Yeap (Yeap Poh Suat).

During the Japanese Occupation Datuk Yeap remarried to someone called Hooi Kum Chee, then still in her teens, who lived in Homestead. Although there is no evidence of Kum Chee's marriage, Yeap Chor Ee recognised her as Datuk Yeap's wife. She gave birth to three daughters and one son. During his marriage to Kum Chee and sometime in 1943, Datuk Yeap met Yam Kim Lian at the Wembley Arcade where he frequented regularly. Eventually, she became his secondary wife in 1944 and bore him two daughters and four sons. Kim Lian and her children lived at Selamat Lane whilst Datuk Yeap and Kum Chee continued to live with his parents in Homestead.

Kum Chee died in 1948 after an operation. She was still in her early twenties, leaving behind four young children, the eldest of whom was five years old and the youngest barely two years. Datuk Yeap was deeply grieved by her death. Some three years later, on 22 December 1951 Datuk Yeap married Kum Chee's younger sister Hooi Sooi Wan, then 20 years old. The marriage was conducted in Homestead according to Chinese rites and custom in the presence of Yeap Chor Ee and Lee Cheng Kin and others. In 1957 Datuk Yeap married another wife, Gan Chiew Heang, who gave birth to three daughters.

A Full List of Datuk Yeap Hock Hoe's wives:

- Ida Oei (Daughter of Chinese Indonesian Businessman, Oei Tiong Ham married in 1933), who divorced shortly after the birth of a son, Francis Yeap.
- Julie Phang (m. 1942), who later left Homestead and remarried.
- Hooi Kum Chee (m. ~ 1943), who died in 1948, after an operation;
- Yam Kim Lian (m. 1944), who lived at Selamat Lane with her children;
- Hooi Sooi Wan (m. 1951); who is Hooi Kum Chee's younger sister;
- Gan Chiew Heang (m. 1957).

A Full List of Yeap Hock Hin's wives:

- Teoh Phaik Kheng
- Lee Swee Ean, who died peacefully in 2021;

== Family museum ==
A private family gallery/museum in Penang has been opened - House of Yeap Chor Ee. The museum, traditionally known as the Kau Kheng Choo (Nine Houses), was originally the home of Yeap Chor Ee before Homestead. Yeap Leong Huat had opened it to celebrate the life and achievements of his grandfather. The gallery, located on Lebuh Penang, Penang, Malaysia, displays the collection from Homestead and Yeap Chor Ee's other interests.

A family tree is also displayed in the gallery, and other descendants of Yeap Chor Ee can add themselves to the tree by writing in. The current family tree, spanning three generations of the Yeap family, is included in the attached photo of this section.
