= Wawasan Open University =

Private university in Penang, Malaysia

- Universiti Terbuka Wawasan (Malay)
- Type: Private
- Established: 2006
- Affiliations: Asian Association of Open Universities (AAOU), ICDE
- Location: Georgetown, Penang, Malaysia
- Colours: Light Green, and Dark Green
- Website: www.wou.edu.my

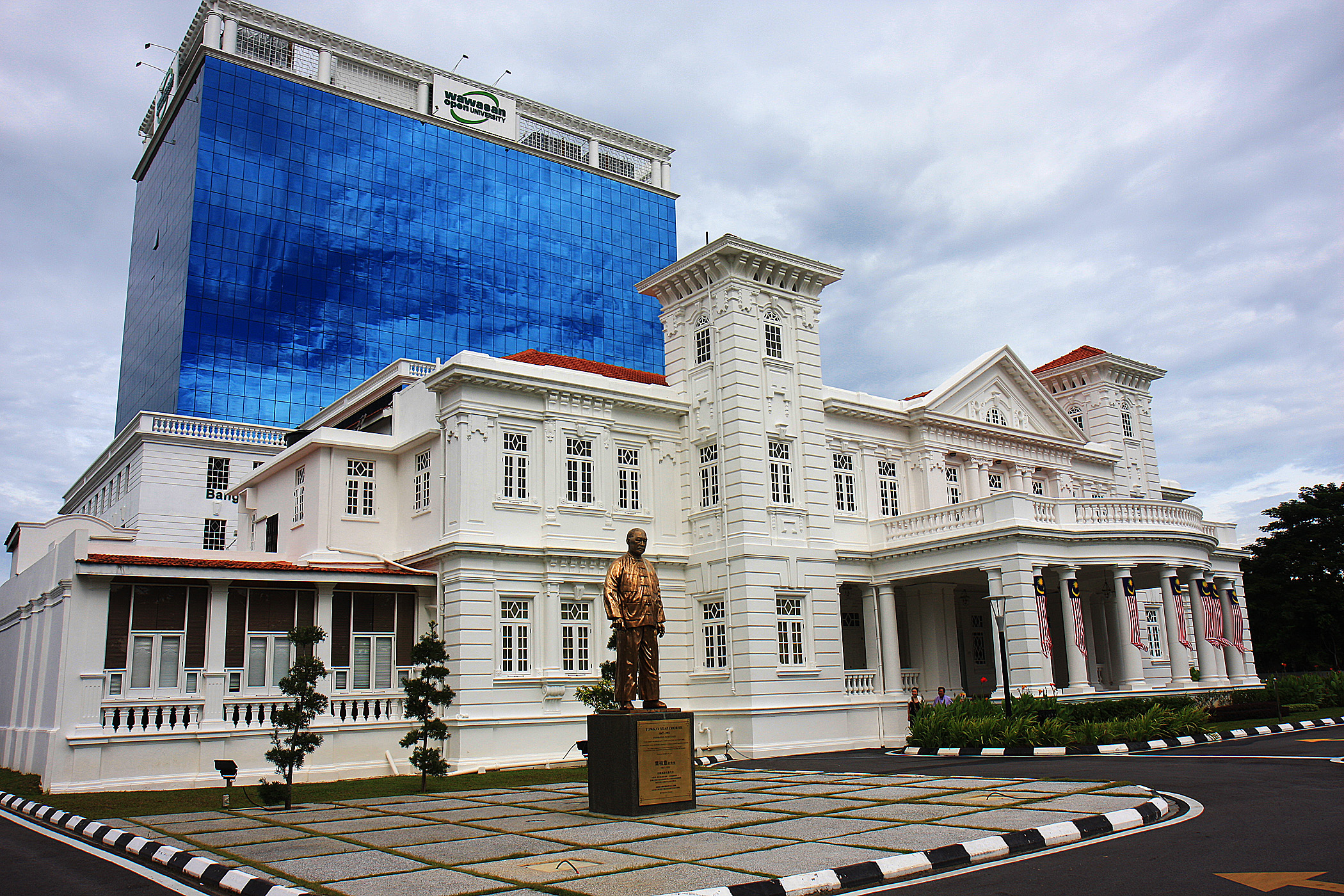
Wawasan Open University Main Campus in Penang, Malaysia

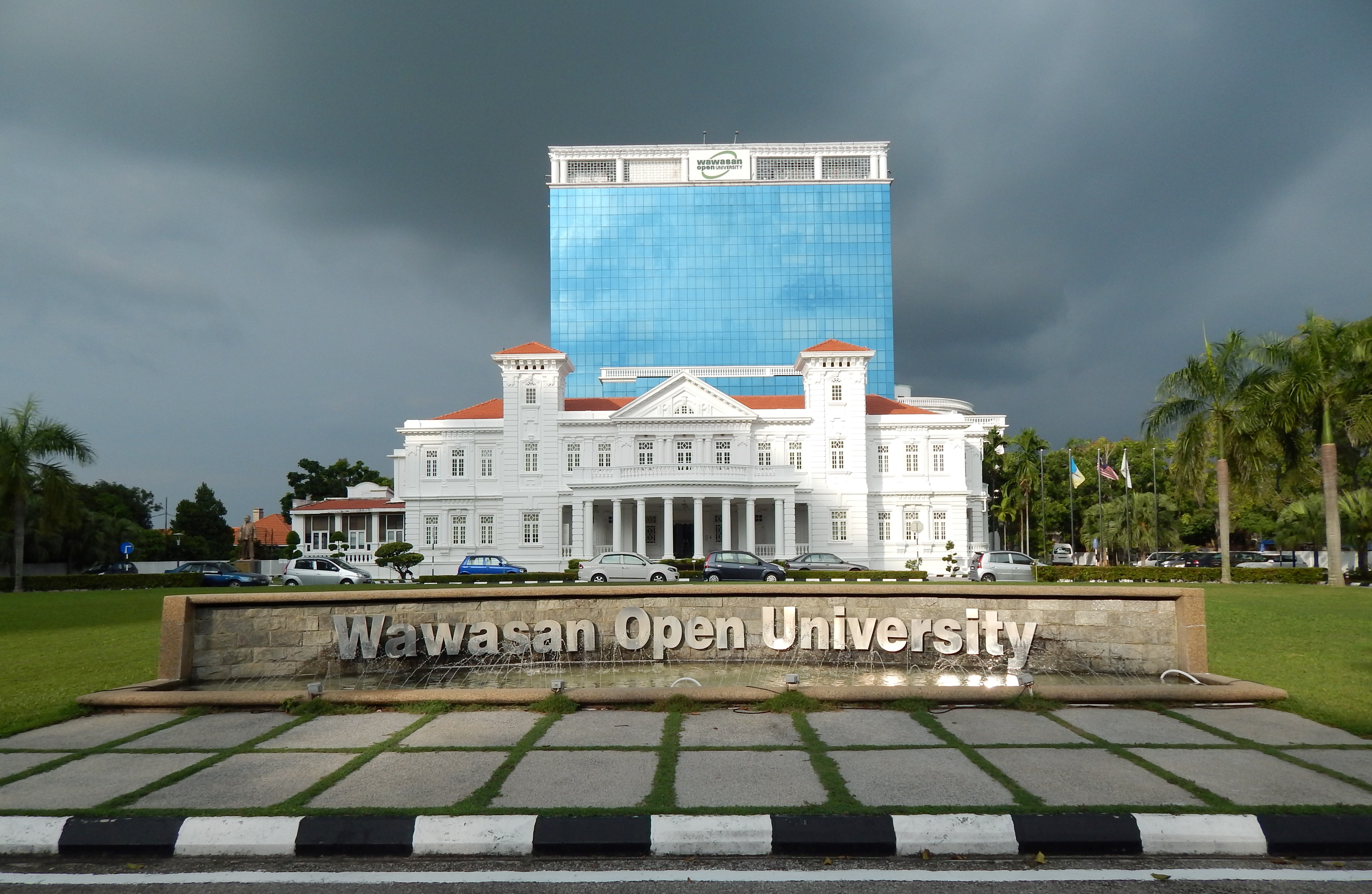
Wawasan Open University Main Campus in Penang, Malaysia

Wawasan Open University, abbreviated as WOU, is a private university located in Penang, Malaysia, that provides working adults with access to higher education via open distance learning (ODL).

It was established in 2006 and enrolled its first batch of students in 2007. In September 2013, WOU began to also offer full-time degree programmes to STPM school leavers and diploma holders at its Main Campus in Penang.

== Academic programmes and accreditation ==
All WOU programmes are accredited by the Malaysian Qualifications Agency (MQA) and approved by the Malaysian Ministry of Higher Education (MOHE). WOU achieved a Tier-5 or "Excellent" rating in the SETARA local university ranking exercise conducted by the MOE in 2011 and 2013.

== Campus ==
The university's main campus is located by the sea in the northeastern part of Penang Island, Malaysia. It consists of two buildings: the historic Homestead mansion and the modern 12-storey Al-Bukhary Building. Additionally, the city campus is situated in the heart of George Town, Penang. WOU also has regional centre in Johor Bahru, along with regional offices in Kuching, Ipoh and Kuala Lumpur, which provide support to distance learners in these cities and their surrounding areas.
