= 8 Gurney =

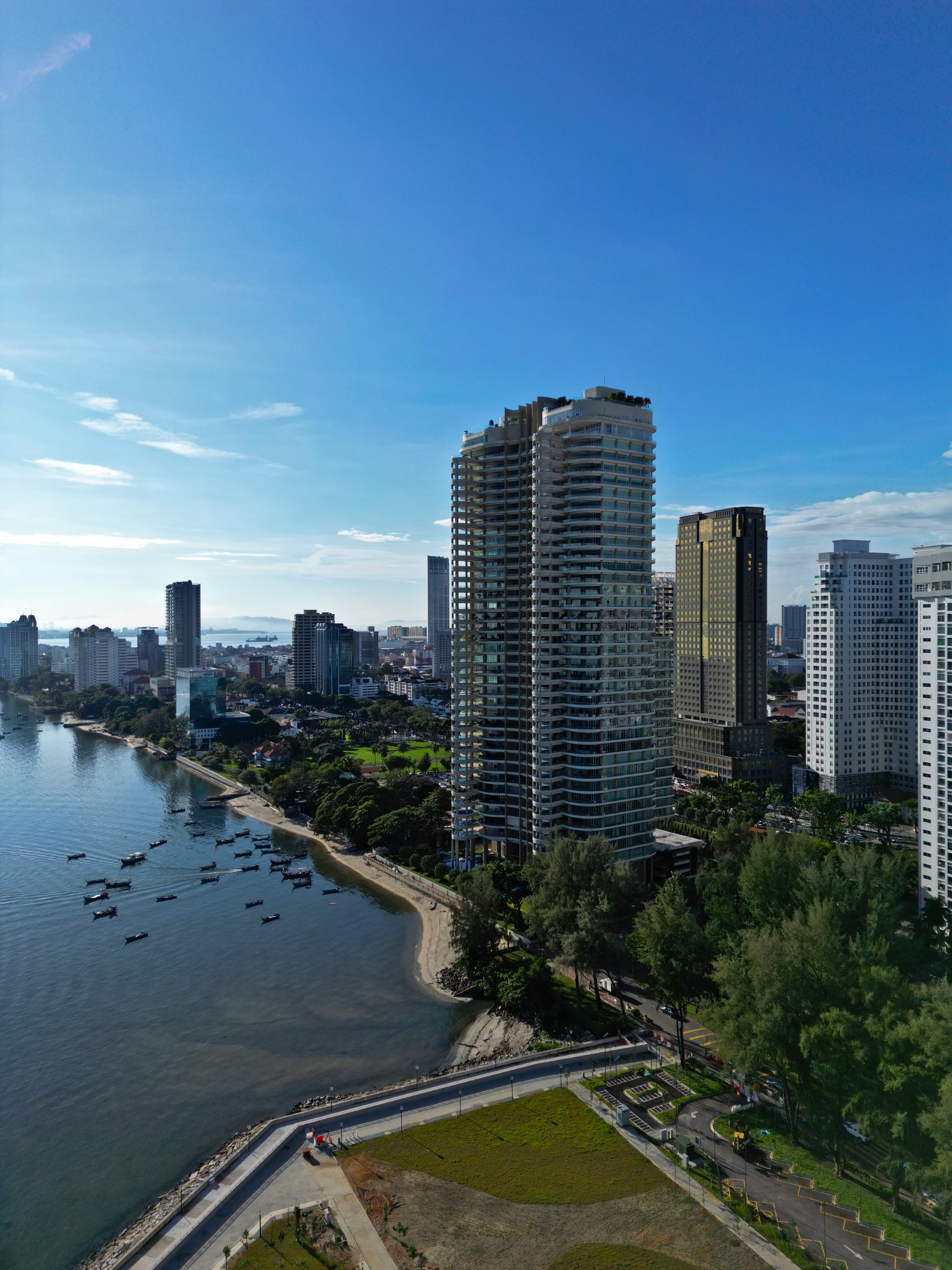

General information
- Type: Condominium
- Location: Gurney Drive, 10250 George Town, Penang, Malaysia, George Town, Penang, Malaysia
- Coordinates: 5.428842°N 100.321242°E
- Owner: CA+ Associates

Height
- Roof: 150 m (490 ft)
- Top floor: 38

Technical details
- Floor count: 38

8 Gurney is a 38-storey condominium in George Town within the Malaysian state of Penang. Located at Gurney Drive within the city's Central Business District (CBD), it stands at a height of 150 m (490 ft), making it one of the tallest skyscrapers along the coastal road. Completed in 2013, it was built by Pulau Ceria, a subsidiary of CA+ Associates.

== See also ==
- List of tallest buildings in George Town
- Gurney Drive
