= Ascott Gurney Penang =

Commercial tower in George Town, Penang, Malaysia

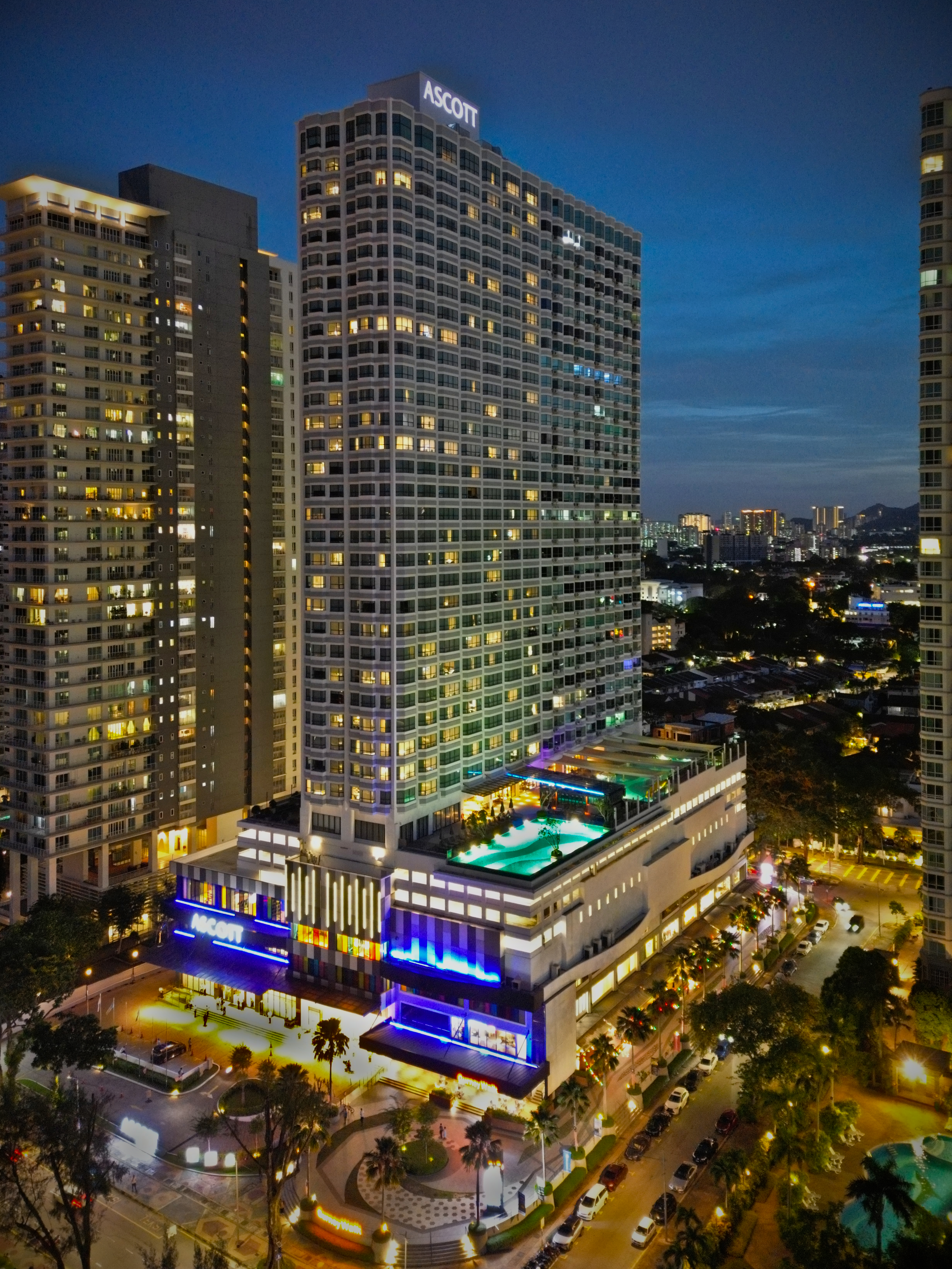

General information
- Location: Gurney Drive, 10250 George Town, Penang, Malaysia, George Town, Penang, Malaysia

Ascott Gurney Penang is a 37-storey commercial skyscraper in George Town within the Malaysian state of Penang. Located at Gurney Drive within the city's Central Business District (CBD), it is home to the first Ascott serviced apartment in the island city. The property also consists of a retail podium and offices, including the Penang branch of Al-Rajhi Bank.

Gurney Walk

Gurney Walk, a three-story lifestyle commercial area, features various retail shops, cafes, and restaurants alongside a spa and fitness facilities located at the podium of the hotel. It opened in March 2022 and there are some international brands like The Coffee Bean & Tea Leaf and Subway to local favorites like Yin Sourdough, Four Spoons and Cueva at the area.

== See also ==
- List of tallest buildings in George Town
- Gurney Drive
