= Merchant Hotel, Penang =

Hotel in George Town, Penang, Malaysia

Merchant Hotel
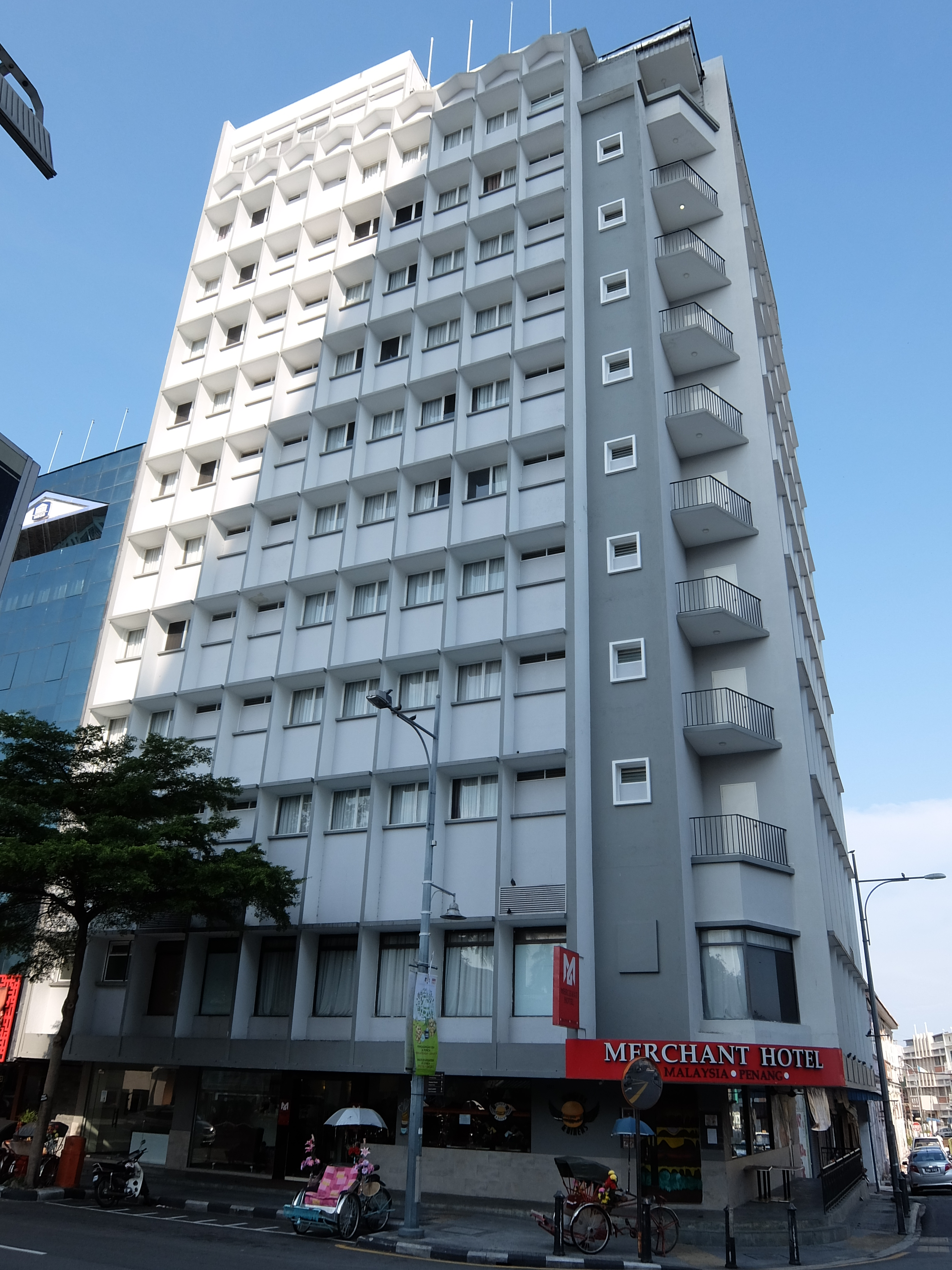
- Former names: Hotel Ambassador

General information
- Address: 55, Penang Road, 10000 George Town, Penang, Malaysia
- Town or city: George Town, Penang
- Country: Malaysia
- Coordinates: 5.4211°N 100.3335°E
- Opened: 1966

Height
- Top floor: 12

Technical details
- Floor count: 12

Merchant Hotel is a hotel within George Town in the Malaysian state of Penang. Located at Penang Road within the city's Central Business District (CBD), the 12-storey building was originally opened as Hotel Ambassador in 1966. It was once the tallest building in the city, but in 1991 the hotel saw a change in ownership as a result of legal action taken against its original owner.

== History ==
As early as 1962, The Straits Times reported on the construction of a new 11-storey building at the junction of Penang Road and Muntri Street. This building was intended to house Hotel Ambassador and ultimately contained 80 rooms spread across 12 floors. In 1966, the then federal Minister of Commerce and Industry Lim Swee Aun officiated the hotel's launch. Upon completion, Hotel Ambassador surpassed the Tuanku Syed Putra Building as the tallest in George Town, a status it held until the completion of the Rifle Range Flats in 1969.

In 1989, Hotel Ambassador was auctioned to Seapower, a Singapore-based private firm, for M$6 million (ringgit). However, the hotel management had incurred M$756,000 in rental arrears, leading to legal action by the hotel's original owners, Saw Consolidated Securities, to recover its moveable assets. This resulted in a court order to seal the hotel in 1990.

Despite an initial application by Seapower to regain possession of the building being rejected by the Penang High Court, a subsequent appeal led to the Supreme Court ruling in favour of handing over the hotel to Seapower in 1991. The hotel was subsequently rebranded as Merchant Hotel. Prior to renovations in 2015, the Lonely Planet described the hotel as having a "rather dark, spooky" interior.
