= Millennium Tower (Penang) =

Residential building in Northeast, Penang, Malaysia

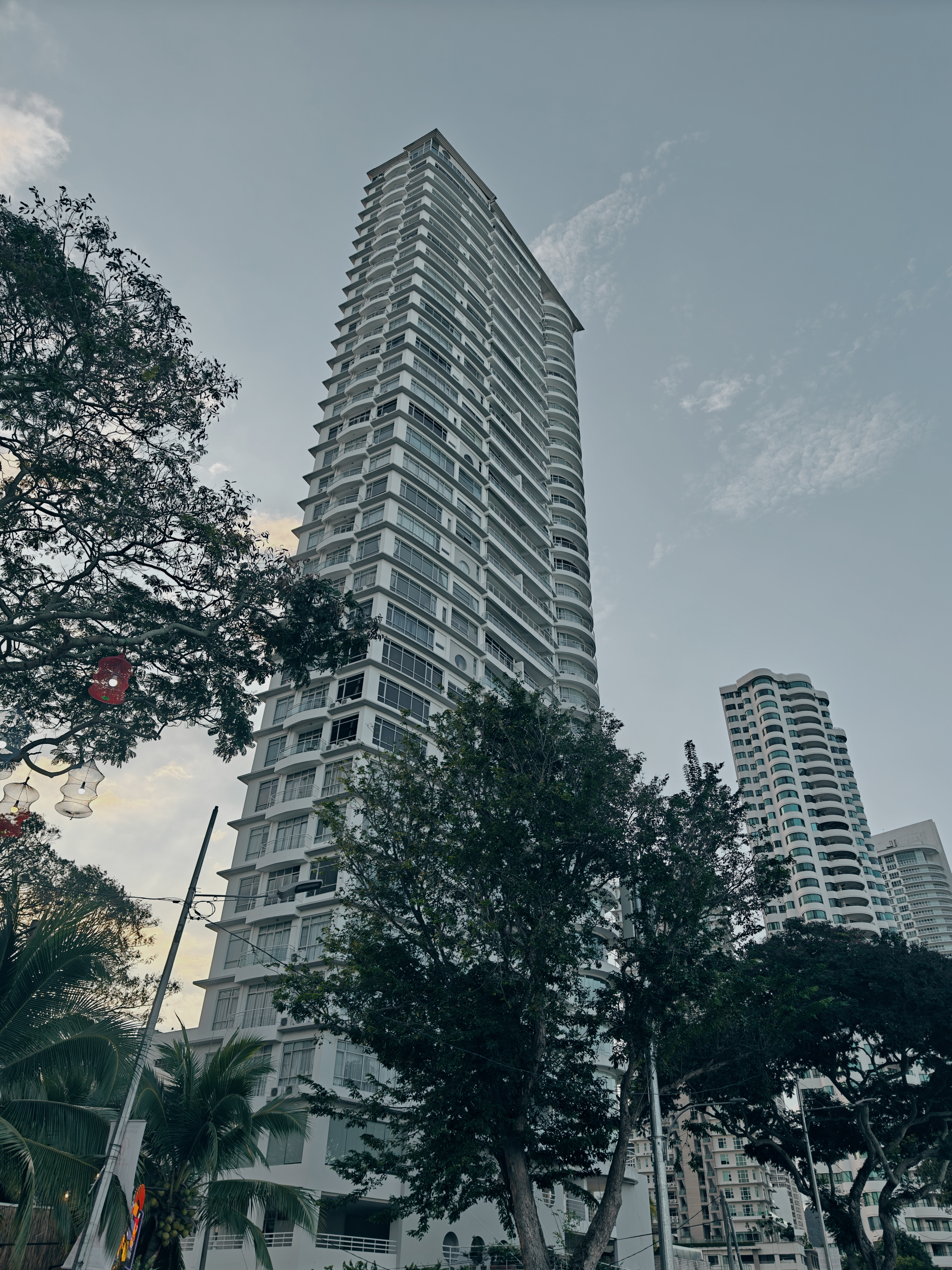
- Interactive map of the Millennium Tower area

General information
- Type: Condominium
- Location: Gurney Drive, 10250 George Town, Penang, Malaysia, George Town, Penang, Malaysia
- Coordinates: 5.434705°N 100.314815°E
- Completed: 2005

Height
- Roof: A: 138 m (453 ft)
- Top floor: 35

Technical details
- Floor count: 35

The Millennium Tower is a 35-storey condominium within the city of George Town in Penang, Malaysia. Located at Gurney Drive within the city's Central Business District (CBD), the skyscraper was completed in 2005 and has a height of 138 m (453 ft). A low density development, the condominium contains only 20 residential units within its 35 floors.

== See also ==
- List of tallest buildings in George Town
- Gurney Drive
