= Kelawei Road, George Town =

Road in the Malaysian state of Penang

Kelawei Road
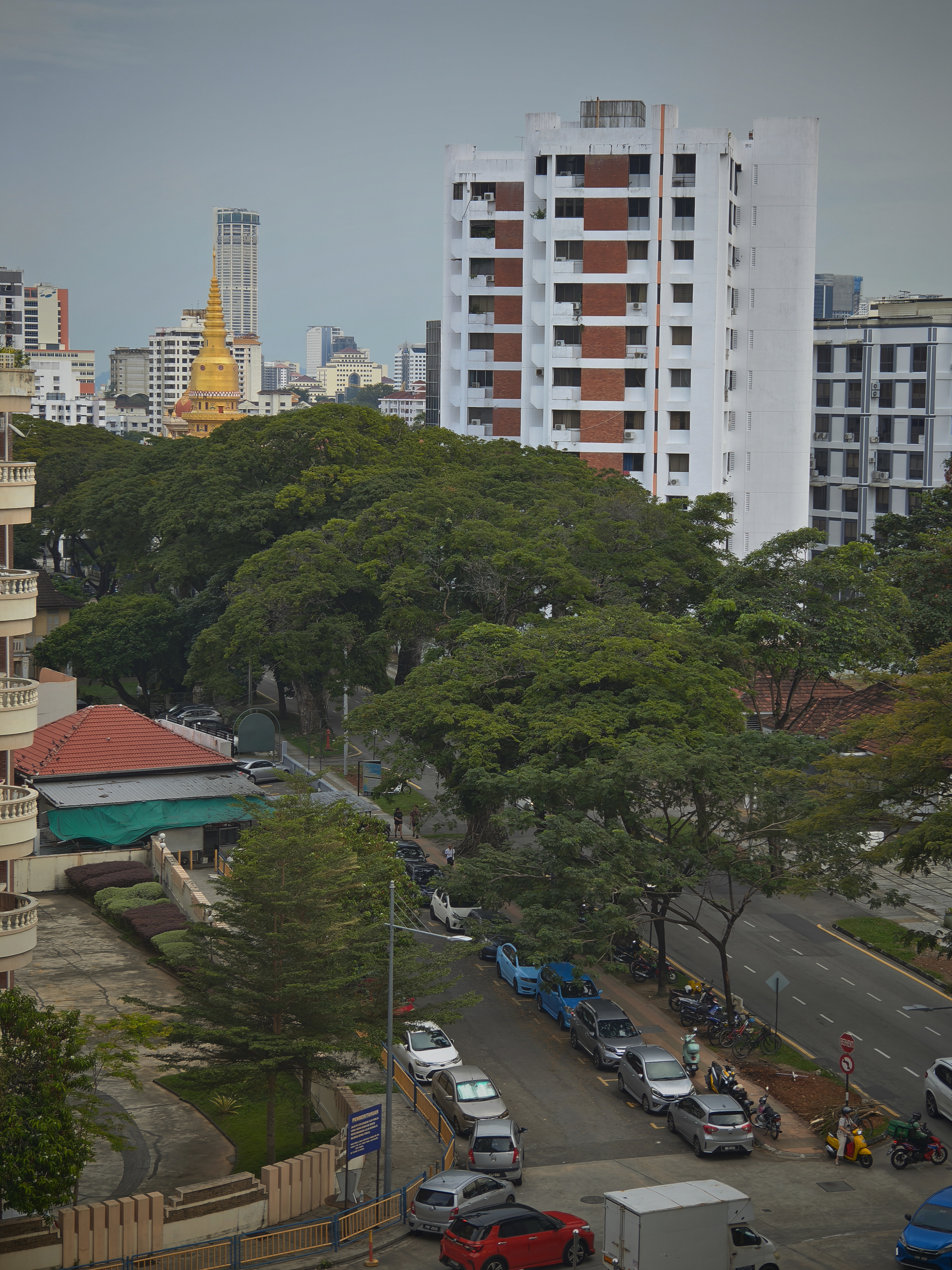
- Native name: Malay: Jalan Kelawei; Chinese: 加拉歪路
- Maintained by: Penang Island City Council
- Location: George Town
- Coordinates: 5.435208°N 100.30969°E
- West end: Gurney Drive; Jalan Bagan Jermal; Jalan Tanjong Tokong
- East end: Gurney Drive; Northam Road; Jalan Pangkor
- JALAN KELAWEI Kelawei Rd10250 P. PINANG

Kelawei Road is a major thoroughfare in the city of George Town within the Malaysian state of Penang. It is one of the main roads leading out of the city centre towards the suburb of Tanjong Tokong. This leafy road runs just behind Gurney Drive, passing by a number of well-known landmarks and shopping malls; the high-rises of Gurney Drive also line the northern side of Kelawei Road.

As with Burmah Road, Kelawei Road passes through the suburb of Pulau Tikus, thus it has witnessed significant Eurasian, Thai and Burmese influences. A Eurasian community still resides along Kelawei Road to this day, forming the Penang Eurasian Association.

== Etymology ==
There are conflicting accounts on how Kelawei Road got its name. Kelawei Road was purportedly named after the first river estuary west of George Town, which was then named 'Kuala Awal'.

Another account stated that Kelawei Road was named after a Malay settlement that once existed at the road, and that the term 'Kelawai' actually referred to the roots of Myxopyrum nervosum, also known as 'pokok kelawai' in Malay. The Malay fishing village was, in turn, named 'Tanjong Kelawai', which gradually evolved into the current name of the road, Jalan Kelawei.

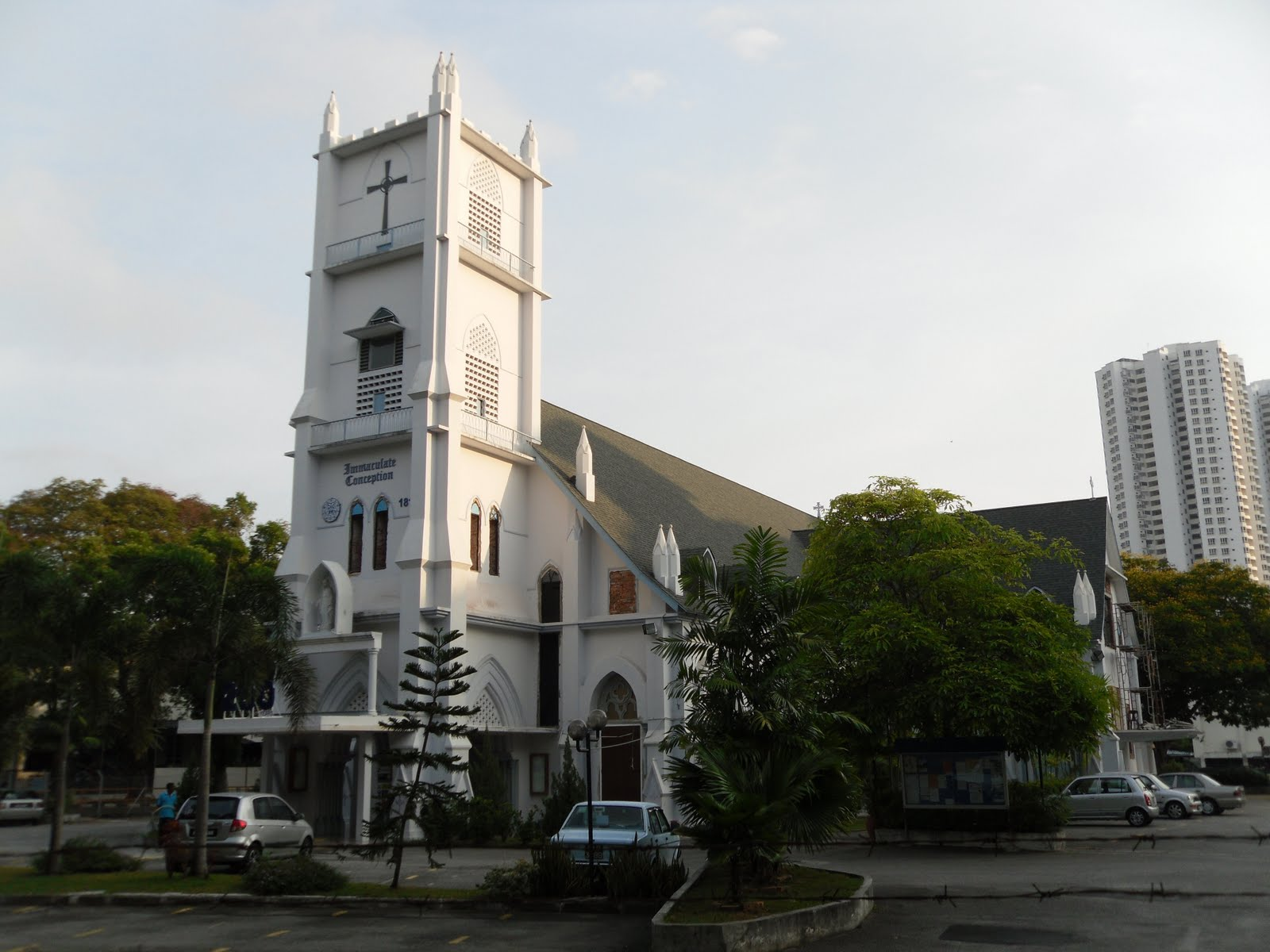
The Church of the Immaculate Conception was built on a piece of land bounded by Kelawei Road to the north and Burmah Road to the south.

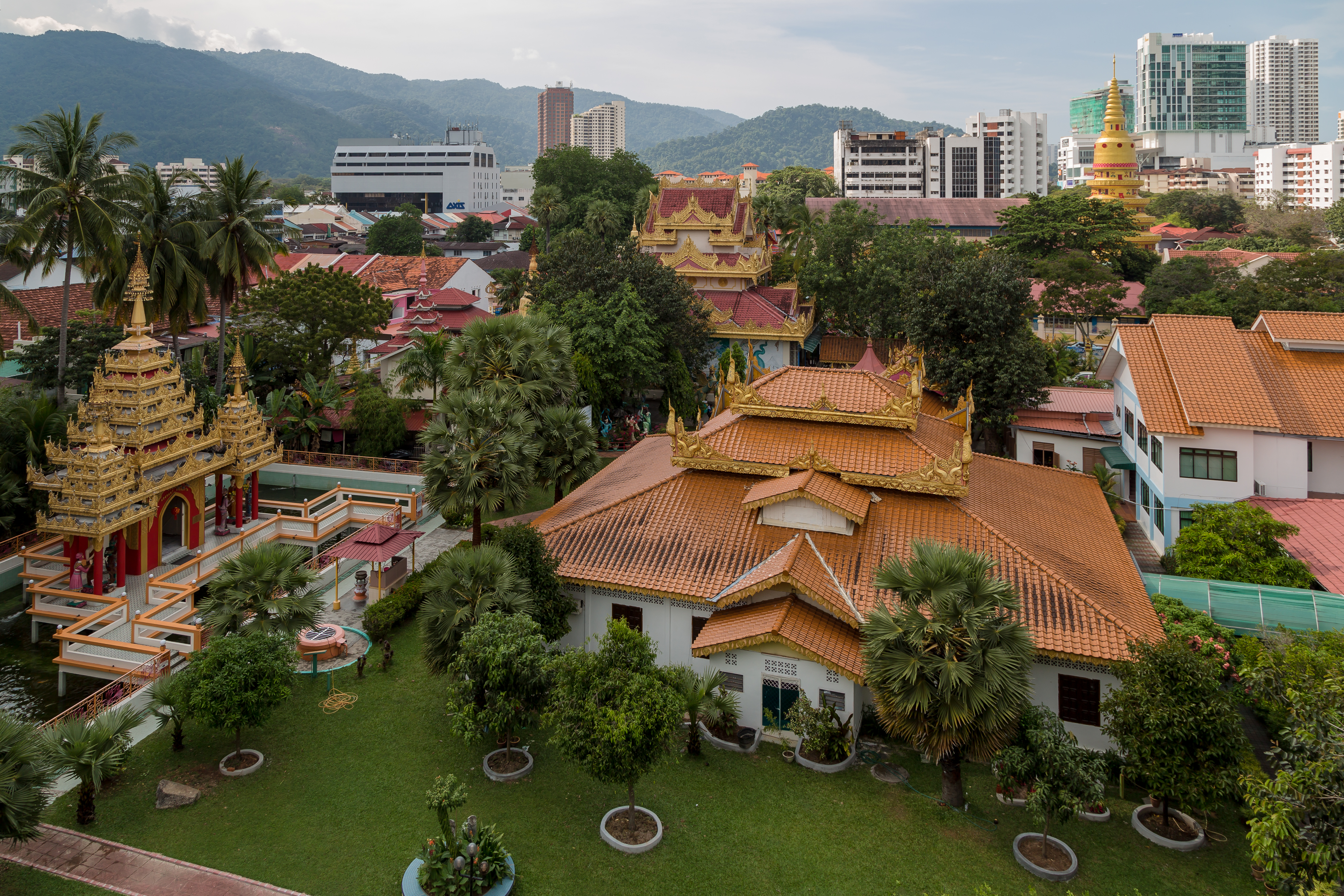
Dhammikarama Burmese Temple

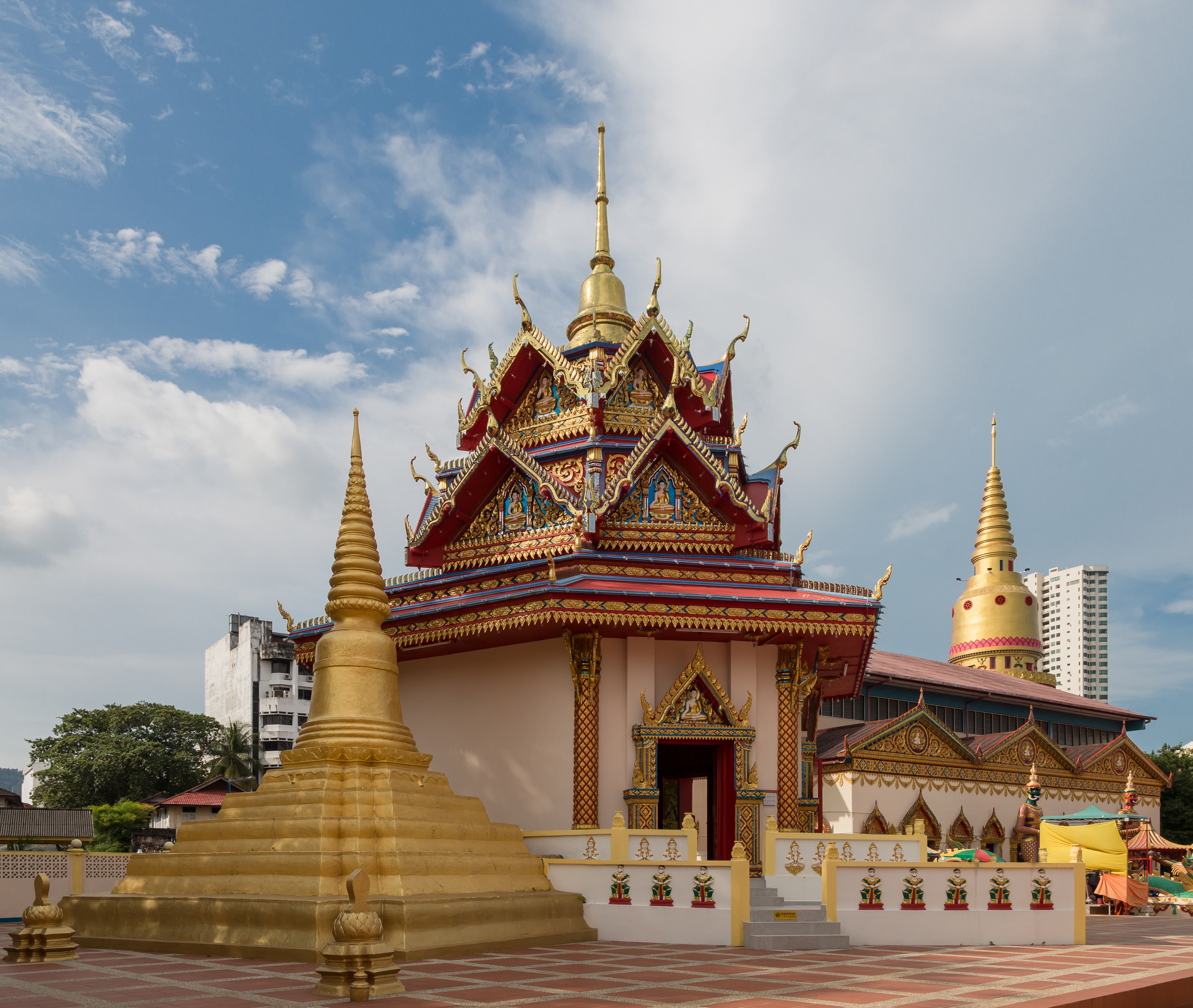
Wat Chaiyamangkalaram

== History ==
Kelawei Road has been populated by Burmese, Eurasian and Thai communities throughout its history. In particular, the mainly Catholic Eurasians built the Church of the Immaculate Conception, as well as the Catholic Cemetery along Kelawei Road. The College General, a training institution for Catholic missionaries, also once stood along the road, before being relocated to Tanjung Bungah.

Meanwhile, two Buddhist temples along Kelawei Road serve as reminders of the Thai and Burmese presence along the road. The Dhammikarama Burmese Temple was established by ethnic Burmese who had moved into the area in the late 18th century, with the temple being built in 1803. The Thais would later build Wat Chayamangkalaram on land donated to the Thai community by Queen Victoria in 1845.

Up until the 1930s, Kelawei Road was the coastal road that stretched along George Town's northern shoreline. Gurney Drive only came into existence with the completion of land reclamation works in the 1930s.

Today, the high-rises of Gurney Drive also have their rear entrances along Kelawei Road. The road has been made a one-way road since 2013.

== Landmarks ==
- Church of the Immaculate Conception
- Wat Chaiyamangkalaram
- Dhammikarama Burmese Temple

== Shopping centres ==
- Gurney Plaza
- Gurney Paragon

== Hotels ==
- G Hotel Kelawai
- Good Hope Hotel

== See also ==
- List of roads in George Town
