= Sunrise Tower =

Sunrise Tower may refer to:

- Sunrise Tower, Penang, a high building in George Town, Malaysia
- Sunrise Tower (Zurich), a high building in Zurich, Switzerland
