= Rifle Range, Penang =

Rifle Range Padang Tembak
- Neighbourhood of George Town
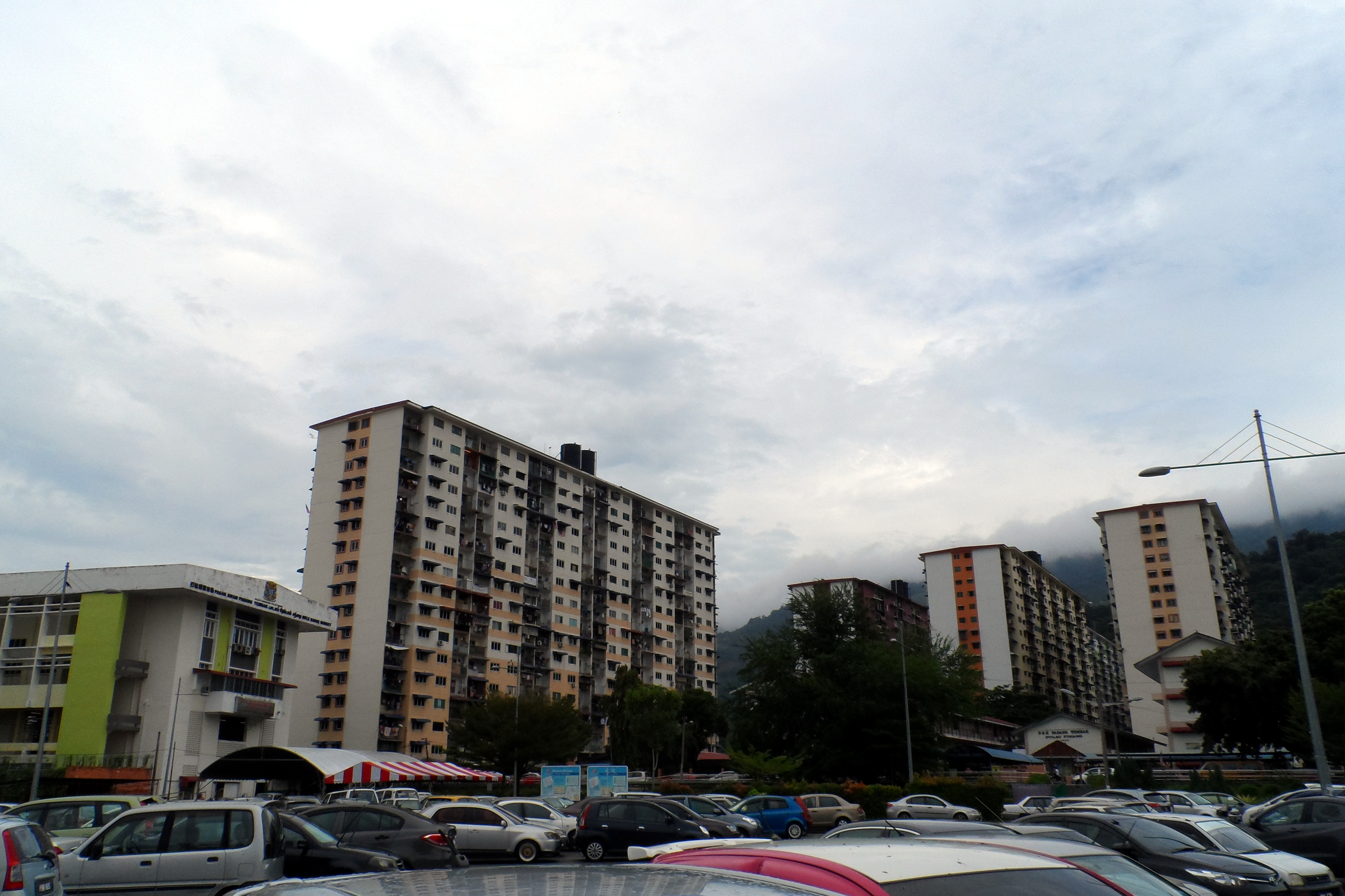

- Location within George Town in Penang
- Coordinates: 5°24′38″N 100°17′26″E
- Country: Malaysia
- State: Penang
- City: George Town
- District: Northeast
- Founded: 1969
- Time zone: UTC+8 (MST)
  - Summer (DST): Not observed
- Postal code: 114xx to 115xx

Rifle Range is a residential neighbourhood within the city of George Town in the Malaysian state of Penang. Located 4.4 km (2.7 mi) west of the city centre, the area was once home to a shooting range used by the British Army. The Malaysian federal government constructed nine blocks of low-cost public housing at the area in 1969, making them the first residential high-rises in Penang. Until 1977, the Rifle Range flats were considered the tallest buildings in George Town.

== Etymology ==
Rifle Range was so named as the area was once used as a shooting range by the British Army and local police.

== History ==
Rifle Range, which was used by the military and the police as a shooting range during the British colonial era, was also the site where victims of the Imperial Japanese Army's Sook Ching massacres were buried. During World War II, when Penang was under Japanese occupation, thousands of ethnic Chinese were brutally executed by the Japanese authorities and were buried in mass graves throughout Penang, including at Rifle Range. The remains of the victims would only be uncovered in the 1960s when the construction of the Rifle Range flats was underway.

In 1964, the Malaysian federal government approved a pilot project to construct prefabricated high-rise housing at Rifle Range. Six blocks of 17-storey flats and three blocks of 18-storey flats, which cumulatively contain 3,699 residential units and 66 shop lots, were to be assembled on-site using prefabricated concrete blocks. The nine blocks were constructed by the Housing Trust Federation and were complete by 1969. The Rifle Range flats became the tallest buildings in George Town until the completion of Sunrise Tower in 1977. All nine structures were eventually acquired by the Penang state government from the federal government in 1972.

== Transportation ==
The major thoroughfares within the neighbourhood are Boundary Road and Rifle Range Road. In addition, Rapid Penang bus routes 201, 202 and 204 include stops within Rifle Range.

== Education ==
The neighbourhood is served by a single primary school.

- SRK Padang Tembak

== See also ==
- Ayer Itam
