= Gurney Drive, George Town =

Road in the Malaysian state of Penang

Gurney Drive
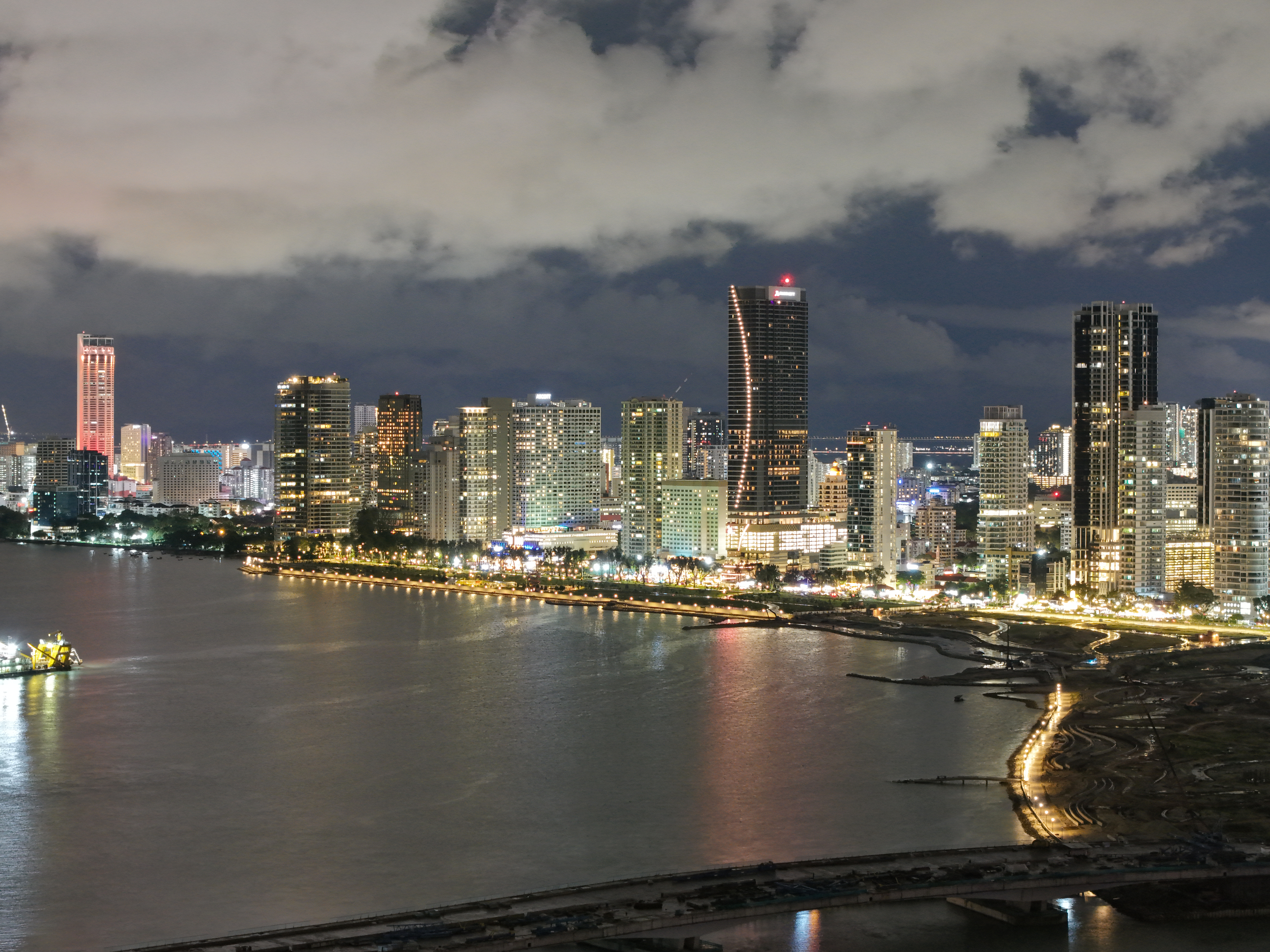
- Native name: Malay: Persiaran Gurney
- Maintained by: Penang Island City Council
- Location: George Town
- Coordinates: 5.436564°N 100.312556°E
- West end: Kelawei Road; Jalan Bagan Jermal; Jalan Tanjong Tokong
- East end: Northam Road; Kelawei Road; Jalan Pangkor

Construction
- Inauguration: 1934
- PERSIARAN GURNEY Gurney Drive10250 P. PINANG

Gurney Drive is a popular seafront promenade within the city of George Town in the Malaysian state of Penang. The road is also famous for the street cuisine at the seafront's hawker centre and has been listed as one of the 25 best streets worldwide to visit by the Australian travel magazine, The Traveler. In addition, Gurney Drive has become part of George Town's Central Business District due to the mushrooming of commercial properties and shopping malls.

Previously known as the New Coast Road, it was completed in 1936 along what was then known as the North Beach and renamed in 1952 after Sir Henry Gurney, British High Commissioner in Malaya (1950–1951), who was assassinated by the guerrillas of the Malayan Communist Party during the Malayan Emergency.

Over the years, the beaches along Gurney Drive have largely been lost to coastal erosion. A land reclamation project at Seri Tanjong Pinang has reversed the erosion, leading to the accretion of silt and mud off Gurney Drive. Mangrove saplings have sprouted in the mud, which is now frequented by egrets and other birds as well as mudskippers.

The shoreline off Gurney Drive has been reclaimed for the construction of a public recreational park named Gurney Bay. The first phase of Gurney Bay was opened in 2024.

== History ==
Dragon boat racing in 1986

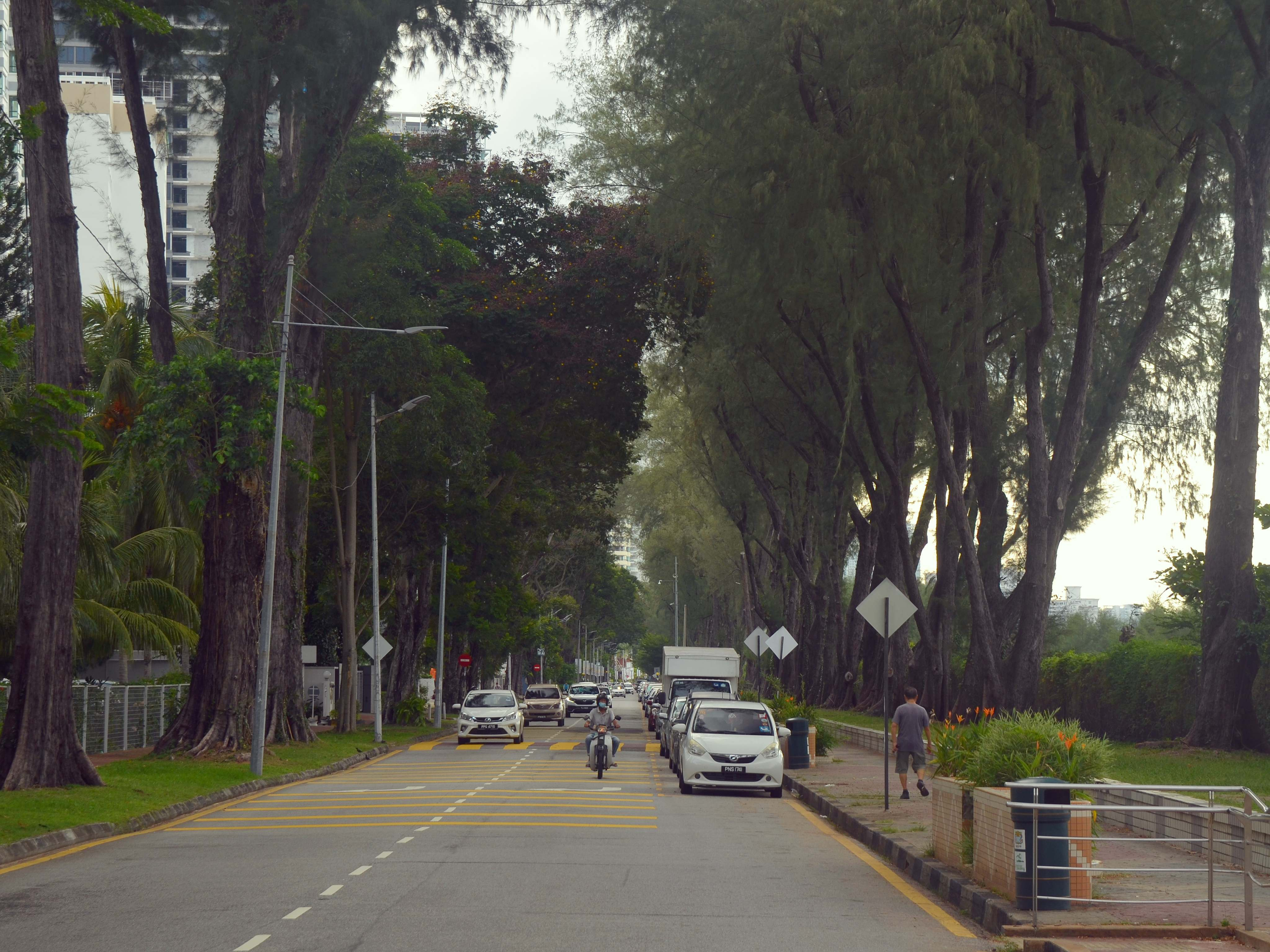
Eastern end with casuarina

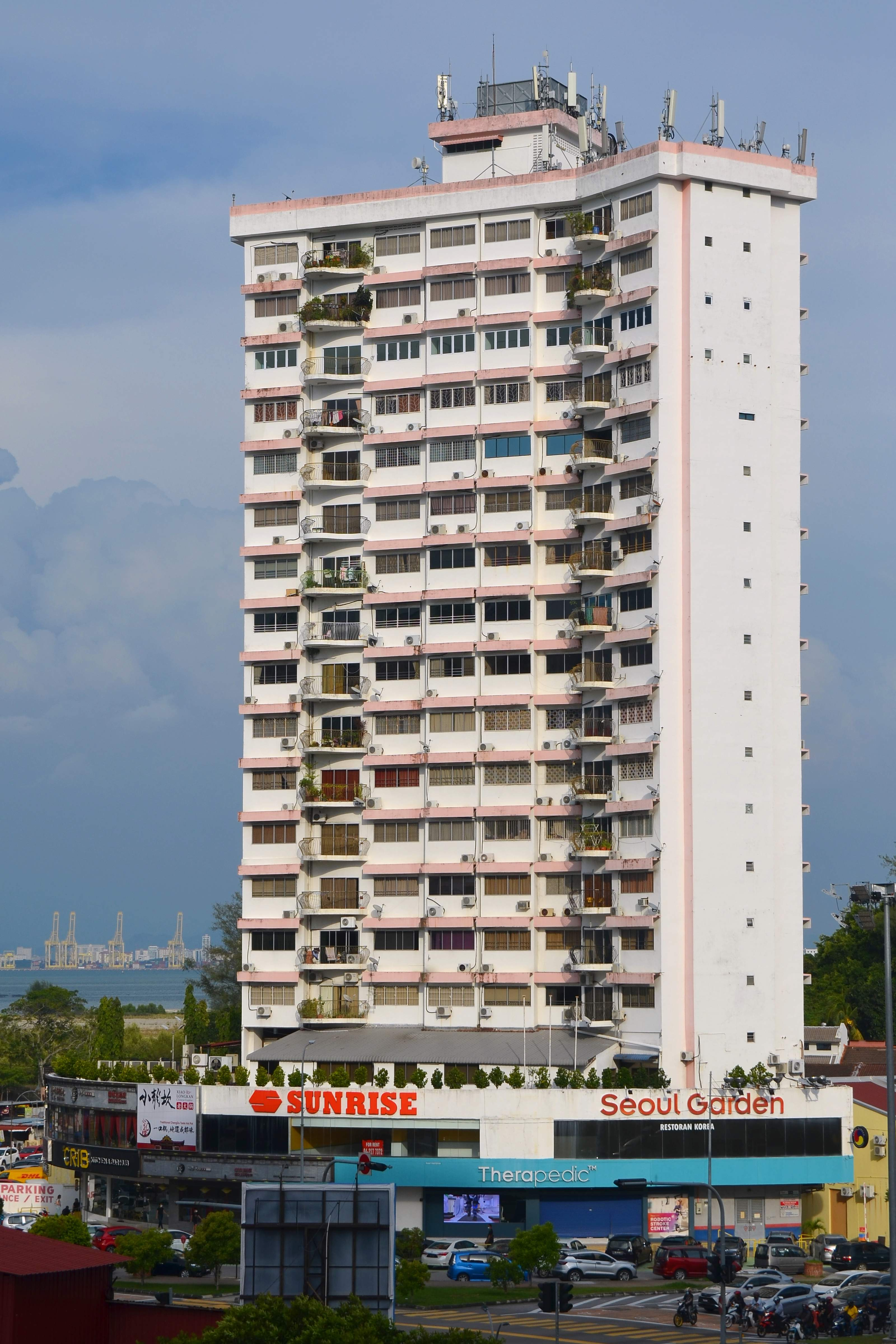
Sunrise Tower, Penang's tallest building before Komtar

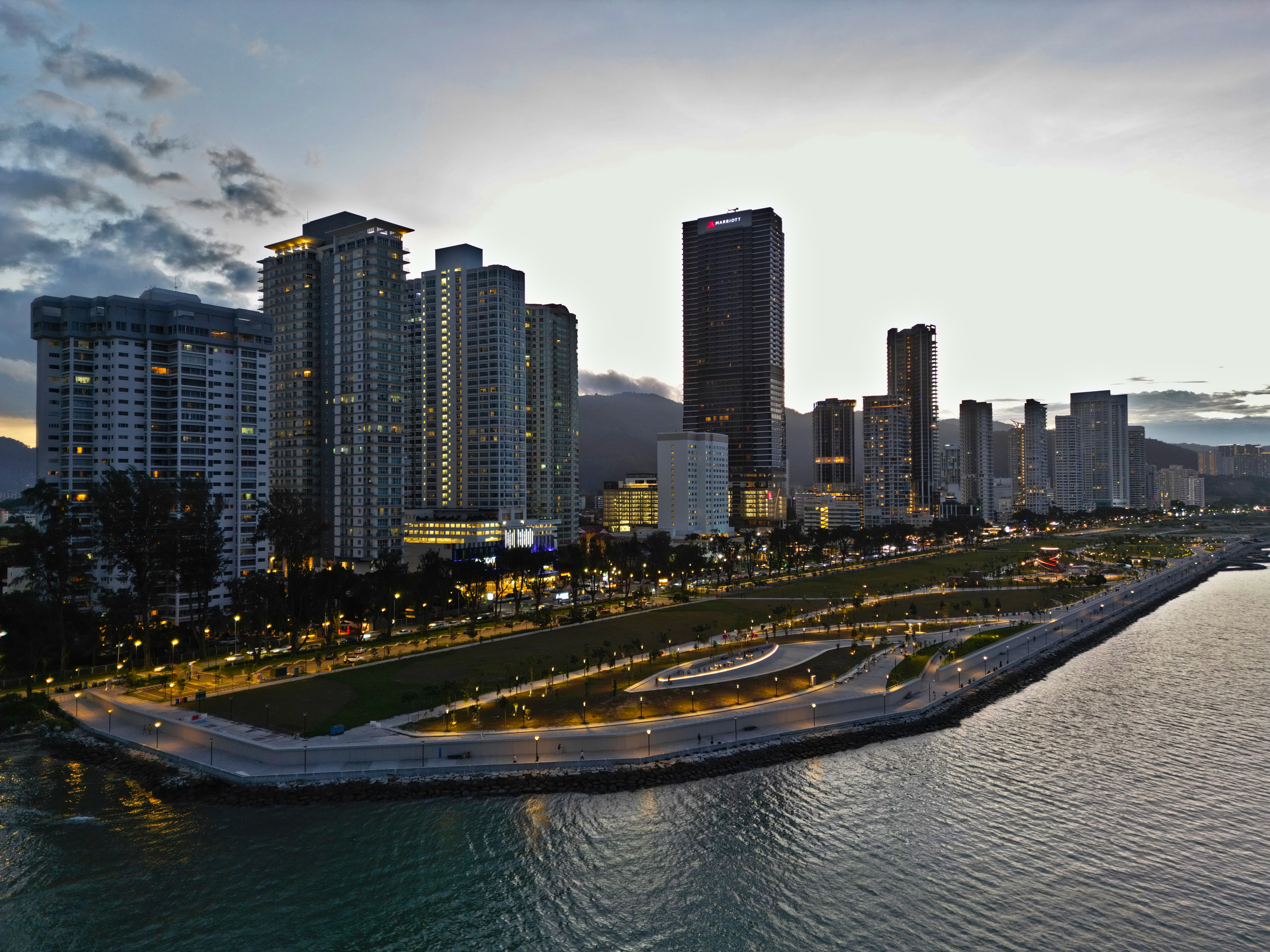
Gurney Bay is a public park created from reclaimed land off Gurney Drive.

Gurney Drive sits on reclaimed land created off Teluk Ayer Rajah, the bay that once existed between George Town and Tanjung Tokong. The intention to build a coastal road was already planned as early as 1930 as an extension of Northam Road (now Jalan Sultan Ahmad Shah). The first 510 yards (470 m) of Gurney Drive was completed in 1934, and at that time, it was simply named "North Beach".

Gurney Drive was initially named as New Coast Road. It was then renamed Gurney Drive in honour of Sir Henry Gurney, the British High Commissioner in Malaya who had been assassinated by communist guerrillas in Pahang in 1951.

However, a few years later, a debate erupted over the renaming of Gurney Drive. It was proposed that, with the independence of Malaya imminent at the time, Gurney Drive should be renamed Merdeka Drive. To compensate for the renaming of the road, a bust of the late Sir Henry Gurney was to be constructed. The Municipal Commissioners who opposed the renaming of Gurney Drive then wrote directly to Gurney's wife, who was said to have taken 'the change very bravely and even offered to help with regard to the statue or bust'. A sculptor in London, David McFall, offered to create the bust for $4,500.

When the recommendation for the provision of $6,000 for the bust was reviewed by the Finance Committee of the Municipal Council, it was eventually decided to not only to defer the provision of the bust but also that the drive should continue to be called Gurney Drive.

In 1962, a section of Gurney Drive was planted with casuarina trees. A councillor subsequently suggested that the City Council should consider renaming Gurney Drive into "Casuarina Drive" or "Casuarina Beach". The suggestion was never implemented, and today, the section where the casuarina trees were planted remains a distinct, leafy part of the seaside promenade.

Gurney Drive was once a sandy beach where people could collect seashells i.e. siput remis or small mussels which were abundant back then. The seawater was so clean and pollution-free that it became a venue for dragon boat races from the 1960s to 1980s. Back then people would swim in the sea and fishermen would return to the beach with their catches, especially for fishes and king crabs along the shore.

However, such excitement of these events and the clear water is much lost now. The Seri Tanjung Pinang land reclamation project at nearby Tanjung Tokong had led to an accumulation of silt and mud along Gurney Drive, thus allowing mangrove trees to grow along the shoreline. Until recently, there were suggestions that this area, formerly earmarked for reclamation under the suspended Penang Outer Ring Road project, be reclaimed for a recreational park or allowed to be developed into a mangrove forest.

Gurney Drive is home to many prominent pre-war houses, colonial bungalows and the College General Complex, which was once used to train Catholic priests in Thailand, India, China, Japan and Myanmar.

In addition, two famous shopping malls - Gurney Plaza and Gurney Paragon - as well as numerous high-rise hotels and condominiums, are located along Gurney Drive. In 2016, land reclamation off Gurney Drive commenced as part of the construction of Gurney Bay, a public recreational park conceptualised as a "new iconic waterfront destination for Penang". The first phase of Gurney Bay was opened to public in 2024.

== Landmarks ==
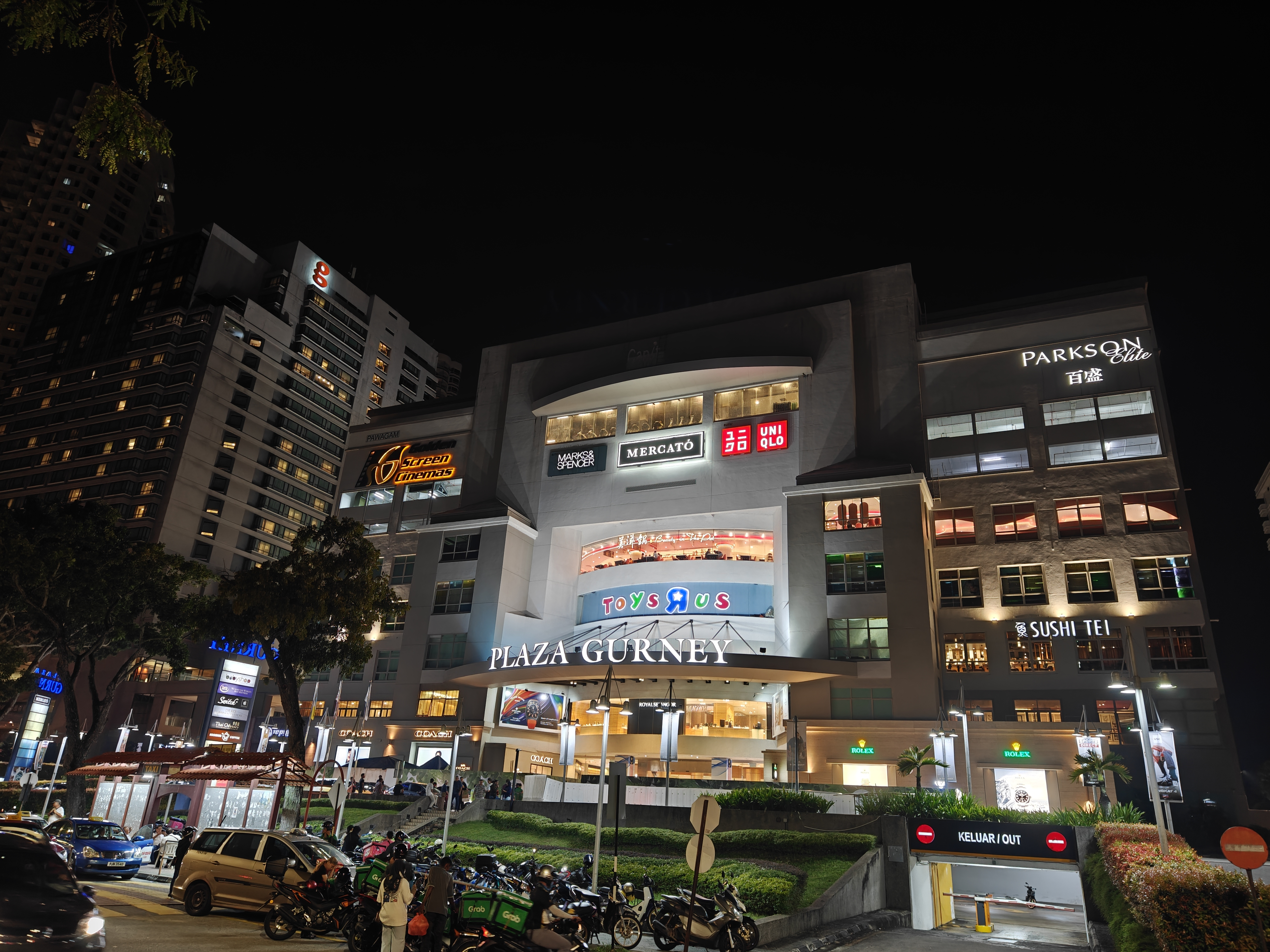
Gurney Plaza, one of the most popular shopping malls in George Town.

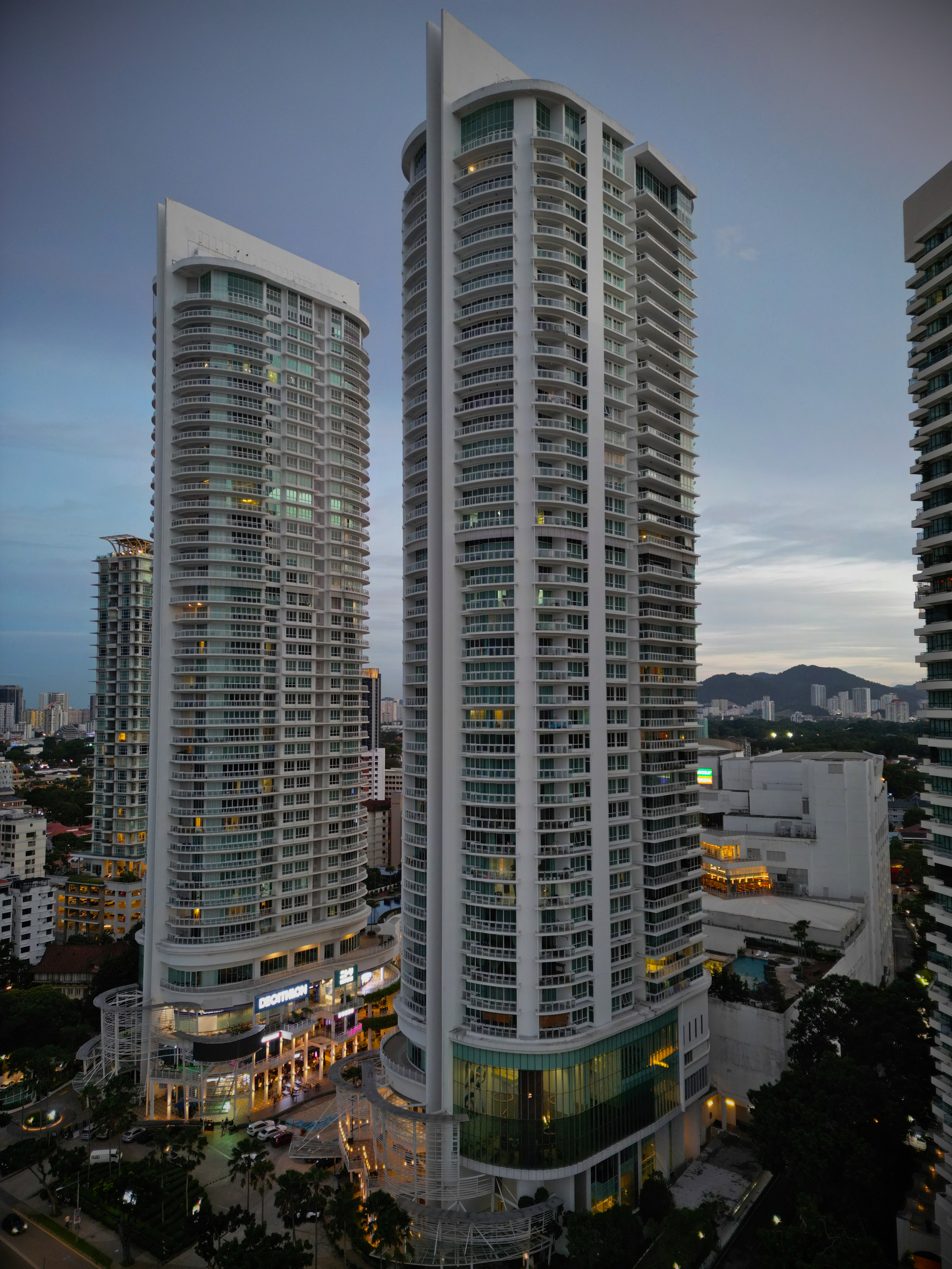
Gurney Paragon consists of a shopping mall and a pair of condominiums, which rank among the tallest skyscrapers in Penang.

Affluent beach-side bungalows were located here, many of which are today incorporated into the design of upscale condominiums. At the Pangkor Road end of Gurney Drive was the fabulous mansion of Kapitan China Chung Thye Phin, son of Kapitan China Chung Keng Quee, occupied today by One Persiaran Gurney condominiums.

While Gurney Drive has some of the most modern skyscrapers in Penang, it is also where opulent bungalows of the colonial era still stand. One of these is the Loke Mansion. Also at Gurney Drive is the St Joseph's Novitiate, which is now part of Gurney Paragon.

== Shopping centers ==
- Gurney Plaza
- Gurney Paragon
- Gurney Walk

== Food ==
Gurney Drive Hawker Centre is one of the largest and most well-known local eateries in Penang. It has been relocated a few times and is presently located at the northern end of Gurney Drive, just before the Gurney roundabout, between Sunrise Tower and Gurney Plaza. The Gurney Drive Hawker Centre has been around since the early 1970s, and is probably the best-known place for visitors to Penang to savour the local hawker fare.

Over the years, the price at the hawker centre has risen higher than at coffee shops elsewhere in Penang, due to popularity of the hawker centre among out-of-town visitors and general commercialisation. Food sold at the hawker centre include char kuey teow, Hokkien mee, jiu hoo eng chye (spinach with cuttlefish), koay teow th'ng, lok lok, mee goreng, Jawa mee, mee rebus, pasembur, rojak, satay, soya beancurd (douhua) and many more. The hawker centre has both a halal and non-halal section.

== Condominiums ==
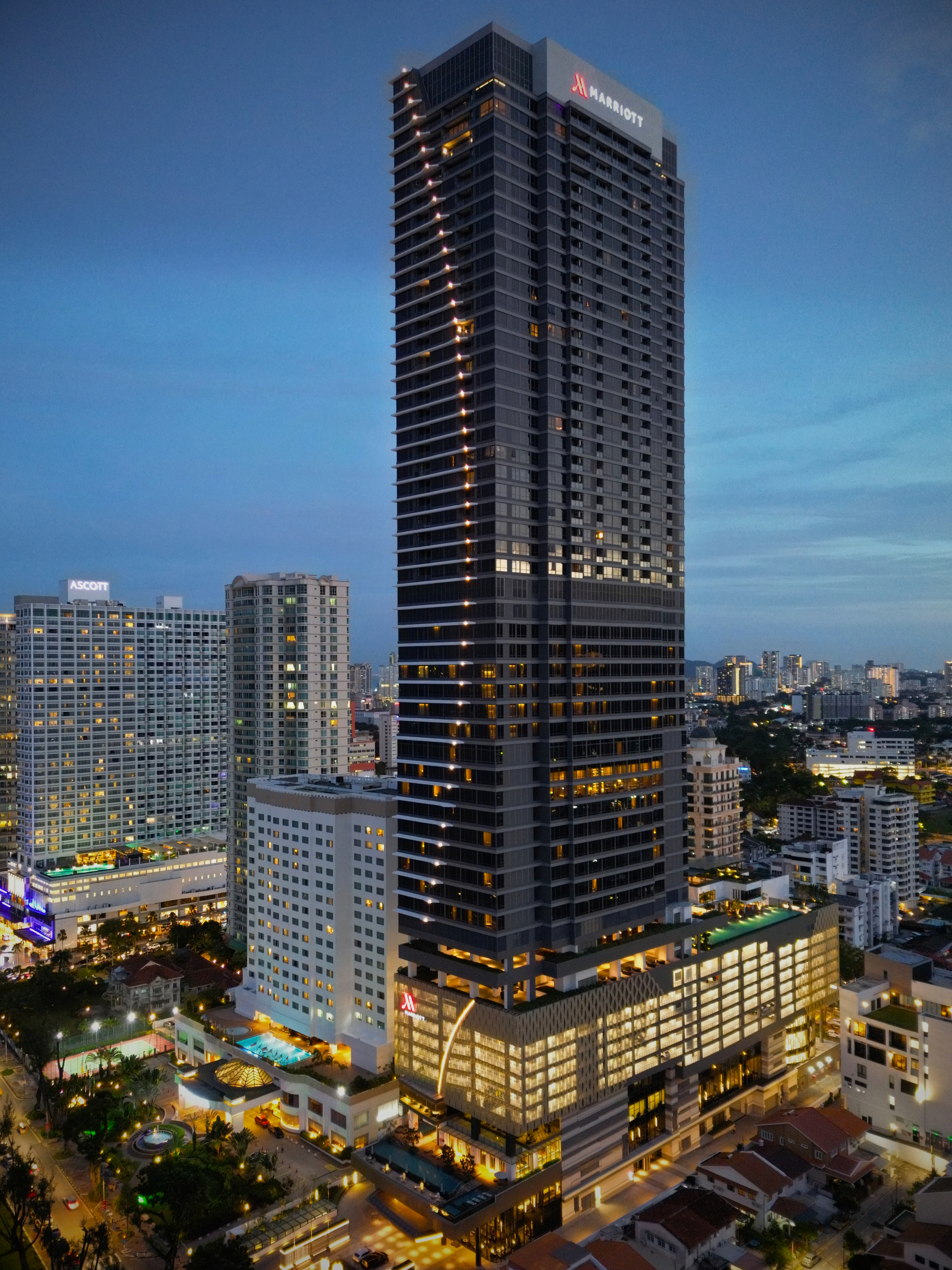
Marriott Residences Penang is the second tallest skyscraper in George Town and the tallest along Gurney Drive.

- Gurney Villa Condominium
- Gurney Park Condominium
- Gurney Beach Condominium
- Gurney Palace Condominium
- 1 Persiaran Gurney
- 8 Gurney
- 11 Gurney Drive
- Gurney Paragon
- Acadia
- Desa Mas
- Millennium Tower
- Silverton
- The Regency
- Sunrise SOHO
- Sunrise Tower
- Setia V Residences
- Marriott Residences Penang
- H Residences

== Hotels ==
- Evergreen Laurel Hotel
- G Hotel Gurney
- G Hotel Kelawai
- Ascott Gurney Penang
- Marriott Residences Penang

== See also ==
- George Town Central Business District
- List of tallest buildings in George Town
