= Gurney Paragon =

Mixed-use complex in George Town, Penang, Malaysia

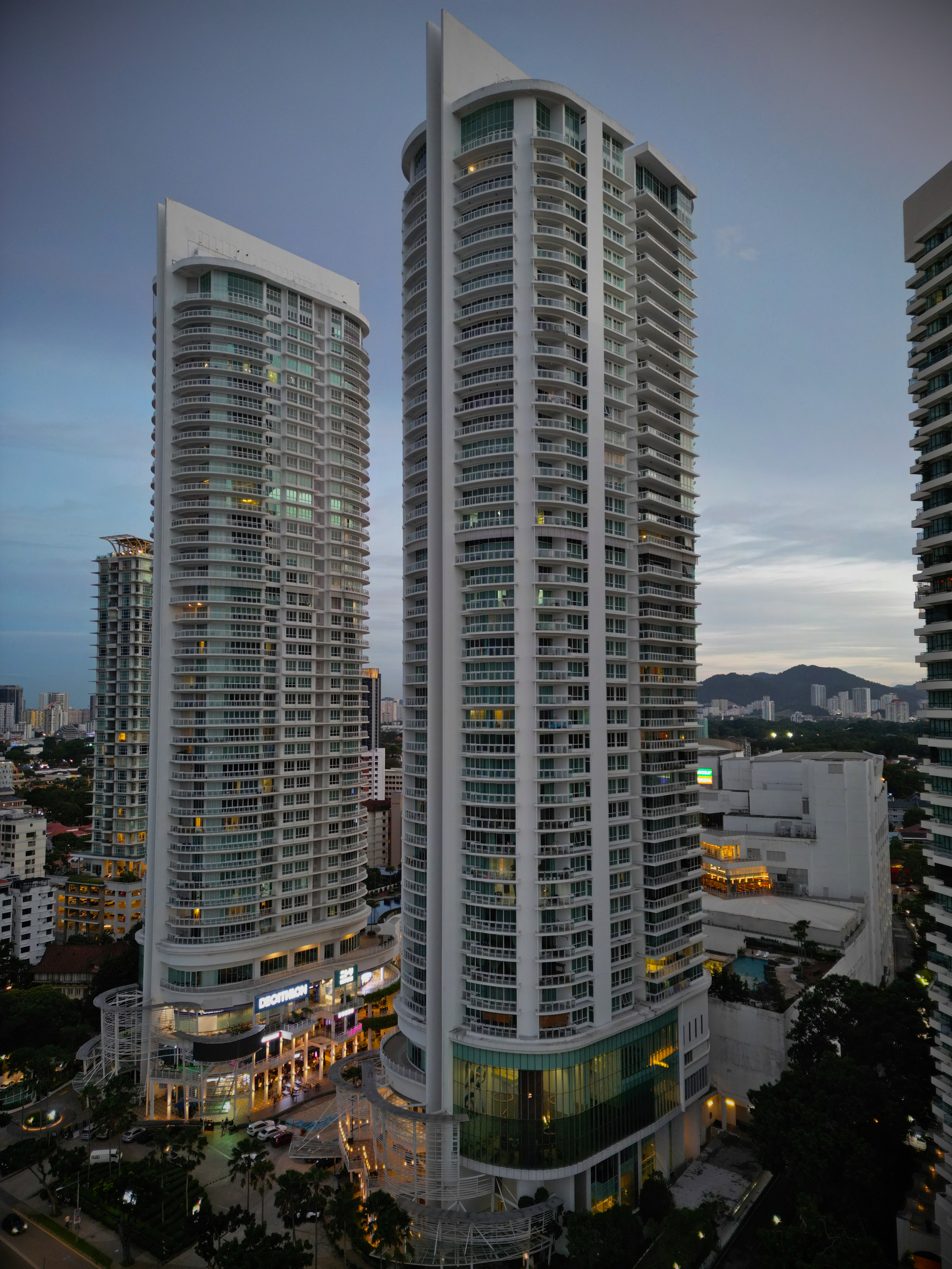

General information
- Type: Mixed-use complex
- Address: Gurney Drive, 10250 George Town, Penang, Malaysia
- Town or city: George Town, Penang
- Country: Malaysia
- Coordinates: 5.43639°N 100.31165°E
- Completed: 2013
- Cost: RM500 million
- Owner: Hunza Properties Berhad

Height
- Roof: 155 m (509 ft)
- Top floor: 43

Technical details
- Floor count: 43

Website
- www.hunzagroup.com/property/gurney-paragon-residences

Shopping mall details

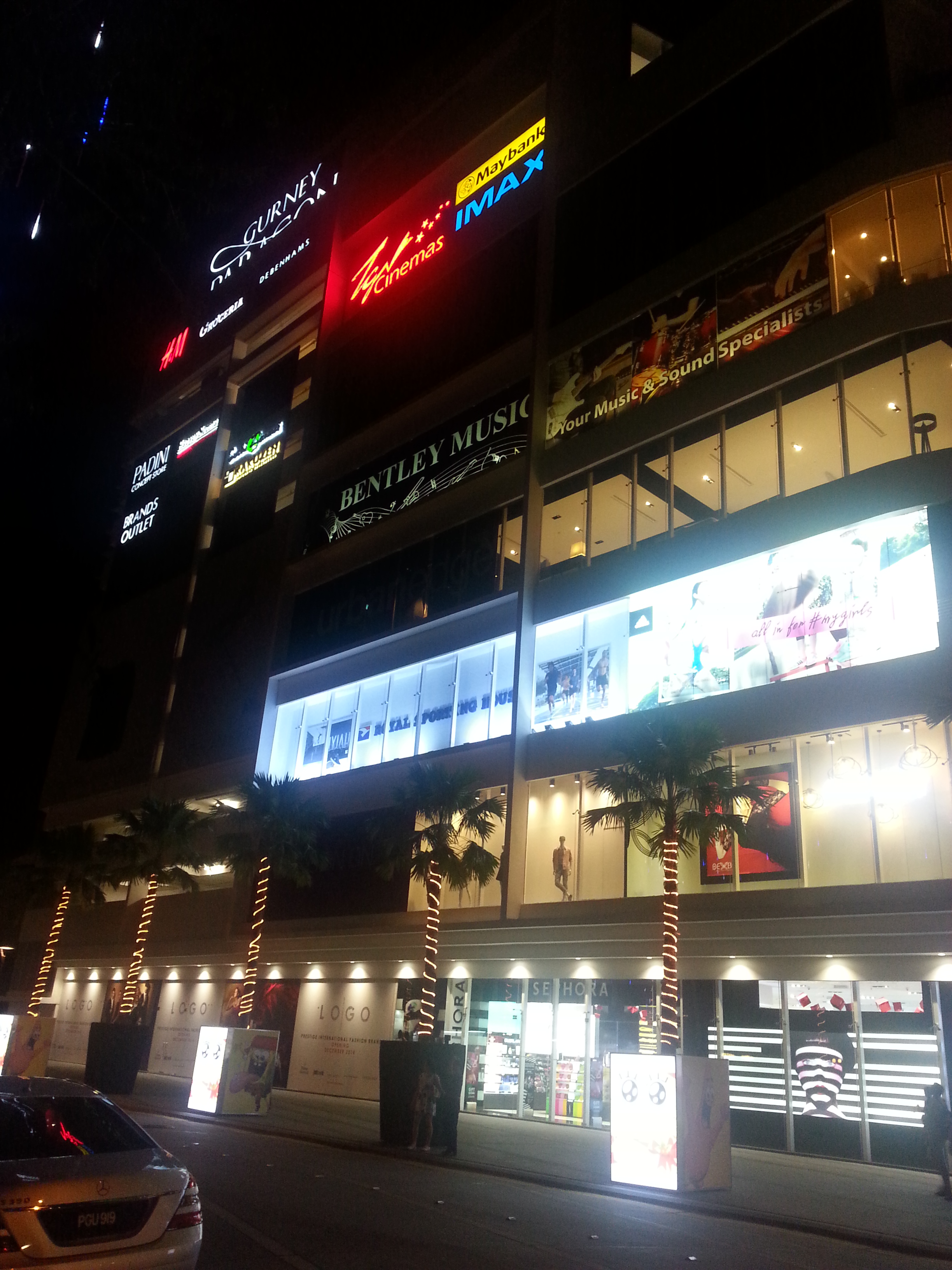
- Developer: Hunza Properties Berhad
- No. of stores and services: 200
- No. of anchor tenants: 1
- Total retail floor area: 700,000 sq ft (65,000 m^{2})
- No. of floors: 9
- Website: www.gurneyparagon.com

Gurney Paragon is a mixed-use complex within George Town in the Malaysian state of Penang. Situated at Gurney Drive within the city's Central Business District (CBD), it comprises twin residential towers, an office block and a nine-storey shopping mall forming the podium. Each residential tower stands at a height of 155 m (509 ft).

Launched in 2013, the shopping mall's main anchor tenant is TGV Cinemas, which operates a multiplex at its top floor. The mall also contains over 200 outlets spread out over nine floors, including a number of international brands.

== Retail outlets ==
Gurney Paragon houses over 40 fashion boutiques and 30 eateries, such as Starbucks, H&M, Cotton On, Polo Ralph Lauren and Victoria's Secret. Other international brands within the mall include Michael Kors, Rolex, APM Monaco, Daniel Wellington, Daiso, Ashley Furniture HomeStore and Nitori. Superstores such as MST Golf Arena and Decathlon are added more recently, while BookXcess occupies most of seventh floor with the country's longest and tallest bookshelf, measuring 70m long and 10m high, stocking more than a million book titles. In addition, Standard Chartered recently opened a new branch at the third floor of the East Tower, relocated from the former 86 Beach Street site.

== Entertainment ==
TGV Cinemas manages an IMAX-equipped multiplex within Gurney Paragon's ninth floor. The multiplex, which consists of eight standard halls and an IMAX theatre, is TGV Cinemas' first IMAX-equipped multiplex in northern Malaysia. There is also a karaoke outlet at the second floor of the East Tower.

== Location ==
Gurney Paragon is situated at Gurney Drive, a popular seafront promenade within the city of George Town. The drop-off point is at Jalan Kelawai entrance.

== Awards ==
In the 2018 Asia Pacific Property Awards, Gurney Paragon was named Malaysia's best retail development.

== See also ==
- List of shopping malls in Malaysia
- List of tallest buildings in George Town, Penang
