= Marriott Residences Penang =

Condominium in George Town, Penang, Malaysia

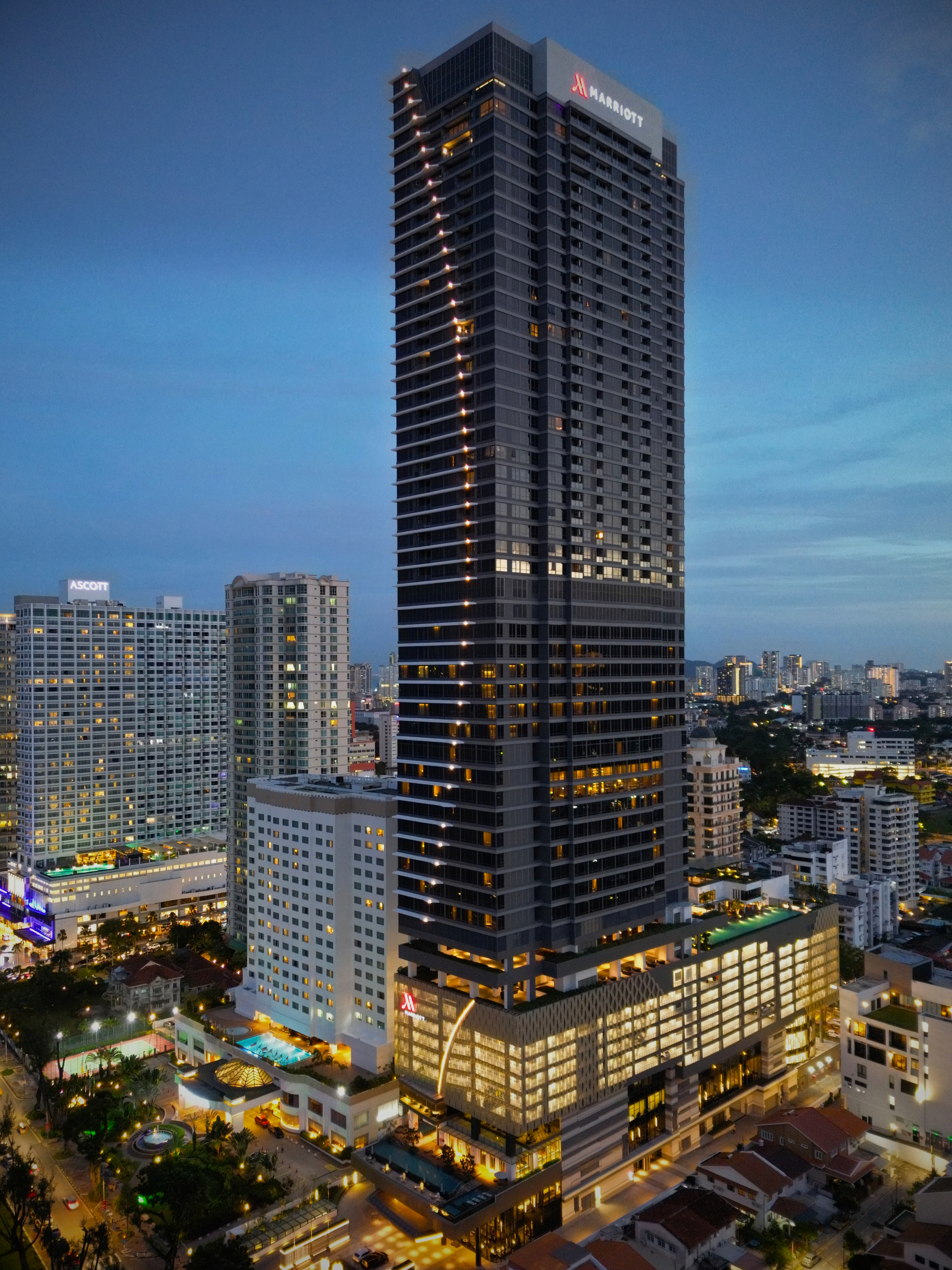

General information
- Type: Condominium
- Location: Gurney Drive, 10250 George Town, Penang, Malaysia, George Town, Penang, Malaysia
- Coordinates: 5.431511°N 100.317491°E
- Completed: 2023
- Opened: 2024
- Owner: BSG Property

Height
- Roof: 223 m (732 ft)

Technical details
- Floor count: 55

Design and construction
- Architect: SAA Architects
- Developer: Taman Sri Bunga Sdn. Bhd.

Marriott Residences Penang is a seafronting residential skyscraper within George Town in the Malaysian state of Penang. Located at Gurney Drive within the city's Central Business District (CBD), the tower stands at a height of 223 m (732 ft), making it the second tallest skyscraper in the city of George Town as of 2023.

Built by local developer BSG Property, the 55-storey building was topped out in 2023 and opened in the following year. It is also the first of Marriott Residences in Southeast Asia, marking the entry of the Marriott brand into Penang's branded residences segment. The skyscraper contains a total of 223 guest rooms, 90 executive hotel rooms and 302 branded residential units.

== See also ==
- List of tallest buildings in George Town
- Gurney Drive
