= List of tallest buildings in George Town, Penang =

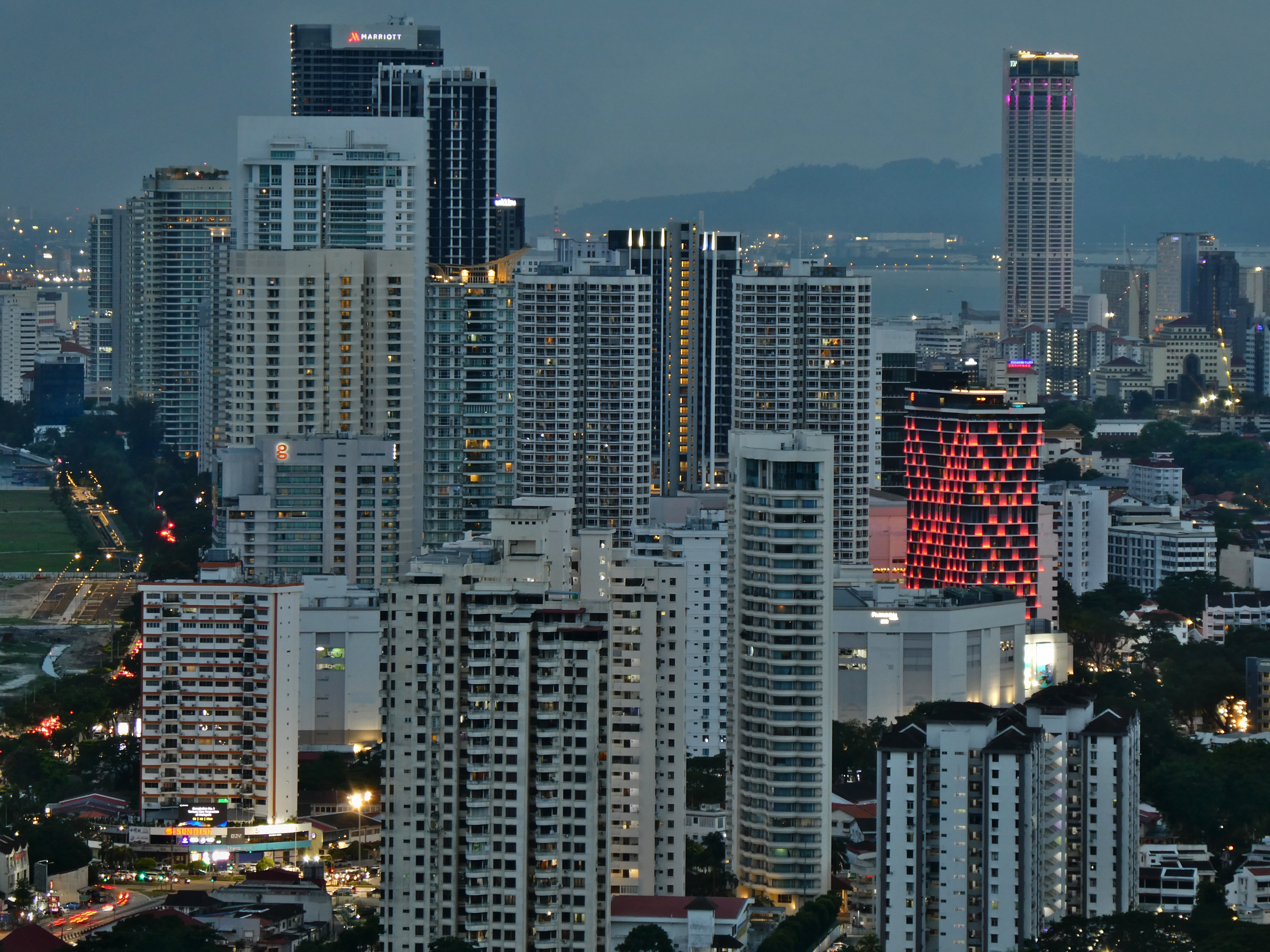
Skyline of George Town c. 2025

George Town, which encompasses the entirety of Penang Island and the surrounding islets, is the capital city of Penang and the core of the George Town Conurbation, Malaysia's second largest metropolitan area. Due to the shortage of land that is inherent in island cities, high-rise buildings have been springing up all over George Town. According to the Council on Tall Buildings and Urban Habitat (CTBUH), George Town has at least 38 skyscrapers exceeding 150 m (492 ft) in height as of 2024, the second most in Malaysia after Kuala Lumpur.

Penang's first skyscraper remains the tallest within the state to this day. Completed in 1986, the Komtar Tower was originally 232 metres (761 ft) tall. It now houses the offices of the Penang state government, including that of the Chief Minister of Penang. Extensions on the roof of the skyscraper during refurbishments between 2016 and 2018 increased its height to 249 m (817 ft).

This is a list of the tallest buildings within George Town which are ranked according to the height and number of floors of each structure.

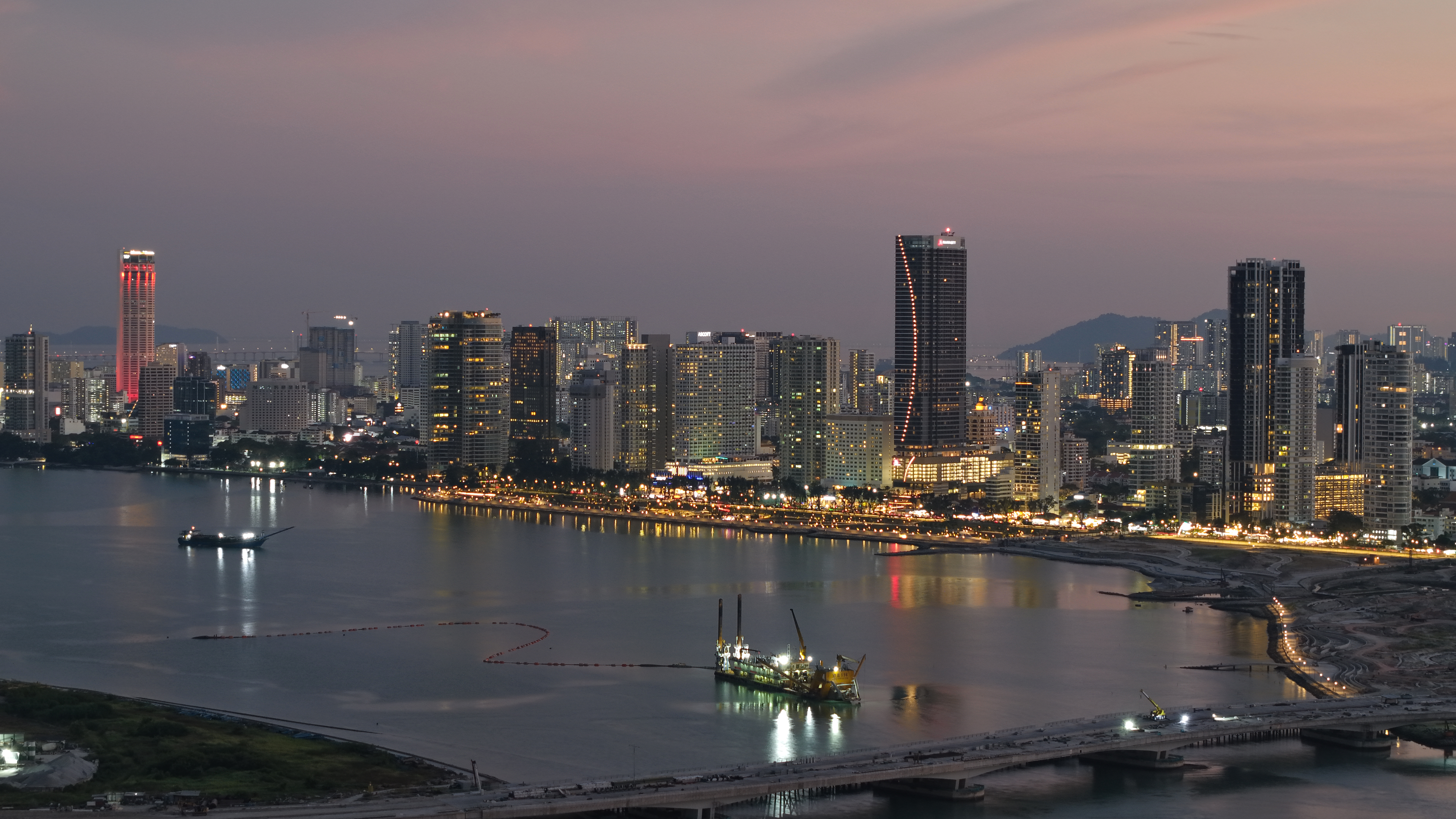
Skyline of George Town at dusk c. 2025

== Completed buildings ==
Locations of:
skyscrapers between 150 m (490 ft) and 199.9 m (656 ft) in height
skyscrapers taller than 200 m (660 ft) in height

This list ranks completed and topped-out buildings in George Town that stand at least 150 m (492 ft) tall, based on standard height measurement which includes spires and architectural details, but excludes antenna masts. An equal sign (=) following a rank indicates the same height between two or more buildings. An approximation sign (≈) indicates an estimated height measurement from the Council on Tall Buildings and Urban Habitat (CTBUH). The "Year" column indicates the year in which a building was or will be completed.

Was Malaysia's tallest skyscraper upon completion

| Rank | Name of skyscraper | Height | | Floors | Year | Location | Coordinates | Image | Ref. |
| Rank | Name of skyscraper | m | ft | Floors | Year | Location | Coordinates | Image | Ref. |
|---|---|---|---|---|---|---|---|---|---|
| 1 | Komtar | 248.7 m | 816 ft | 68 | 1986 | Penang Road | 5.4146°N 100.3297°E | | |
| 2 | Marriott Residences Penang | 223.5 m | 732 ft | 56 | 2023 | Gurney Drive | 5.4317°N 100.3178°E | | |
| 3 | Muze Block B | 205.5 m | 674 ft | 58 | 2022 | Bayan Baru | 5.3304°N 100.2851°E | | |
| 4 | Arte S Tower B | 186.0 m | 610 ft | 51 | 2018 | Bukit Gambir | 5.3593°N 100.2925°E | | |
| 5 | The Landmark | ≈179.0 m | ≈587 ft | 41 | 2017 | Tanjong Tokong | 5.4483°N 100.3058°E | | |
| 6 | Gurney Beach Resort Condominium | ≈172.0 m | ≈564 ft | 39 | 1999 | Gurney Drive | 5.4305°N 100.3184°E | | |
| 7 | I-Santorini Tower C | 167.0 m | 548 ft | 49 | 2019 | Tanjong Tokong | 5.4557°N 100.3087°E | | |
| 8 | Setia V Residences Tower A | ≈164.0 m | ≈538 ft | 48 | 2017 | Gurney Drive | 5.4331°N 100.3150°E | | |
| 9= | I-Santorini Tower A | ≈164.0 m | ≈538 ft | 48 | 2019 | Tanjong Tokong | 5.4545°N 100.3082°E | | |
| 9= | I-Santorini Tower B | ≈164.0 m | ≈538 ft | 48 | 2019 | Tanjong Tokong | 5.4552°N 100.3084°E | | |
| 11= | The Latitude A | ≈161.0 m | ≈528 ft | 43 | 2015 | Mount Erskine | 5.4499°N 100.2984°E | | |
| 11= | The Latitude B | ≈161.0 m | ≈528 ft | 43 | 2015 | Mount Erskine | 5.4499°N 100.2985°E | | |
| 13= | 3 Residence Tower A | ≈160.0 m | ≈525 ft | 47 | 2021 | Lebuh Sungai Pinang 1 | 5.3986°N 100.3281°E | | |
| 13= | 3 Residence Tower B | ≈160.0 m | ≈525 ft | 47 | 2021 | Lebuh Sungai Pinang 1 | 5.3985°N 100.3275°E | | |
| 15 | The Rise Collection, South Tower | ≈157.0 m | ≈515 ft | 46 | 2019 | Jalan Dr. Wu Lien Teh | 5.4097°N 100.3257°E | | |
| 16= | Gurney Paragon East Tower | 155.0 m | 509 ft | 43 | 2011 | Gurney Drive | 5.4362°N 100.3121°E | | |
| 16= | Gurney Paragon West Tower | 155.0 m | 509 ft | 43 | 2011 | Gurney Drive | 5.4368°N 100.3115°E | | |
| 18= | Imperial Grande A | ≈153.0 m | ≈502 ft | 45 | 2020 | Relau | 5.3369°N 100.2720°E | | |
| 18= | Imperial Grande B | ≈153.0 m | ≈502 ft | 45 | 2020 | Relau | 5.3365°N 100.2730°E | | |
| 18= | Jazz Residence | ≈153.0 m | ≈502 ft | 45 | 2017 | Tanjong Pinang | 5.4582°N 100.3102°E | | |
| 18= | One Tanjong 1 | ≈153.0 m | ≈502 ft | 41 | 2013 | Tanjong Bungah | 5.4657°N 100.2933°E | | |
| 18= | One Tanjong 2 | ≈153.0 m | ≈502 ft | 41 | 2013 | Tanjong Bungah | 5.4667°N 100.2939°E | | |
| 18= | Tri Pinnacle A | ≈153.0 m | ≈502 ft | 45 | 2018 | Mount Erskine | 5.4494°N 100.2960°E | | |
| 18= | Tri Pinnacle B | ≈153.0 m | ≈502 ft | 45 | 2018 | Mount Erskine | 5.4492°N 100.2955°E | | |
| 18= | Tri Pinnacle C | ≈153.0 m | ≈502 ft | 45 | 2018 | Mount Erskine | 5.4490°N 100.2951°E | | |
| 26= | One Foresta Block 1 | ≈151.0 m | ≈495 ft | 42 | 2019 | Bayan Lepas | 5.2994°N 100.2569°E | | |
| 26= | One Foresta Block 2 | ≈151.0 m | ≈495 ft | 42 | 2019 | Bayan Lepas | 5.2995°N 100.2576°E | | |
| 26= | One Foresta Block 3 | ≈151.0 m | ≈495 ft | 42 | 2019 | Bayan Lepas | 5.3001°N 100.2586°E | | |
| 26= | One Foresta Block 4 | ≈151.0 m | ≈495 ft | 42 | 2019 | Bayan Lepas | 5.3012°N 100.2587°E | | |
| 26= | Urban Suite II | ≈151.0 m | ≈495 ft | 42 | 2020 | Jelutong | 5.3992°N 100.3160°E | | |
| 26= | Urban Suite III | ≈151.0 m | ≈495 ft | 42 | 2020 | Jelutong | 5.3992°N 100.3160°E | | |
| 26= | Iconic Regency | ≈151.0 m | ≈495 ft | 42 | 2024 | Sungai Nibong | 5.3322°N 100.2987°E | | |
| 30= | City of Dreams Tower 1 | ≈150.0 m | ≈492 ft | 40 | 2021 | Tanjong Pinang | 5.4461°N 100.3106°E | | |
| 30= | City of Dreams Tower 2 | ≈150.0 m | ≈492 ft | 40 | 2021 | Tanjong Pinang | 5.4452°N 100.3094°E | | |
| 30= | Grace Residence | ≈150.0 m | ≈492 ft | 44 | 2016 | Jelutong | 5.3898°N 100.3171°E | | |
| 30= | Novus Residences | ≈150.0 m | ≈492 ft | 44 | 2020 | Sungai Nibong | 5.3322°N 100.2987°E | | |
| 30= | Skyridge Garden Tower A | ≈150.0 m | ≈492 ft | 40 | 2019 | Mount Erskine | 5.4497°N 100.2983°E | | |
| 30= | Skyridge Garden Tower B | ≈150.0 m | ≈492 ft | 40 | 2019 | Mount Erskine | 5.4498°N 100.2986°E | | |
| 30= | Skyview Residence | ≈150.0 m | ≈492 ft | 43 | 2018 | Jelutong | 5.3992°N 100.3160°E | | |

== Buildings under construction and proposed ==
This list is composed of buildings over 100 m (328 ft) within George Town that are either under construction or at proposal stage.

| Name | Height (m) | Floors | Location | Status |
|---|---|---|---|---|
| The Westin Residences Penang | 300 | 69 | Gurney Drive | Under construction, will be the tallest in Penang upon completion |
| Andaman Island Iconic Tower | 220 | 60 | Andaman Island | Proposed |
| PICC Iconic Tower | 210 | 63 | Bayan Baru | Proposed |
| Runnymede Bay | 211 | 61 | Northam Road | Proposed |
| The LightHauz | | 57 | The Light Waterfront | Proposed |
| Urban Suite I | 232 | 52 | Jelutong | Proposed |
| Avea @ Andaman Island | | 52 | Andaman Island | Proposed |
| Senze @ PICC Tower A | | 51 | Bayan Baru | Under construction |
| Senze @ PICC Tower C | | 51 | Bayan Baru | Under construction |
| Senze @ PICC Tower B | | 50 | Bayan Baru | Under construction |
| The Lume @ Andaman Island | | 49 | Andaman Island | Under construction |
| Maris @ Andaman Island | | 49 | Andaman Island | Under construction |
| Maritime Signature | | 45 | Sungai Pinang | Under construction |
| Pinnacle Bukit Gambier | | 45 | Gelugor | Proposed |
| Lumina Residence | | 44 | Pulau Tikus | Under construction |
| Scott @ Logan | | 36 | Logan Road | Under construction |

== Timeline of tallest buildings ==
Since the start of the 20th century, the following buildings have claimed the status of the tallest building in George Town at one point.

| Name of skyscraper | Height | | Floors | Location | Coordinates | Years as tallest | Image | Notes | Ref. |
| Name of skyscraper | m | ft | Floors | Location | Coordinates | Years as tallest | Image | Notes | Ref. |
|---|---|---|---|---|---|---|---|---|---|
| HSBC Building | 37 m | 120 ft | 3 | Downing Street | 5.4183°N 100.3433°E | 1906–1909 | | Destroyed during World War II | |
| Wisma Kastam | Unknown | | 3 | China Street Ghaut | 5.4154°N 100.3425°E | 1909–1951 | | The only train station in Malaya without a railway | |
| HSBC Building | Unknown | | 6 | Downing Street | 5.4183°N 100.3433°E | 1951–1962 | | Replaces the original HSBC Building | |
| Tuanku Syed Putra Building | 38 m | 126 ft | 10 | Downing Street | 5.4177°N 100.3439°E | 1962–1966 | | Former seat of the Penang state government | |
| Hotel Ambassador | Unknown | | 12 | Penang Road | 5.4211°N 100.3335°E | 1966–1969 | | | |
| Rifle Range Flats | Unknown | | 17–18 | Ayer Itam | 5.4106°N 100.2906°E | 1969–1977 | | The first residential high-rises in Penang | |
| Sunrise Tower | Unknown | | 18 | Gurney Drive | 5.4398°N 100.3082°E | 1977–1982 | | | |
| Komtar | 231.7 m (1982–2015); 248.7 m (2015–present) | 760 ft (1982–2015); 816 ft (2015–present) | 65 (1982–2015); 68 (2015–present) | Penang Road | 5.4146°N 100.3297°E | 1982–present | | The first 29 storeys were completed by 1982 | |

== See also ==
- List of tallest buildings in the world
- List of tallest buildings in Malaysia
- List of tallest buildings in Kuala Lumpur
- List of tallest buildings in Johor Bahru
- List of tallest buildings in Kota Kinabalu
