= Mount Erskine =

- Neighbourhood of George Town
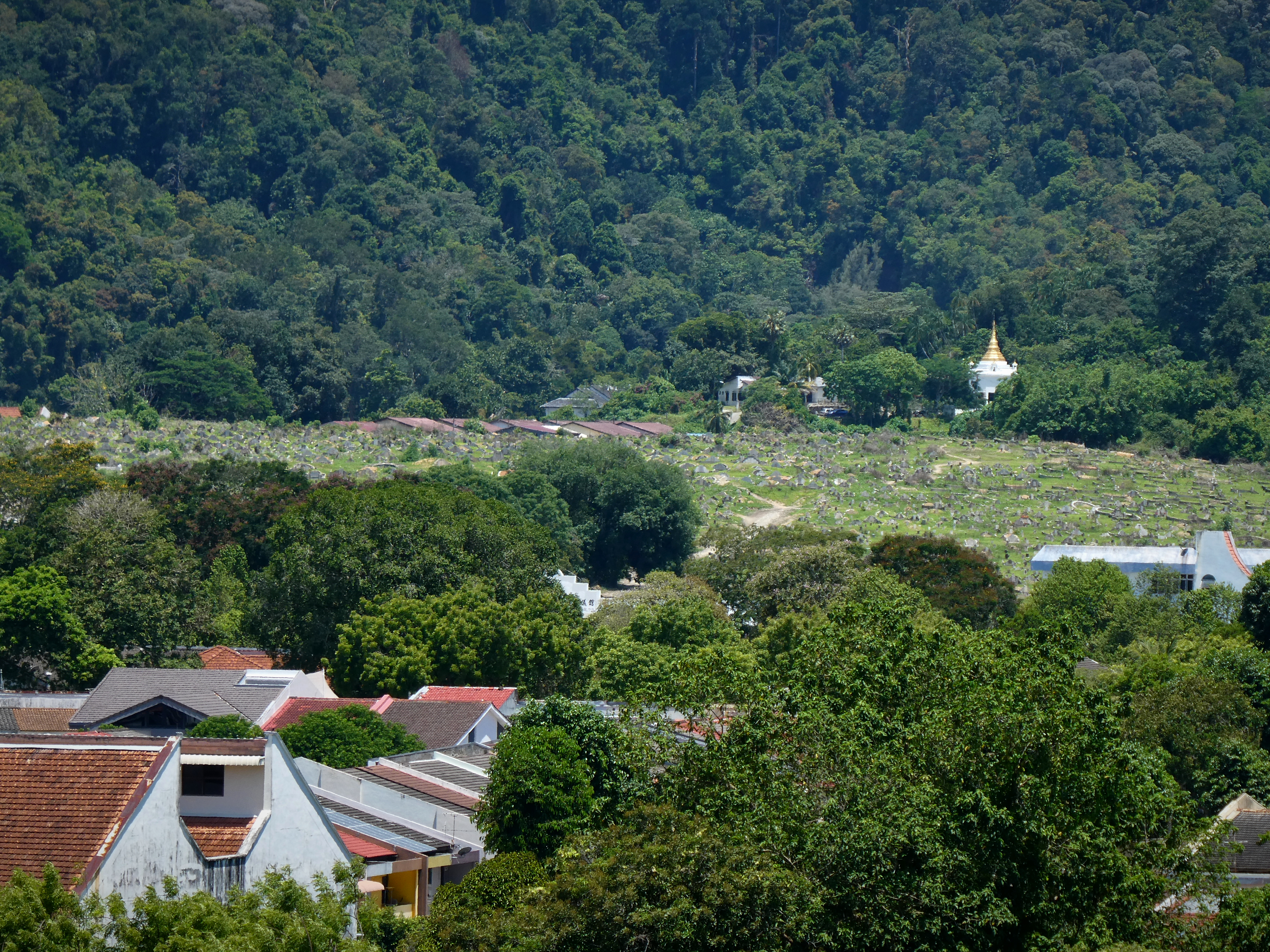

- Location within George Town in Penang
- Coordinates: 5°26′54.744″N 100°18′3.5568″E
- Country: Malaysia
- State: Penang
- City: George Town
- District: Northeast
- Time zone: UTC+8 (MST)
  - Summer (DST): Not observed
- Postal code: 10470

Mount Erskine is a residential neighbourhood within the city of George Town in the Malaysian state of Penang. This hilly neighbourhood is located 4 km (2.5 mi) northwest of the city centre, between Tanjung Tokong and Pulau Tikus.

Notable for its large Chinese cemeteries established by the Cantonese, Teochew and Hokkien communities on Penang Island, the neighbourhood witnesses a considerable increase in activity during the annual Qingming Festival.

== Etymology ==
Mount Erskine was named after John James Erskine, a member of George Town's committee of assessors around 1810; this committee would become the predecessor to the present-day Penang Island City Council.

== History ==
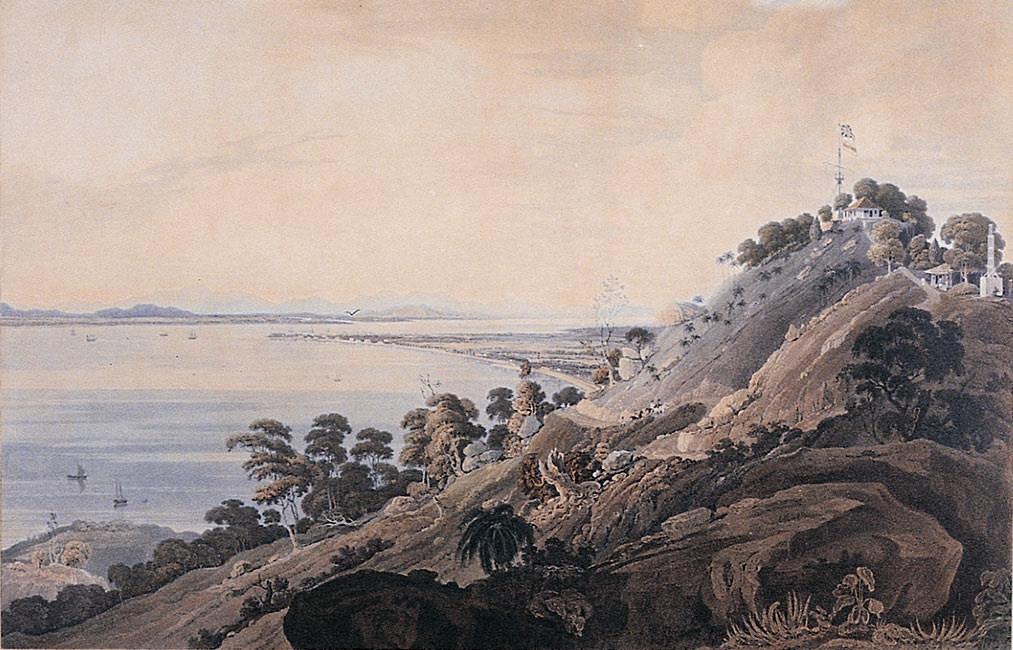
Mount Erskine and Pulau Tikus in 1818

The Chinese cemeteries in the area date back to the early 19th century. The southern cemetery, nearest to Gottlieb Road, is managed by the United Hokkien Cemeteries and serves as the final resting place for Penang's Hokkien community. Meanwhile, the northern cemetery is owned by the Kwangtung and Tengchow Association, a joint organisation that represents the Cantonese and the Teochews. The first tomb within this cemetery dates back to 1795.

The two large cemeteries in Mount Erskine did not deter urbanisation from creeping into the area. In the 1970s, residential estates surrounding the cemeteries were created, particularly around Pepper Estate to the north and Hong Seng Estate to the west. Apartments, such as Taman Evergreen, were also constructed later.

Among the more recent issues affecting this neighbourhood are the continuing development of the hilltop, which has been flattened for the construction of more residential properties, and the risk of landslides at Hong Seng Estate.

=== Pearl Hill ===
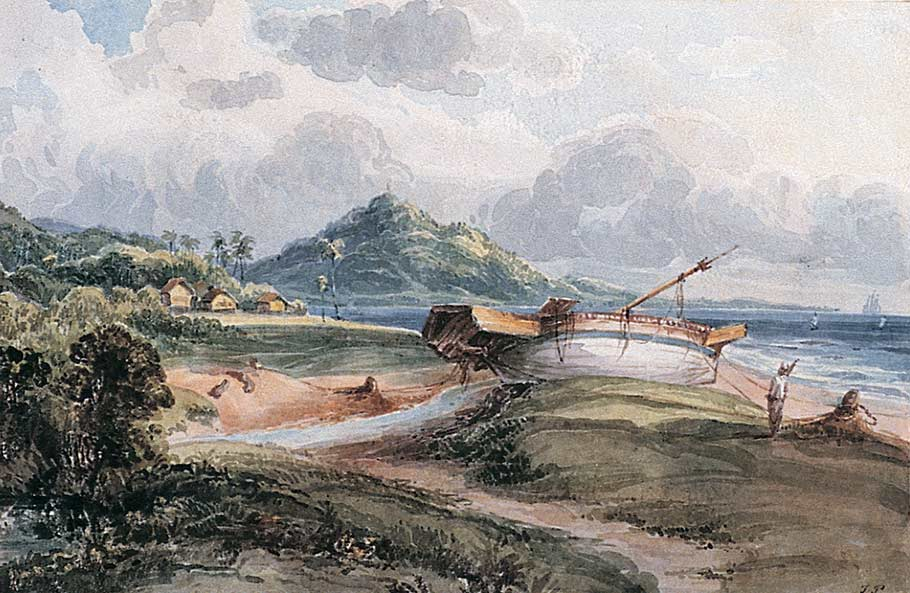
Mount Erskine in 1824

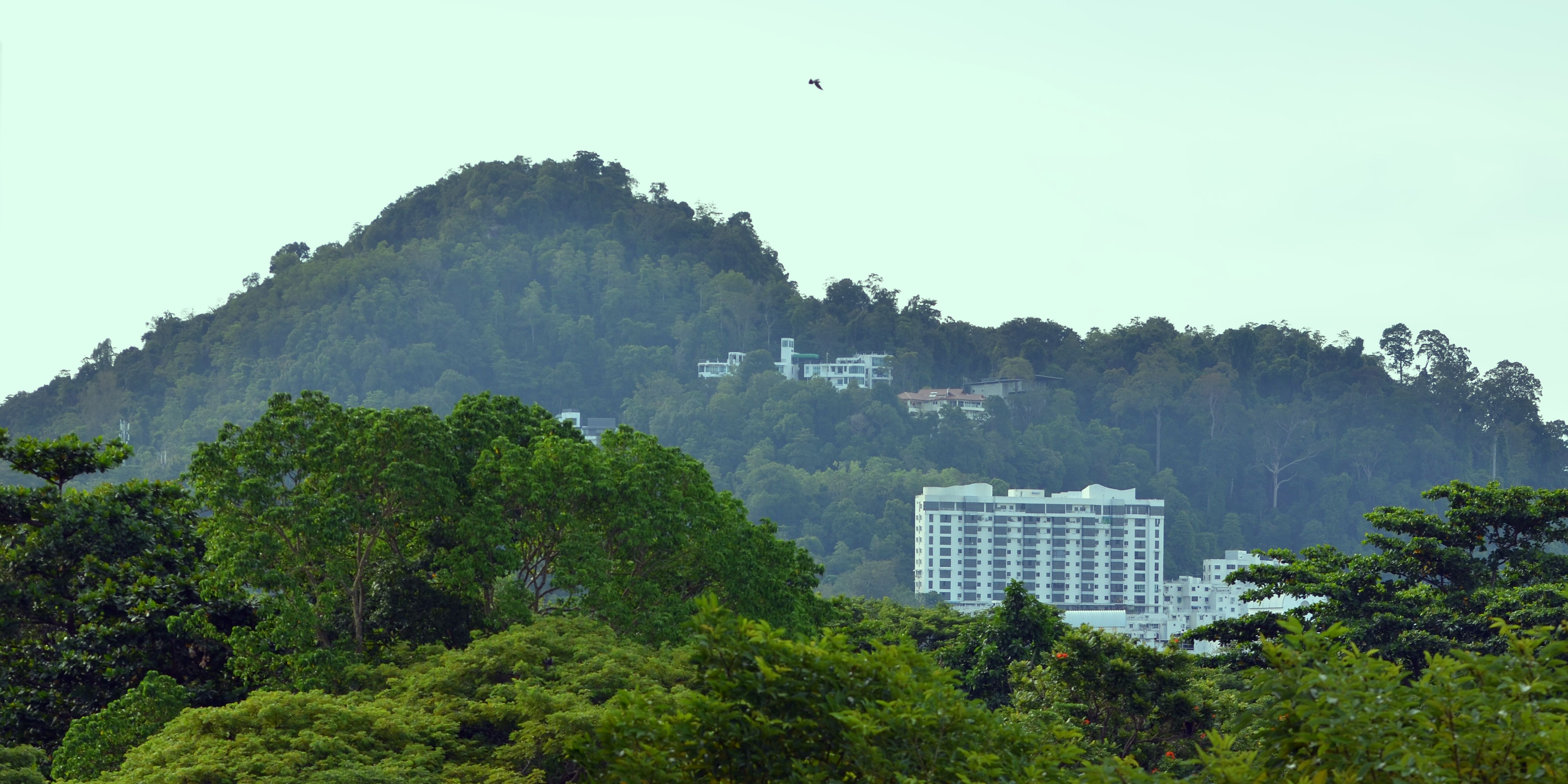
Pearl Hill in 2022

The Mount Erskine neighbourhood is named after Mount Erskine Road which led to the 218 m (715 ft) hill now known as Pearl Hill (Bukit Mutiara in Malay) but was the original Mount Erskine.

It was also called Mount Olivia, after the wife of Stamford Raffles.

Pearl Hill Sdn Bhd began developing the hill in 1974. Since then, the developer’s name caught on instead of the project name, Mount Evergreen. Pearl Hill is now an upscale neighbourhood with bungalows, Pearl Hill Villa, Pearl Hill Condominium and a Chinese temple.

== Transportation ==
Mount Erskine Road is the main thoroughfare within the neighbourhood, cutting through both cemeteries towards Vale of Tempe Road to the north.

Residents within this neighbourhood are served by three Rapid Penang bus routes, namely 104, the Pulau Tikus Loop (PTL) and the Congestion Alleviation Transport (CAT) Tanjung Tokong route. The former links Mount Erskine with George Town proper, as well as the neighbouring Tanjung Bungah and Pulau Tikus suburbs. The PTL and the CAT are free-of-charge transit routes within Pulau Tikus and Tanjung Tokong respectively.
