= Penang Road, George Town =

Road in the Malaysian state of Penang

Penang Road
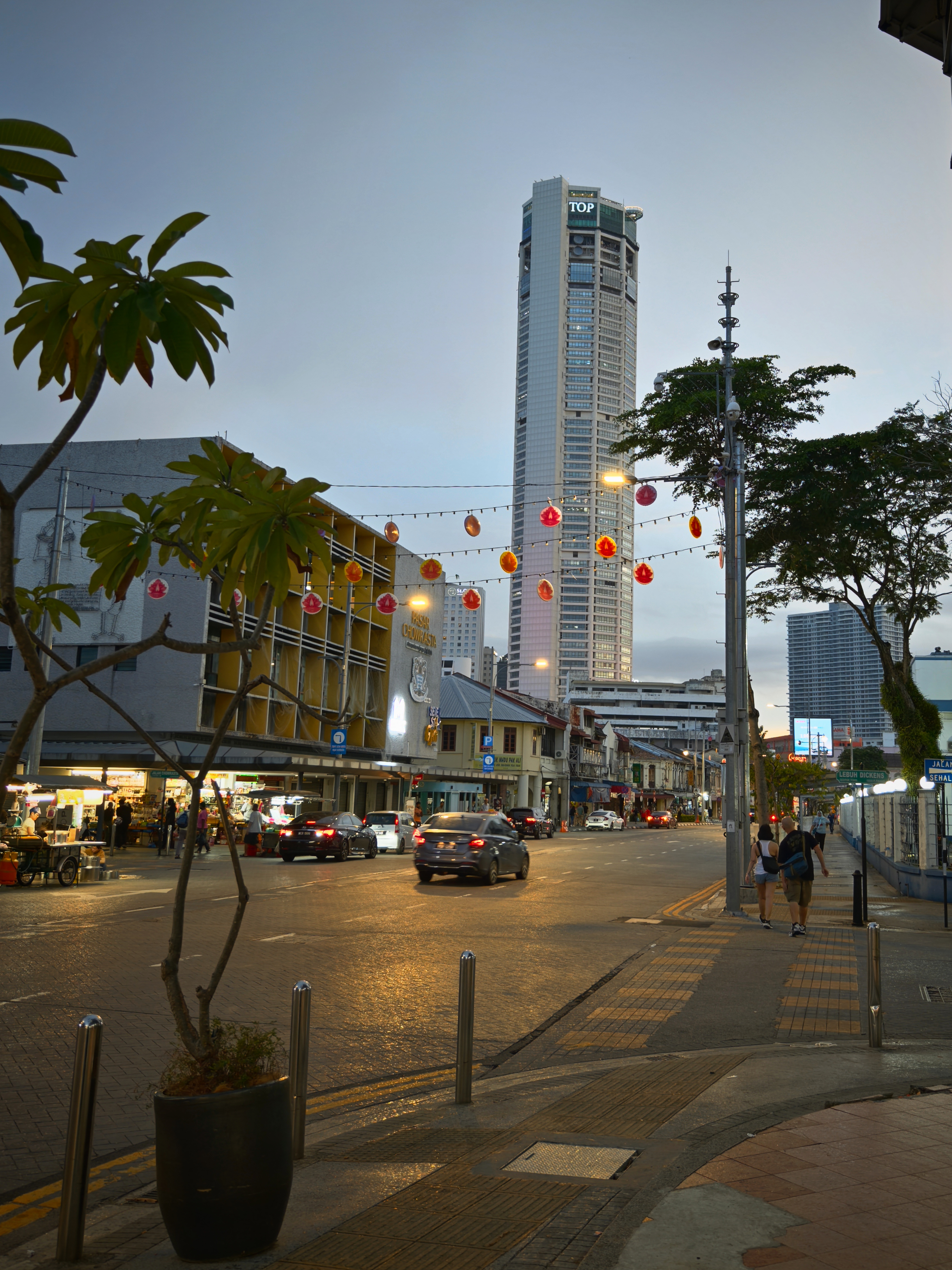
- Native name: Malay: Jalan Penang; Simplified Chinese: 槟榔律; traditional Chinese: 檳榔律; Tamil: ராஜாதி மேடு
- Maintained by: Penang Island City Council
- Location: George Town
- Coordinates: 5.418119°N 100.33143°E
- North end: Farquhar Street
- South end: Magazine Circus (next to Komtar)
- JALAN PENANG Penang Rd10000 P. PINANG

UNESCO World Heritage Site
- Type: Cultural
- Criteria: ii, iii, iv
- Designated: 2008 (32nd session)
- Part of: George Town UNESCO Buffer Zone
- Reference no.: 1223
- Region: Asia-Pacific

Penang Road is a major thoroughfare in the city of George Town, within the Malaysian state of Penang. It runs between Farquhar Street to the north and Komtar to the south. It is a one-way road, with traffic directed southwards towards Komtar.

As a major artery within the city centre, Penang Road frequently experiences heavy traffic, as it is home to a number of attractions such as the bars at Upper Penang Road and Chowrasta Market, one of the few wet markets still in operation within the UNESCO World Heritage Site. In particular, Chowrasta Market offers a variety of local produce and pastries unique to Penang, such as nutmeg and tau sar pneah biscuits.

A number of hotels also line the Upper Penang Road stretch between Farquhar and Leith streets, such as the Merchant Hotel.

== History ==
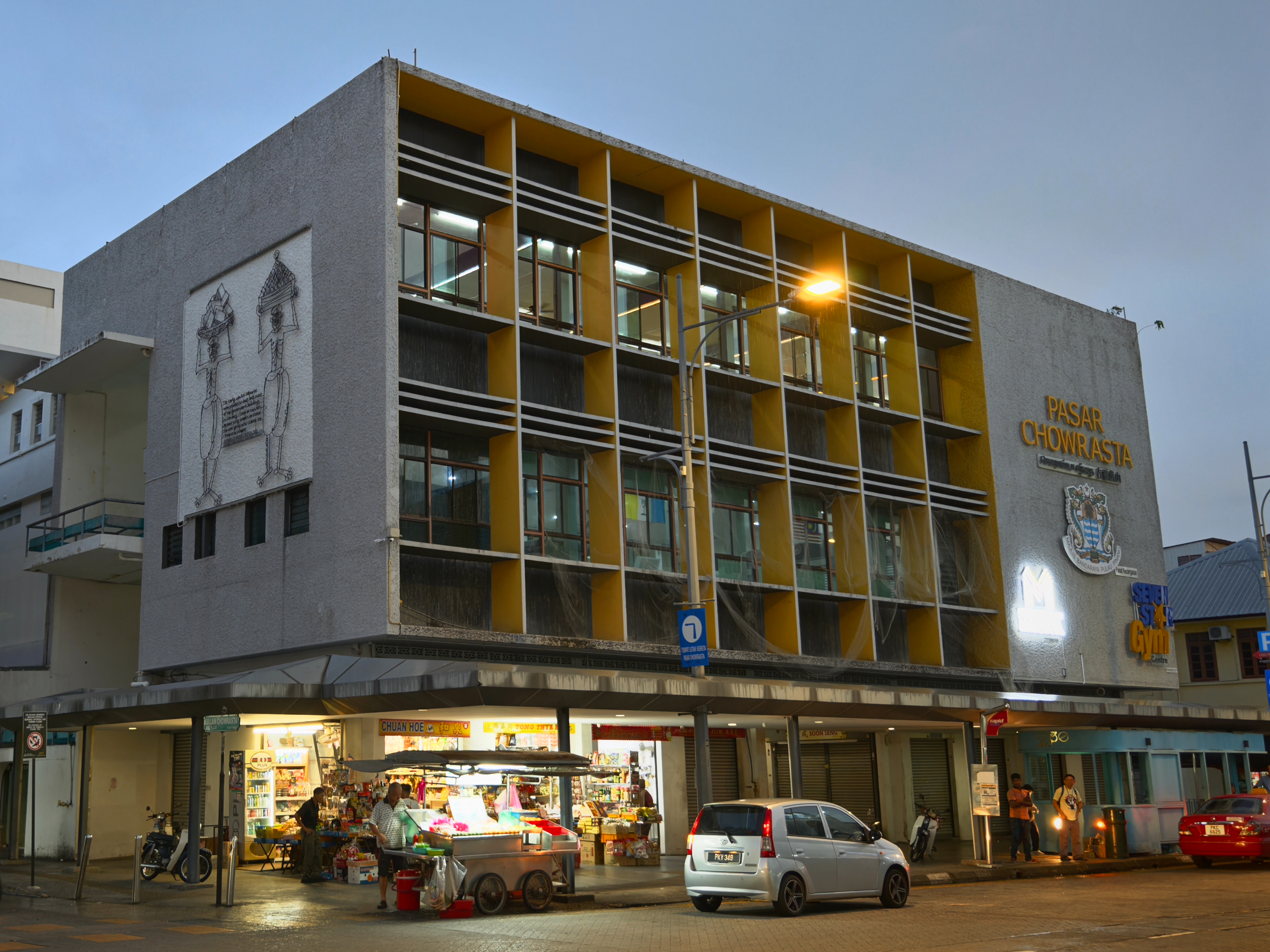
Chowrasta Market

Penang Road was one of the first roads to be built outside the original town area planned by Francis Light. For centuries, it has served as a retail street, especially along the stretch running in front of Chowrasta Market. The market was built in the 1890s.

The Penang police headquarters at Penang Road was the scene of a number of executions by the Imperial Japanese Army during the Japanese Occupation period in World War II.

== See also ==
- Street names of George Town, Penang
