= Gurney Plaza =

Shopping mall in George Town, Penang, Malaysia

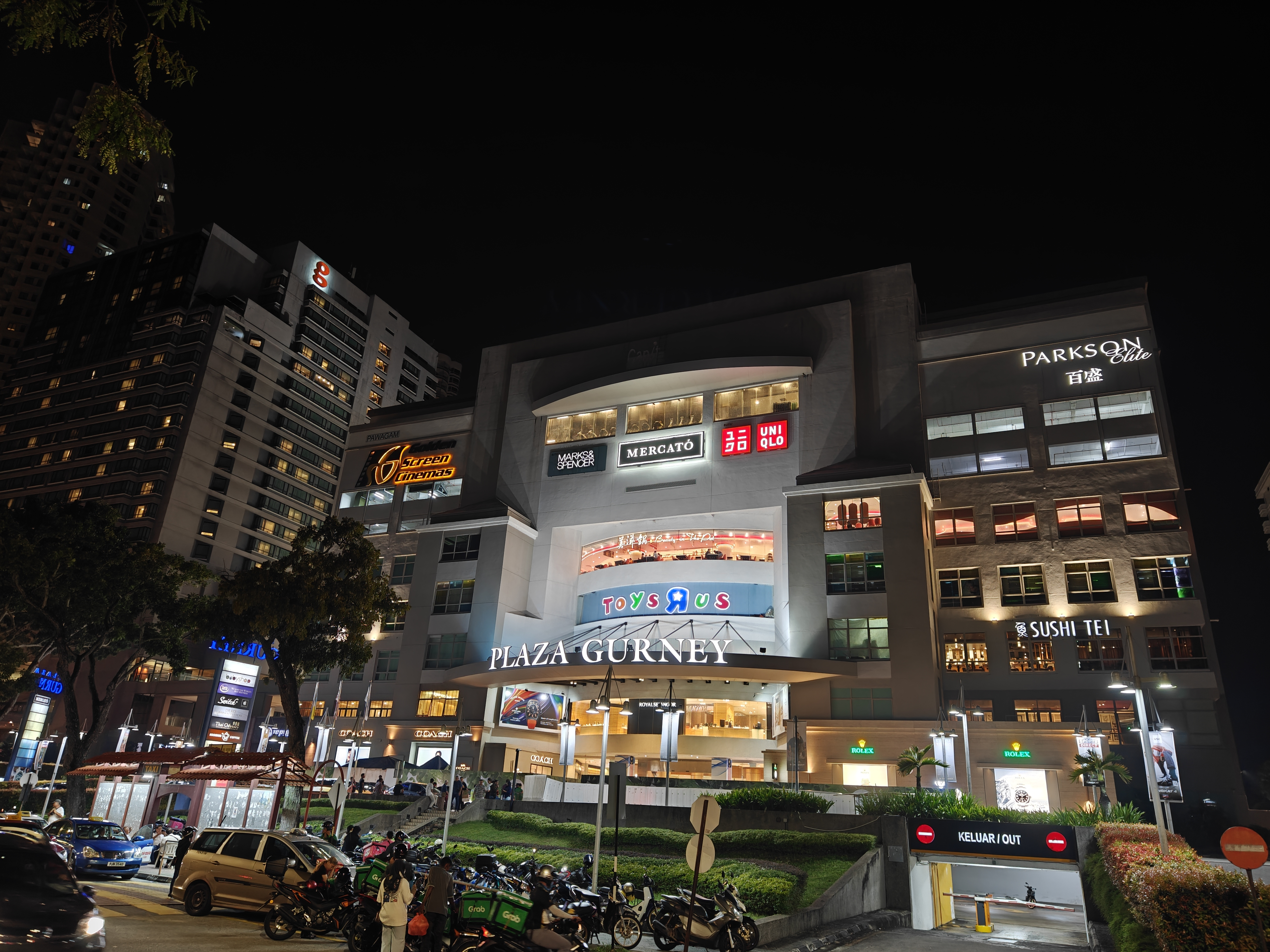
- Location: George Town, Penang, Malaysia
- Coordinates: 5.438176°N 100.309822°E
- Opened: November 2001; 25 years ago
- Manager: CapitaMalls Malaysia Trust
- Owner: CapitaMalls Malaysia Trust
- Num. of stores: 380
- Num. of anchor tenants: 1 (Parkson)
- Floor area: 889,859 sq ft (82,670.6 m^{2})
- Floors: 9 including two basement carpark and two multi-storey carpark.
- Website: gurneyplaza.com.my

Gurney Plaza is a shopping mall within George Town in the Malaysian state of Penang. Located at Gurney Drive within the city's Central Business District (CBD), it was opened in November 2001 and is now managed by CapitaMalls Asia, a subsidiary of the Singapore-based CapitaLand. Its main anchor tenant is Parkson, while Golden Screen Cinemas operates the largest multiplex in northern Malaysia within the top floor of the mall.

Gurney Plaza contains 380 shop lots spread out over nine floors which include 2 basement car park and 2 multi-storey car park. The mall has attracted various established international brands, making it one of the major retail and lifestyle hubs in Penang.

== Retail outlets ==
The mall consists of nine retail floors and 889,859 sq ft (82,670.6 m^{2}) of net lettable area, the largest of all shopping malls in George Town. Aside from Parkson, its main anchor tenant, Gurney Plaza contains a wide variety of well-known international brands. These include book stores like Popular, fashion names such as Marks & Spencer, Armani, Calvin Klein, Giordano, HLA, Kate Spade, Dockers, Hugo Boss, Tommy Hilfinger, Levi's, and Uniqlo, retail flagship/concept stores such as Padini and Brands Outlet (part of Padini), accessory firms such as Omega, Rado, Rolex, Tag Heuer, Pandora, Lovisa, and Swarovski, notable British sports fashion retailers JD Sports and Sports Direct, and the supermarket chain Mercato (formerly Cold Storage).

In addition, several restaurants, cafes, and food stalls can be found inside Gurney Plaza. Some of its restaurants are notably arranged along an outdoor alfresco space. Also, there's a food court owned and operated by the mall itself called Gurney Food Hall, which has varieties of local food options (and some foreign delicacies).

== Entertainment ==
Gurney Plaza has a variety of entertainment options. The most well-known of all is the Golden Screen Cinemas at the top floor, with 12 cineplexes. Opened in 2004, it is Golden Screen Cinemas' largest multiplex within northern Malaysia.

A karaoke joint operated by Red Box is also located at the top floor, adjacent to the aforementioned cinema. Other options include a rock-climbing gym (Project Rock Gurney) and a Toys "R" Us store.

== See also ==
- List of shopping malls in Malaysia
