= Sunrise Tower, Penang =

Condominium in George Town, Penang, Malaysia

Sunrise Tower
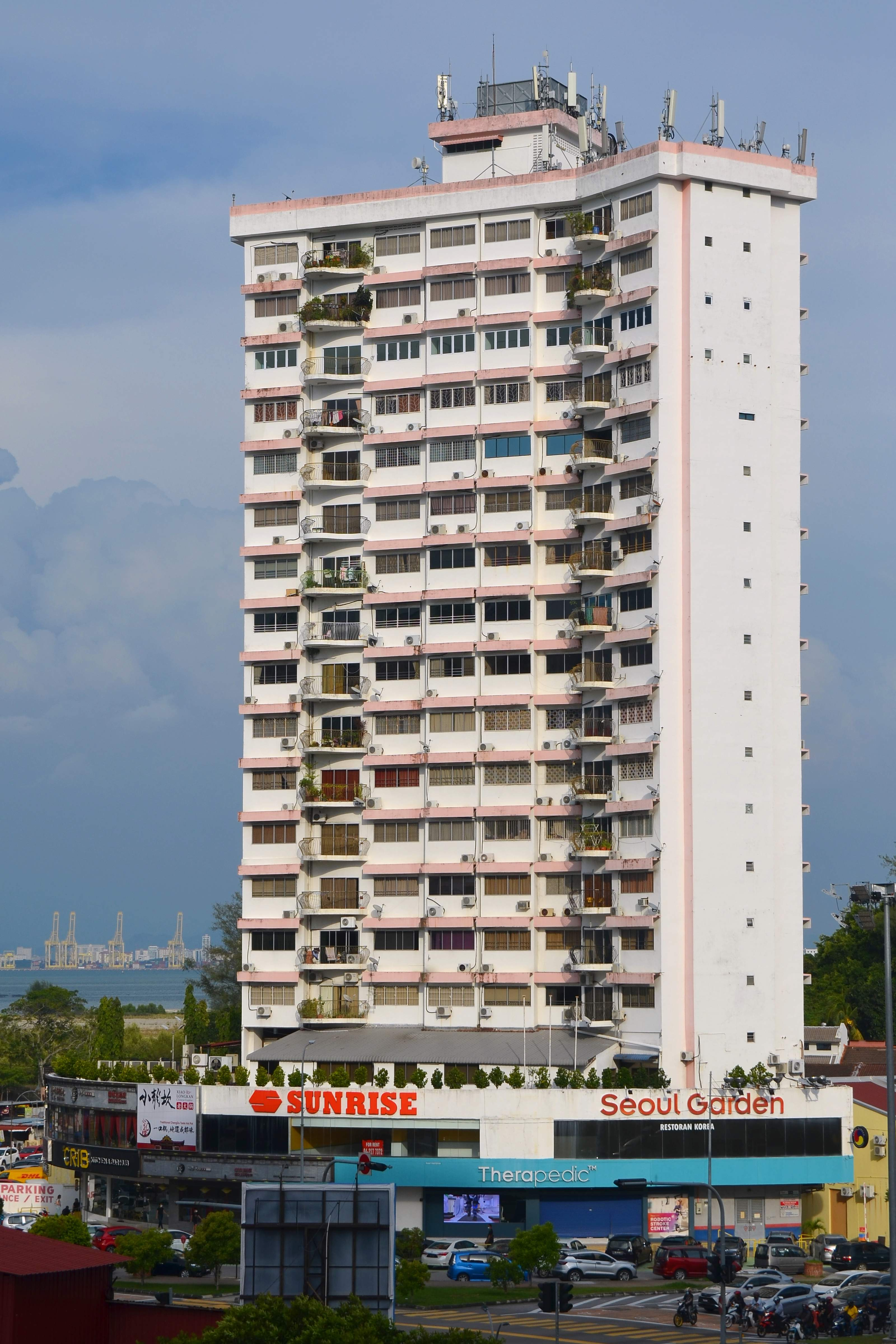

General information
- Location: Gurney Drive, 10250 George Town, Penang, Malaysia, George Town, Penang, Malaysia
- Coordinates: 5.4398°N 100.3082°E
- Opened: 1977

Height
- Top floor: 18

Technical details
- Floor count: 18

Sunrise Tower is an 18-storey condominium within George Town in the Malaysian state of Penang. Located at Gurney Drive within the city's Central Business District (CBD), the building was completed in 1977, becoming the first condominium along the seafronting street and the tallest building in the city prior to the completion of Komtar.

== History ==
The 18-storey Sunrise Tower was built in 1977. It was the first condominium to be constructed at Gurney Drive and before the completion of Komtar in 1986, was the tallest building in George Town.

The building includes a commercial podium, which housed the first McDonald's restaurant in Penang in 1989. The McDonald's outlet ceased operations in 2016 and shortly after, Wendy's opened its first Malaysian restaurant outside the Klang Valley within the same space. However, in 2019, Wendy's announced its withdrawal from the Malaysian market, resulting in the closure of the restaurant at Sunrise Tower.
