= Commission for the Pacification of Larut =

The Commission for the Pacification of Larut, whose terms of reference, among others, was to arrange for an amicable settlement relating to the Larut tin mines, was established by Sir Andrew Clarke on 23 January 1874. The members of the Pacification Commission included Captain Samuel Dunlop, Frank Swettenham, William A. Pickering, John Frederick Adolphus McNair, Chung Keng Quee and Chin Seng Yam. The Commission was successful in freeing many women taken as captives during the Larut Wars (1862–73), getting stockades dismantled and getting the tin mining business going again. The commission's labours concluded in February, 1874.

The Commissioners after due investigation and deliberation decided to hand the mines in Klian Pauh (Taiping) over to the Hai San Secret Society and the mines in Klian Bharu (Kamunting) to the Ghee Hin Kongsi.

Commenting on the role of the Perak Council, Richard James Wilkinson wrote,

"It is for the reader, in the light of subsequent events, to judge how far the Councillors were right or wrong, and to see for himself who really did the pioneer work of building up the prosperity of Perak. In the published accounts of British rule in Malaya, sufficient prominence has not always been given to the efforts of these early pioneers; the reaper, intent on his own work, is apt to forget the man who sowed. These Council Minutes are the record of the work of the sowers. A study of that record will show how much the State owes to Sir Hugh Low and to his fellow-Councillors, especially Raja Dris (the present Sultan), Sir William Maxwell, and the Chinese towkays, Ah Kwi [Chung Keng Quee] and Ah Yam."
