= William A. Pickering =

British colonial administrator (1840–1907)

William Alexander Pickering CMG
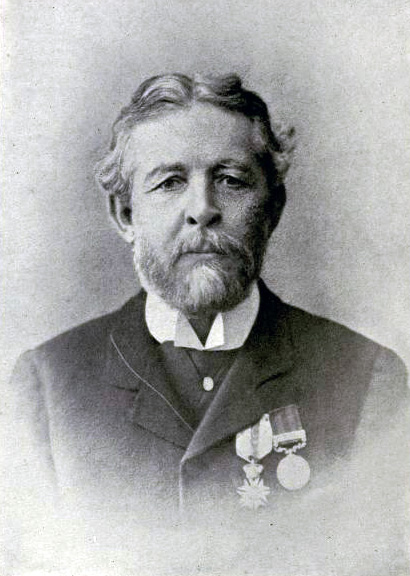

Protectorate of Chinese
- In office 3 May 1877 – 4 May 1899

Personal details
- Born: 9 June 1840 Eastwood, Nottinghamshire, England
- Died: 26 January 1907 (aged 66) San Remo, Italy

William Alexander Pickering CMG (9 June 1840 – 26 January 1907) was the first Protector appointed on 3 May 1877 by the British government to administer the Chinese Protectorate in colonial Singapore. He was the first European official in Singapore who could speak fluent Mandarin and Hokkien and gained the trust of many of the Singapore Chinese. His efforts went a long way towards controlling the problems posed by the secret societies then. Pickering Street in Singapore's Chinatown is named after him.

== Career ==
Pickering served a 10-year term in Hong Kong's Chinese Maritime Customs Service and picked up Mandarin, the official language of Qing Government, Cantonese and a number of southern Chinese dialects such as Hakka, Hokkien, Foochew, and Teochew.

Previously, Pickering had worked in the Chinese Imperial Maritime Customs in Fuzhou and Qing era Formosa (Taiwan), and wrote an account of his time in Taiwan called Pioneering in Formosa.

Once in Singapore, Pickering was appalled at how Chinese dialect translations of European officials referred to judges as "demons", police as "big dogs" and Europeans in general as "red-haired demons". There were also 'post office riots' between the Hokkiens and Teochews over who had the right to send money and letters back to China. An unusual technique he employed to quell the riots was to walk up and down the streets playing his bagpipes. This unusual sight often subdued the Chinese onlookers. Pickering, with his command of dialects, would then help to sort out the differences.

=== Larut Wars and the Pangkor Treaty ===
Approaching the end of the Larut Wars, incoming Governor of the Straits Settlements Andrew Clarke sent Pickering to Penang to negotiate with the Ghee Hin leadership. Pickering carried a letter from Tan Kim Ching, a member of Ghee Hin Kongsi based in Singapore, whom Clarke consulted with along his executive council, advocating peace with access to Larut with neither Ghin Hin or Hai San Secret Society being excluded. In Penang, the Ghee Hin headmen read the letter and agreed to surrender their forces in seven days time. Pickering also spoke with Kapitan Cina Chung Keng Quee for Hai San.

Pickering met the explorer Captain Speedy in Larut, who envied him for his ability to both speak Mandarin and play the bagpipes.

Three days after the signing of the Pangkor Treaty of 1874, Pickering was appointed a member of Commission for the Pacification of Larut also comprising Captain S. Dunlop, John Frederick Adolphus McNair, Frank Swettenham, Chung Keng Quee and Chin Seng Yam, whose terms of reference, among others, was to arrange for an amicable settlement relating to the Larut tin mines. The Commissioners after due investigation and deliberation decided to hand the mines in Klian Pauh (Taiping) over to the Hai San and the mines in Klian Bharu (Kamunting) to the Ghee Hin.

=== Chinese Protector ===
In 1876, an official British report into secret society activities was published. One recommendation in this report was that every coolie-to-be who arrived at Boat Quay should first encounter a British official who could speak his language and let the immigrant know that "there was an officer of the Government whose special duty is to protect and befriend him". In May 1877, Pickering was appointed for this job under the title of "Protector of Chinese" and his office was located in a small shophouse along North Canal Road, Singapore known as the Protectorate of Chinese.

In 1887, Pickering was attacked by a Teochew carpenter, Chua Ah Siok, who was sent by one of the secret societies, the Ghee Hok Society, to kill him in retaliation for Pickering's constant meddling in business. Chua walked up to Pickering's desk and threw an axe at him. The butt end of the axe blade struck Pickering on the forehead, causing serious injury, but Pickering survived.

Pickering also was attacked by a snake. In 1887, an assassin reportedly tried to kill him by sending a box to his office that contained a poisonous viper. Pickering managed to avoid death — some versions say the snake was discovered before it harmed him, others that he narrowly escaped when it tried to strike, while even some said the snake suffocated due to a lack of oxygen in it.

Pickering retired as Protector in 1889.

=== Assignment in Negeri Sembilan ===
Pickering was sent to Sungei Ujong, Negeri Sembilan by the British authorities in Malacca to intervene militarily in a leadership tussle in Sungai Ujong to preserve British economic interests. An agreement was eventually brokered by Pickering and the signing of the agreement was witnessed by Pickering.

== Death ==
Due to complications from the axe attack by Chua, Pickering died on 26 January 1907.

== Honours ==
Pickering was appointed a Companion of the Order of St Michael and St George (CMG) in the 1884 Birthday Honours.
