= Chung Keng Quee =

Malaysian businessman (1827–1901)

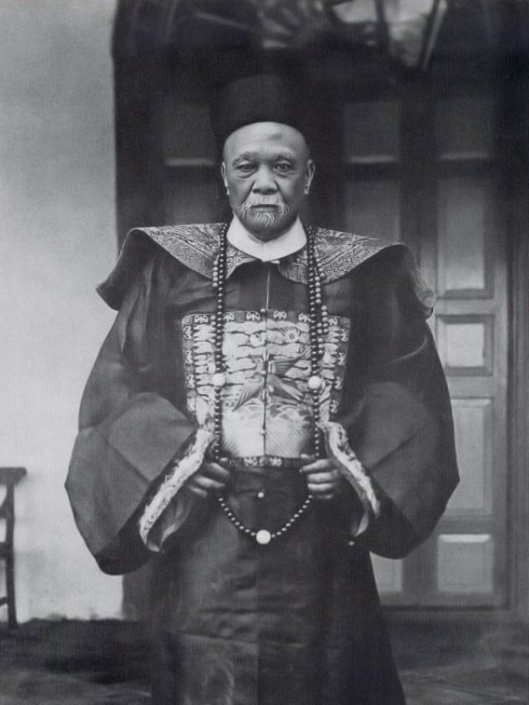
- Traditional Chinese: 鄭景貴
- Simplified Chinese: 郑景贵
Transcriptions
Standard Mandarin
- Hanyu Pinyin: Zhèng Jǐngguì
- Wade–Giles: Cheng Ching-kuei
Hakka
- Romanization: Chang5 Gin3-gui5
- Pha̍k-fa-sṳ: Chhang Kín-kui
Yue: Cantonese
- Yale Romanization: Jehng Gíng-gwai
- Jyutping: Zeng6 Ging2-gwai3
Southern Min
- Hokkien POJ: Tēⁿ kéng-kùi
- Tâi-lô: Tēnn Kíng-kùi

Kapitan China Chung Keng Quee (traditional Chinese: 鄭景貴; simplified Chinese: 郑景贵; pinyin: Zhèng Jǐngguì; Pe̍h-ōe-jī: Tēⁿ Kéng-kùi; Pha̍k-fa-sṳ: Chhang Kín-kui, 1827 – 13 December 1901) was the founder and administrator of modern Taiping in Perak, Malaysia. Appointed "Capitan China" by the British in 1877, he was a millionaire philanthropist and known as an innovator in the mining of tin. He was involved in many other industries including farming, pawnbroking and logging. He was respected by both Chinese and European communities in the early colonial settlement. His survival in the chaotic era owes much to his standing as leader of the Hai San, a Chinese secret society in British Malaya during the time of the Larut Wars (1862–73), a position he is said to have held until early 1884, although in all probability he continued to remain a leading member. The old fort at Teluk Batu was built by him to safeguard the mine that he opened there.

He was a member of the Commission for the Pacification of Larut and sat as one of six members of the Advisory Perak State Council appointed by the British.

== Early life ==
Third among his father's five sons, Chung was born into a peasant Hakka family in Xin Cun (新村) village, Cheng Sheng (Zengcheng 增城) county of Guangdong province, China.

It is believed that in 1841, he journeyed from China to British Malaya in a junk, sent by his mother, Madam Lai, to look for his father, Chung, Hsing Fah (Chung, Xingfa 郑兴发; Hakka: Chang Hin Fatt). He had left his wife (Madam Lin) in China to look after his elderly mother. He is thought to have been 20 years of age at that time.

At the time of his death the Perak Pioneer & Native States Advertiser Vol. VIII Taiping Saturday 14 December 1901 reports:

"Precise information as to the date of his arrival in Perak is difficult to obtain but it is apparently certain that he has passed over forty-five years in the State before he retired to Penang."

Chung Hsing Fa, had come to Malaya as an indentured labourer during a time of great turbulence in China to make a living and support his family in China (see First and Second Opium Wars and Taiping Rebellion). After some time when Madam Lai received no news from her husband she sent Chung Keng Seng (鄭景勝 / 郑景胜), her second son. Still receiving no news, she then sent Keng Quee. When Keng Quee arrived in Perak, he discovered that both his father Hsing Fa and his brother Keng Seng were by that time well established in business. In fact, Keng Seng was so popular he was known as Lui Kong Seng (literally Thunder God Seng). His father, Hsing Fa was one of the early leaders of the Tseng Lung association on King Street. Keng Quee entered the mining business which his father and brother were engaged in.

By 1860 he controlled the Penang-based Hai San Secret Society as well as the Larut tin-fields the Hai San were associated with. Information about his career before that time is generally unknown.

== Names ==
Chung's name has been spelt in many different ways due to differences of dialect and transliteration. Apart from Chung Keng Quee, the name has also been spelt Cheng Ching-kuei, Chang Ching-kuei, Chung Keng Kwee and Chang Ah Quee (traditional Chinese: 鄭亞貴; simplified Chinese: 郑亚贵; pinyin: Zhèng Yàguì). Chung has also been spelt Chang, Chan, Cheng, Cheang. Keng has also been spelt Chin, Kung, King etc. Quee has also been spelt Kooi, Kwee, Kwi, Kuei and Kui. He has also been known as Teh Keng Quee (Zheng4 is Teh in Hokkien), Ah Quee, Ah Kwi, Ah Kooi etc. Upon receiving his honorary title from the Chinese Imperial Court, he took to using the "fancy" names Cheng Sheng Chih (慎之), Cheang Shin Thong and Cheng Ssu-Wen (traditional Chinese: 鄭嗣文; simplified Chinese: 郑嗣文).

== Business interests ==
Chung was involved in many different businesses but he was first and foremost a tin man. Not only did he help his sons start out in the business, he was apt to support others as well. Between 1884 and 1889, Chung sublet a part the land granted to him for his mining activities to a young man starting out in the business, Foo Choo Choon.

=== Mining business ===
Around 1848, Malay Chief 'Che Long Ja'afar introduced Chinese miners to Larut (spelt Laroot or Larot at that time). The original mine field, Klian Pauh is where the jail at Taiping stands today. Long Ja'afar appointed Low Sam from Penang as agent and Low Sam was associated with Chung.

According to Chung, in his evidence provided to the Straits Government, the development of the Larut tin fields was initiated by Malay Chief 'Che Long Ja'afar by advancing money to the Chinese miners in his district to work the mines and it was only in his son Ngah Ibrahim's time (c. 1858–74) that the Chinese worked the mines with their own money.

At a time when Ngah Ibrahim was administrator of Larut, the Chinese had increased in number and in early 1860 two large groups were formed by the Chinese, the "Five Associations" whose members worked in the mines of Klian Pauh and the "Four Associations" whose members worked in the mines of Klian Baharu.

Mining rights were given to the Hakka "Five Associations" or Go-Kuan (Chinese: 五馆 or Chinese: 五群) (Hakka: Ng Khiun) and the Cantonese "Four Associations" or Si-Kuan (四馆). Chung was leader of the Hakka Go-Kuan and the Hai San Secret Society (Chinese: 海山) (Hakka: Hoi San) they were aligned with and began to operate his tin mines in Larut in the Larut, Matang and Selama District in 1860. Many Hakka fled China when the Taiping Rebellion broke out there and found work in the mines of Chung. Chung established his position over the mining area in Larut as leader of the Hai San from 1860 to 1884.

By 1879 there were 80 mines in operation in Larut, owned by 40 firms, with an average of nearly 86 men per mine. The largest mine of all in the country was owned by the Kong Loon Kongsi, in Kamunting, directed by Chung whom Doyle in Mining In Larut describes as:

"an enterprising Chinese gentleman whose appreciation of European appliances is envinced by a centrifugal pump and engine, in supersession of the cumbrous and comparatively useless, Chinese water-wheel."

The Kong Loon mine employed 300 coolies, more than any other mine at that time. Chung was a wealthy miner who (circa 1889 - 1895) was granted big mining concessions including 1,000 acres (405 ha) (4 km^{2}) in Kinta.

By 1887, Chung was the largest tin producer in Perak accounting for almost 29,000 pikuls or 1,700 tons out of a total state output of about 220,000 pikuls or about 13,000 tons—more than what all the foreign mines put together could produce.

In the early 1890s, Chung was reported to own some of the finest tin mines in Sorakai (Kinta) and Kota (Larut). The Government of India sanctioned the grant of a large concession in Mergui for him to prospect for tin. According to the Calcutta Correspondent of The Times, this was "the first attempt to encourage, on a large scale, the mining industry in Mergui."

According to the Ipoh Echo, Chung owned the largest alluvial tin mine in the world, the Kwong Lee Mine, which employed 5,000 mining coolies. The Singapore Free Press and Mercantile Advertiser reported, "The largest mine in Perak is aboiut to be closed, the produce having become too limited to be payable. This is the Kwong Lee mine of Kota, the property of Captain Ah Kwi. This excavation has been a show place for some time, and has been visited by many persons out of curiosity because of the large scale on which it has been carried on. It was feared, some few months back, that the mine would give out, and a number of the men employed were discharged. Since then, instead of improving, the wash has diminished in value, and the owner is obliged to relinquish it. It paid remarkably well at one time."

There are those who argue that his were the first true capitalist Chinese enterprises in the country and not those of Yap Ah Loy.

==== Larut Wars and Pangkor Treaty ====
As leader of the Hai San secret society, Chung played a central role in the Larut Wars (1861–1874), a series of wars between Hai San and Ghee Hin Kongsi over control of Larut's tin-mining districts. While the first of the Larut wars broke out over land and water rights, the rivalry between the two groups already existed in Ujong Salang, Selangor, Penang, Singapore and Kwangtung itself where both groups fought with each other between 1855 and 1868.

In August 1873, Archibald Edward Harbord Anson, the last Lieutenant-Governor of Penang, sought to bring about a ceasefire between the two parties and convened a meeting at the beginning of the month attended, apart from Anson, by Chung (Hai San), Ho Ghi Sui (Ghee Hin), Foo Tye Sin (pro-Hai San), Ngah Ibrahim (pro-Hai San), Raja Muda Abdullah of Perak (pro-Ghee Hin), Tengku Kudin (pro- Abdullah) and a British naval captain. The two sides agreed to keep the peace pending British arbitration with Ngah Ibrahim taking responsibility for the Hai San and Abdullah taking responsibility for the Ghee Hin. Abdullah failed to ensure Ghee Hin to keep the peace that the British were prompted to back Ngah Ibrahim and the Hai San.

Ngah Ibrahim's Penang residence was blown up on 16 September 1873. A week later, a similar attempt was made on Chung's house. Abdullah and his Ghee Hin cohorts were then arrested at sea and brought to Penang where they were eventually released but forbidden to return to Perak.

Approaching the end of the Larut Wars, incoming Governor of the Straits Settlements Andrew Clarke sent William A. Pickering to Penang to negotiate with the Ghee Hin leadership. Pickering carried a letter from Tan Kim Ching, a member of Ghee Hin Kongsi based in Singapore, whom Clarke consulted with along his executive council, advocating peace with access to Larut with neither Ghin Hin or Hai San Secret Society being excluded. In Penang, the Ghee Hin headmen read the letter and agreed to surrender their forces in seven days time. Pickering also spoke with Chung for Hai San.

According to British naval historian C. Northcote Parkinson in his book British Intervention in Malaya, 1867–1877, Clarke decided to summon the Chinese factions to a conference following a meeting on or about 9 January 1874 between Chung and Hai San headmen and (together with John Frederick Adolphus McNair and Samuel Dunlop) who had been sent to meet them at the mouth of the Larut River to persuade them to accept arbitration.

Over a week from 13 January to 20 January 1874, Clarke convened a conference aboard the Colonial Steamer Pluto anchored off Pangkor island. On 20 January, Chung was one of the principal Chinese signatories to the Pangkor Treaty of 1874, which ended the Larut Wars and the disputed succession of the sultanship of Perak. Chung and Chin Ah Yam, leaders of the Hai San and Ghee Hin, respectively, were ennobled by the British with the title of Kapitan China (leader of the Chinese community) and the town of Larut was renamed Taiping ("太平" in Chinese, meaning "everlasting peace") as a confirmation of the new state of truce.

Three days afterwards, Chung was appointed a member of Commission for the Pacification of Larut also comprising Captain S. Dunlop, John Frederick Adolphus McNair, Frank Swettenham, Pickering and Chin Seng Yam, whose terms of reference, among others, was to arrange for an amicable settlement relating to the Larut tin mines. The Commissioners after due investigation and deliberation decided to hand the mines in Klian Pauh (Taiping) over to Hai San and the mines in Klian Bharu (Kamunting) to the Ghee Hin.

Chung and Chin Seng Yam (Chin Ah Yam) having made peace with each other became fast friends, with Chin becoming the godfather of Chung's fourth son, Chung Thye Phin.

==== Innovation and leadership ====
Chung was the first miner to experiment with hydraulic machinery. He was a progressive miner, farsighted and innovative and this together with his close relationship with Low helped spur on the economic development of the territory.

In 1878 on a visit to his mines at Larut, William Cleaver Francis Robinson the Governor of the Straits Settlements (1877–1879), was impressed to see a steam pump, installed by the Perak Government at Chung's request on the undertaking that if successful it would be taken over and rented by the mine.

Low introduced the portable steam pump for draining mines in the protected states in 1878 by first demonstrating its usefulness in Chung's mines. Convinced by the practical results of a real demonstration, owners of large mines in Perak, Selangor and Sungei Ujong soon had similar pumps installed, overcoming the periodic problem of flooding that used to bring work at the mines to a virtual standstill.

=== Revenue farming ===
By 1888 he held the General Farm (taxes upon gambling, spirits and pawnbroking) of Kuala Kangsar, the North and South Larut Coast Farm and the Opium Farm of Lower Perak. In 1890 he obtained the Penang Opium Farm. By 1891 he had the Kinta General Farm and the General Farm and Opium Duty Farm of Kuala Kangsar and in 1895 he had the General Farm of Perak and the Coast and Opium Farms of Lower Perak. He acquired the Kinta General Farm in August 1890 at a considerably reduced price.

In 1889, after the Pangkor settlement of 1874, Sir Hugh Low, British Resident at Perak, gave over most of the Larut and Kurau opium, gambling, spirits, pawnbroking and tobacco farms to Chung and his business partner, Khoo, Thean Teik. In Penang, Chung and his friends and relatives made up one of three similar syndicate groups that dominated the Opium Farms there.

Chung apart from being a man of vision was also a great risk-taker. Sir Hugh Low in his own notes describing negotiations over the leasing out of the Perak revenue farms compares Chung and Khoo Thian Teik. Chung had told him that he needed five thousand more coolies to make the venture successful while Khoo Thian Teik had talked of two or three hundred more. Not only did he get his coolies from China, Ah Quee also employed coolies from India.

His exceptional management of the revenue farms entrusted to him helped bring fresh capital into Perak and helped him to become, by 1886, the largest financier in Larut.

While he obviously was making a lot of money from revenue farming, in 1897 Sir Hugh Low, then the Resident, negotiated with Chung who was at that time owner of the largest mine in the country and probably the most influential financier of tin mines in the country, to abolish the supply of opium in return for greater protection of tin mine employers from their absconding coolies and for longer working hours.

From 1880 to 1897, in partnership with the Tan, Yeoh, Lim, Cheah, and Khoo families, Chung invested over $2.8 million to dominate all the revenue farms from upper to lower Perak.

=== Tobacco farming ===
Chung had many tobacco farms in several areas in Perak, including Larut, Kuala Kangsar, Kerian and Selama. Together with Chen Eok he held the tobacco farms in Larut and Larut Coast between 1883 and 1885.

=== Sri Sarawak ===
Chung had a screw steamer, the Sri Sarawak, that plied a route between the Larut river and Penang. This vessel is mentioned in various documents of the time including personal journals. Emily Sadka in the Journal of Sir Hugh Low, Perak, 1877, remarks about an unflattering description of the craft given in Isabella Bird's The Golden Chersonese (and the way thither) p 277 but the unflattering part of Bird's description that Sadka referred to was actually about the pier and not the boat. What Bird said about the Sri Sarawak was that it is "a small but very useful Chinese trading steamer".

=== Reputation for business success ===
Chung formed close relationships with the many British Residents of Perak and built a reputation for making mining operations a success. Ernest Woodford Birch, seventh British Resident to Perak, left in February 1897 to take up the post of Acting British Resident, Negeri Sembilan and on 15 March 1897, while paying visits of inspection to various parts of the Negri Sembilan, recorded in his papers "I wish we could induce Captain Ah Kwi, of Perak, to enter Lukut and Labu".

=== Succession ===
Upon Chung's death in 1901, his business activities were managed by his son Chung Thye Phin.

== Properties ==
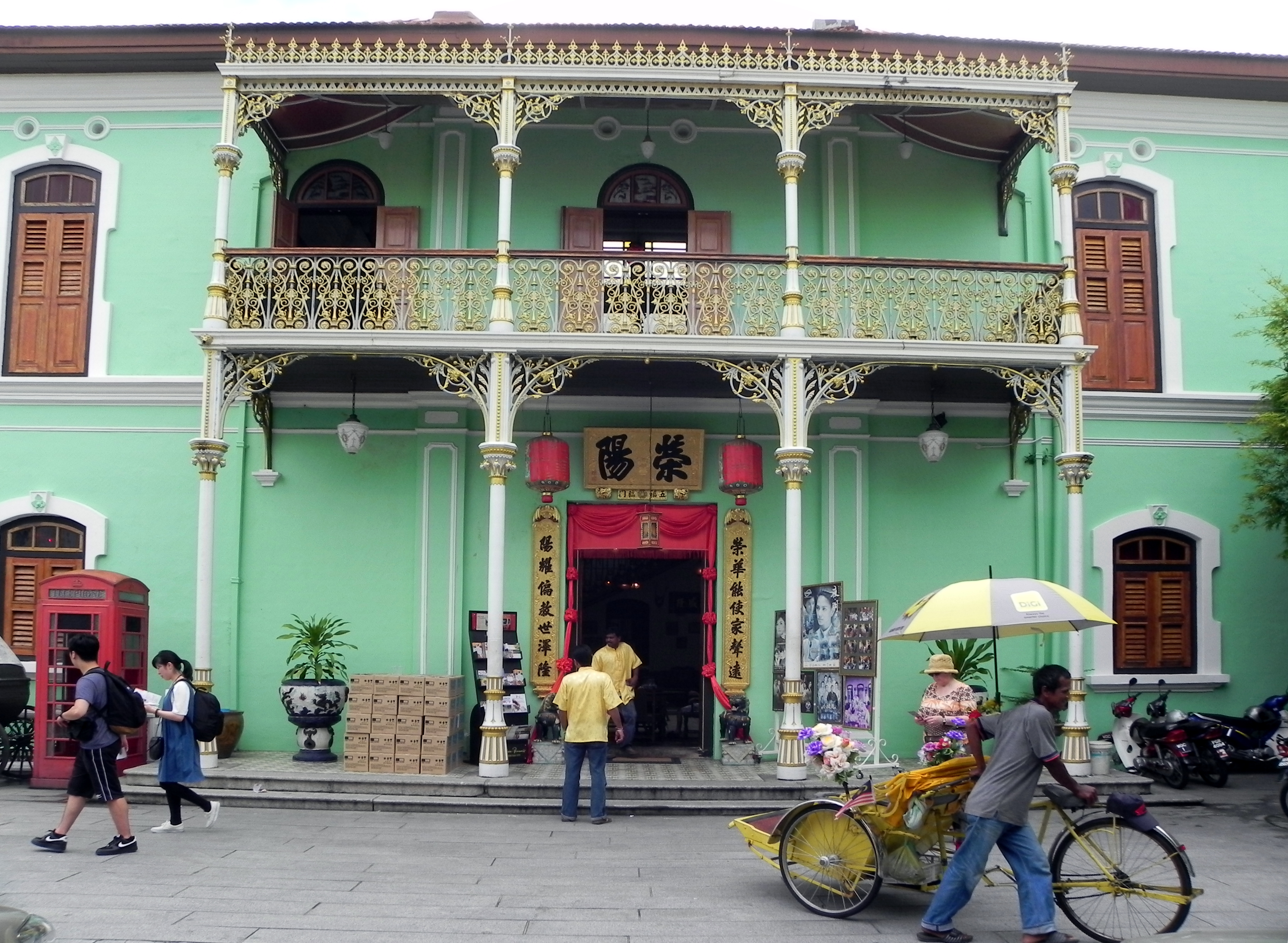
Pinang Peranakan Mansion, or Hye Kee Chan

In 1893, Chung acquired two adjacent properties along Church Street on Penang Island. The first was the former headquarters of the Ghee Hin after the Hai San had ousted them in the 1870s. The second was a Chinese school, the Goh Hock Tong (or Ng Fook Tong in Cantonese) meaning Five Luck Villa. He offered the school an alternative site in Chulia Street, where a new building was completed in 1898.

Chung converted the former Ghee Hin headquarters into his townhouse and office and named this, Hye Kee Chan, or Sea Remembrance Hall. It has interior fittings including Victorian cast iron columns from W MacFarlane & Co. Ltd, better known as the Saracen Foundry.

Hye Kee Chan is now more commonly known as the Pinang Peranakan Mansion. Open to the public, it serves as a museum showcasing the lifestyle, customs and traditions of the Peranakans or Straits Chinese - an example of adaptive reuse.

Macfarlane was also responsible for the iron gates and fencing of the former Five Luck Villa building. The building became a private family school and was named 慎之學塾 (Shen-chih hsueh-shu) after his fancy name 慎之 (Shen-chih) and 學塾 meaning a private family school or study.

In the private family school stands a life-size bronze statue of Chung. The statue was commissioned by the Engineers' Institute that he had generously donated a new building to. It was created by Benjamin Creswick and a facsimile of it was shown at the Royal Academy of Arts in 1903. On the base of the statue will be found the signature of Benjamin Creswick, and an imprint, Broad and Sons, the bronze founders in Birmingham who cast the statue.

== Political career ==
Sir Hugh Low established the Perak State Council in 1877. Chung was appointed a member of the State Council of Perak (there were six members of the council, four Malays and two Chinese) which held its first meeting at Kuala Kangsar on 10 September 1877. The other members of the Council present were Raja Yussof (the Raja Muda), Sir Hugh Low (Resident), Captain Tristram Speedy (Assistant Resident), Raja Dris', Orang Kaya Temenggong, and Kapitan Chin Seng yam, Che Karim of Selama being absent.

Chung's magnanimity is manifestly clear from the Council Minutes of Perak in "Papers on Malay Subjects" by Richard James Wilkinson, F. M. S. (Federation of Malay States) Government Press, Kuala Lumpur, 1908.

Chung's son, Chung Thye Phin, (then only 22 years of age) was appointed to take over his seat on the Perak State Council in 1900. When Chung Thye Phin resigned his seat in the council, his nephew, Chung Kok Ming, took over his seat.

== Philanthropy ==
Chung was a philanthropist and had made many donations, subscriptions and sponsorships. Together with Cheong Fatt Tze, Chang Yu Nan, Cheah Choon Seng and Tye Kee Yoon, he was part of a group referred to as The Five Great Sponsors. According to historian Lau-Fong Mak, who says he "is indisputably the century's biggest patron of all," Chung alone accounted for about 92% of the charitable contributions made by the sole three members of the Cantonese-Hakka economic elite between the years 1850 and 1910.

=== Education ===
Chung had donated to the Free School ($12,000) and the Brother's School ($6,000).

==== Support for poor scholars in China ====
In the absence of Malayan citizenship laws during that time, Chung occasionally visited his home village in China. In commemoration of the birthday of his mother, Madam Lai, Chung founded and endowed a big scholarship fund for poor Chinese scholars preparing themselves for the imperial examination.

==== Five Luck Villa: school for all Chinese dialect groups ====
Chung was a principal director of Ng Fook Hsu Yin (Wufu School) in Penang. In 1893, Chung, already a millionaire, built a Chinese school in Penang, for all the Chinese children regardless of their dialects. Having bought over the property in Church Street where the school (the Five Luck Villa also called Goh Hock Tong, Ng Fook Tong and the United Association of Cantonese Districts) was originally located, Chung identified a new site for the school in Chulia Street.

The board membership was made up of four secretaries and 209 assistant secretaries. Chung was its chief secretary. There were nearly 1,300 donors who gave between 1 and 5760 yuan. The largest amount, as well as the building site were donated by Chung. On top of his donations, Chung also gave a loan of 20,000 yuan towards the construction of the new building. The Ch'ien-i bank-society was set up by leading members of the community for this purpose and members of the society invested at least 30 cents a month for 36 months and the interest on these deposits as on the capital were used to repay the Chung's loan. 175 people deposited amounts from 15 yuan to 816 yuan (from Chung himself). The new building was completed in 1898.

==== St. Xavier's Institution ====
In 1895, the St. Xavier's Institution was replaced by a grander Baroque-style double-storey building, erected by Chung together with Gan Hong Kee, and Lim Ah Kye (the latter two posthumously). The building's inauguration took place on 28 November, where Chung and the acting Resident Councillor of Penang, Henry Trotter, were guests of honour.

==== Chong Wen She Institute ====
In March 1901, just months before he died, Chung and several other members of the Hakka Associations in Penang established an educational institution, Chong Wen She (崇文社). The institution organised campaigns to encourage the Chinese in Penang to respect education. The motto of the campaigns was "Jing Xi Zi Zhi" or to respect the words written on the paper. The institution established a free of charge private school for all the children irrespective of their dialects. The school also enrolled the locally born Chinese children with the intention of giving them a classical education so that they would not forget about their roots.

=== Religion ===
==== Tua Pek Kong Temples in Tanjung Tokong and King Street, Penang ====
Chung was a principal donor to the Haichu-yu (Sea Pearl) Tua Pek Kong Temple (1865 and 1868) in Tanjung Tokong, Penang. Chung's donation of 150 yuan for the restoration of the temple is inscribed in a stone set up on the occasion, dated 1865 or early 1866 and kept at the Tua Pek Kong Temple in King Street, Penang, which the Tanjung Tokong temple is connected to. The lowest amount recorded is two yuan and the highest is 250 yuan. His donation of 30 yuan is inscribed in a stone (1868) set up by board members of the King Street Tua Pek kong Temple to commemorate the gilding and varnishing of the temple. On the stone he is referred to as Chou T'ung, First Class Assistant Department Magistrate. Two other donors are called Kung-yuan, Senior Licentiate.

==== Kwangtung and Teochew Cemeteries, Mount Erskine, Penang ====
Chung was the primary benefactor of the Guangdong/Kwangtung and Tingchou/Teochew Cemeteries (1885 and 1901). At the Kwangtung and Tingchou Cemeteries (Kuang-tung chi T'ing-chou i-shan cemetery for Kuangtung and T'ing-chou Prefecture of Fukien is located in Mount Erskine Road) Chung's donation of 600 yuan towards the construction of a hall for funeral ceremonies is inscribed in a stone dated 1885. Donations ranged from 600 to 10 yuan. A donation of land to the cemetery by Chung and his daughter Kang Neoh (also spelt Keng-niang and Huang Jiang) is recorded in one of two similar stones. One of a set of three stone inscriptions dated 1901 records the 600 yuan donation of Chung (made during the period from 1898 to 1900) as well as the position of secretary held under the name of Hye Kee Chan (Hai-chi chan 海记栈), his company. Chung headed the list of over 250 donors most of whom donated amounts ranging from 100 to 5 yuan.

==== Kek Lok Si, Penang ====
At Kek Lok Si, on an inscription in stone dated 1906 listing the particulars of donors, it is recorded that Cheng Ssu-wen (Chung) with honorary second rank, donated 6,000 yuan, the 5th largest donation. Another stone inscription, this one dated 1907 recording the origin and development of the temple, shows that Cheng Ssu-wen (Chung) was one of the six senior secretaries of the temple at that time. He was one of the five wealthy patrons from Penang whom Beow Lian convinced (between 1887 and 1891) to form the core support for the construction of the temple, after having selected the site in Ayer Itam. With this, Chung became a director or Da Zongli (Great Prime Minister) of the new temple.

==== Perak Temples ====
Chung was one of the principal donors to the construction of the Yueh-ting ku-miao/Sam-wang tien, Kamunting in the late 1850s and heads the list of donors for the construction of the Sui-ching po miao in Matang in 1883.

=== Clan and dialect associations ===
==== Chung Association, Penang ====
The Teh Kongsi or Teh Si Eng Eong Tong (鄭氏滎陽堂 / 郑氏荥阳堂) or Zhengshi Ying Yang Tang in Penang was first founded by Zheng Jinggui (Chung) in Kimberley Street. Chung in the Hockien dialect is Teh.

==== Penang Chinese Town Hall ====
He became the prominent president (1881–1883) of the Penang Chinese Town Hall (also known as P'ing-chang hui-kuan P'I'I, P'ing-chang kung-kuan or its current official Chinese name, Hua-jen ta-hui-t'ang). Chung was a major donor towards the founding of the town hall (600 yuan) according to the inscription on a stone dated 1886 kept within the town hall.

==== Founder of the Guangdong Association in Taiping ====
The Kwantung hui-kuan (Guangdong Association) along Temple Street in Taiping was founded in 1887 by Chung and others as an association of people from Kuangtung (Guangdong) province in South China.

==== Penang Tseng Ch'eng Association ====
The Straits Settlements Factory Records show that the association was headed by Chung Ah Yat and had 16 members in 1825. It was largely an inactive association until 1849 when Chung and others put up a new building for it.

==== Tseng Lung Association ====
While he lived, he was a patron and benefactor to the Tseng-Lung Hui-kuan in Penang, Taiping and Gopeng. Chung built the current temple-like premises of the Tseng Lung (Zeng Long) Association in Taiping in 1888, rebuilt the premises of the Tseng-Lung Hui-kuan, Gopeng in 1898 and the premises of the Tseng-lung Hui-kuan, Penang in 1886. The Tseng Lung Hui Kuan were associations for people from Tseng ch'eng and Lung-men (Longmen 龙门) counties of Kuang-chou (Guangzhou or Canton) prefecture in South China. According to Tan Kim Hong, Chung whose father was an early leader of the association became the Chief Director of the association around 1890.

==== Establishing a road ====
When the Lim Ancestral Temple building on Beach Street was completed in 1866, the Kew Leong Tong (Hall of Nine Dragons) Lim Kongsi, one of the three Lim Clan Associations in Penang, moved its office there. The address was 234 Beach Street. Later, Ah Quee Street was established when Chung donated his Beach Street shophouse to be demolished to create the street that bears his name. Ah Quee Street runs beside 164 Beach Street which also happens to be the longest shophouse in Penang.

=== International charities ===
==== India Famine Relief Fund ====
In 1897 the British establishment tried to drum up support for an India famine-relief drive. Penang millionaire and Deli Bank director Hsieh Yung-kuan, then Chinese vice-consul, contributed $200 and Chung, Keng Kwee gave $300 more, completely dwarfing the Governor who managed only $100. (See also Indian famine of 1896–97)

==== Transvaal War Fund ====
On the twenty fourth day of collections for the Transvaal War Fund For Widows and Orphans Chung donated $1,000 bringing total for that day to $16,033. In March 1900 he donated $15,000 to the Transvaal War Fund (see Second Boer War), started in November 1899 by The Straits Times in connection with the South African War. For perspective the total amount collected was approximately $215,000 out of which $50,000 came from the government and $10,000 each came from Kapitan Yap Kuan Seng and Towkay Tet Shin.

==== Franco-Annam War Relief Fund ====
On many other occasions he also contributed to various other charities including the War Relief Fund arising from the Franco-Annam war (see Annam (French protectorate) and Sino-French War) under the command of Viceroy Li Hongzhang. He donated 100,000 taels to the Ching Government to support China's war efforts against the French in Indochina.

=== Host to China's Admiral Ting ===
In March 1894, Chung hosted in his gardens, in the name of Vice Consul Chang, Pi Shih (Cheong Fatt Tze), a dinner to welcome Admiral Ting (see Battle of Yalu River (1894) and Battle of Weihaiwei) and the Chinese Imperial Fleet of warships that he commanded. These included the King Yuen (Captain Lin Yang Hing) and the Ching Yuen (Captain Yih Choo Kwei).

=== Queen Victoria's Golden & Diamond Jubilees ===
"... his munificent gifts on such occasions as the two Jubilees of Her Late Majesty will not soon be forgotten."—The Perak Pioneer & Native States Advertiser VOL VIII Taiping Saturday 14 December 1901

=== Support for European engineers in Penang ===
The Engineers' Institute was probably the first of its kind in the country. Opened for the recreation and general use of the engineers who formed a large part of the European community (30%). Originally the institute occupied rooms in Beach Street but later moved to a beautiful double storey building presented by the Capitan Chung Kheng Kwi at the junction of Leith Street and Farquhar Street. On 5 March 1888, an institute was opened for the recreation and general convenience of European mechanical engineers. For some time membership was confined exclusively to engineers and mechanics but was so popular that before long the regulations were altered so as to include deck officers, and certain longshoremen. The growth and development of the institute proceeded so rapidly that larger buildings were soon required, and, by arrangement with Chung a new two-storey headquarters building was erected at the junction of Leith and Farquhar streets. Upon the staircase was a beautiful stained-glass window presented by Chung and bearing the inscription, "Erected by Captain Cheng Kheng Kwi, Perak and Pinang, 1901". Near at hand was a portrait of the donor.

== Personal life ==
Chung, had ten sons, the 4th and best known of whom was Chung Thye Phin. Chung had four principal wives or "t'sais", including Lim Ah Chen whom he married early in life in China, Tan Gek Im who survived him and Teng Nyong who was the mother of Chung Thye Phin. He also had a secondary wife or "t'sip" Tan Ah Loy, mother of his daughter Cheang Ah Soo. They bore him eight sons and 5 daughters.

He also had a child (Cheang, Thye Gan) (born 1893) alias Cheng Tai Kwong by a woman named Tye Thye. His eldest son, Thye Yong, was adopted.

=== Sons ===
Chi. Trad.	Chi. Simp.	Hanyu Pinyin	Hakka	Cantonese	Hockien	Other
1. 鄭大養	郑大养	Zhèng dà yăng (b. 1868, d. 20 October 1915)	chang5 tai5 iong1	zeng6 daai6 joeng5/6	Tēⁿ tāi iáng	Also Thye Yong, Ah Yong and Kon Yong. 1st child. Adopted.
2. 鄭大仁	郑大仁	Zhèng dà rén	chang5 tai5 in2	zeng6 daai6 jan4	Tēⁿ tāi jîn	1st son of China Wife, Lim Ah Chen.
3. 鄭大日	郑大日	Zhèng dà rì (d. 23 December 1917)	chang5 tai5 ngit7	zeng6 daai6 jat6	Tēⁿ tāi ji̍t	2nd son of China Wife, Lim Ah Chen. Cheang Thye Ngit, Tai Yat, Keng Tong Sek Shing, Tai Yet, Sik Shin, Thye Nghit, Chiang Thye Nghit
4. 鄭大昌	郑大昌	Zhèng dà chāng (b. 1883, d. 1920)	chang5 tai5 cong1	zeng6 daai6 coeng1	Tēⁿ tāi chhiong	Also Thye Cheong.
5. 鄭大平	郑大平	Zhèng dà píng (b. 28 September 1879, d. 29 March 1935)	chang5 tai5 pin2	zeng6 daai6 ping4 / zeng6 daai6 peng4	Tēⁿ tāi pêng	Also Thye Phin, Thye Pin. Son by Teng Nyong.
6. 鄭大元	郑大元	Zhèng dà yuán (b. 1881, d. 1921)	chang5 tai5 ngien2	zeng6 daai6 jyun4	Tēⁿ tāi gôan	Also Thye Yan. (Thye Fong?) Son by his third wife.
7. 鄭大詳	郑大详	Zhèng dà xiáng (b. 1885, d. 29 July 1907)	chang5 tai5 siong2	zeng6 daai6 coeng4 / zeng6 daai6 joeng4	Tēⁿ tāi siông	Also Thye Seong, Thye Shiong. Son by Tan Gek Im.
8. 鄭大金	郑大金	Zhèng dà jīn (d. 6 June 1933)	chang5 tai5 gim1	zeng6 daai6 gam1	Tēⁿ tāi kim	Also Thye Kam. 9th son
9. 鄭大興	郑大兴	Zhèng dà xīng	chang5 tai5 hin5 / hin1 / him5 / hin3	zeng6 daai6 jan3 / zeng6 daai6 hing1 / hing3 / jan6	Tēⁿ tāi hèng	Thye Hin
10. N/A	N/A	N/A (b. 1893)	N/A	N/A	N/A	Cheang Thye Gan alias Cheng Tai Kwong, his son by Thye Tai.

==== Chung Thye Siong ====
Chung Thye Siong (1855–1907) was born in Penang, educated at both the Penang Free School and St. Xavier's Institution and went on to join two important lineages by marrying (1893) Koh Chooi Peng, eldest daughter of Kaw Cheng Sian (辜禎善 / 辜祯善) who in turn was the son of Koh Seang Tat a descendant of Koh Lay Huan, the first Kapitan China of Penang. He helped in the management of his father's estate and lived in his father's residence in Church Street.

=== Daughters ===
Chi. Trad.	Chi. Simp.	Hanyu Pinyin	Hakka	Cantonese	Hokkien	Other
鄭連心	郑连心	Zhèng lián xīn	chang5 lien2 sim1	zeng6 lin4 sam1	Tēⁿ liân sim	Also Lin Sim.
鄭連英	郑连英	Zhèng lián yīng	chang5 lien2 in1	zeng6 lin4 jing1	Tēⁿ liân eng	Also Lin Ying.
鄭歡艱	郑欢艰	Zhèng huān jiān	chang5 fon1 gien1	zeng6 fun1 gaan1	Tēⁿ hoan kan	Also Huan Kang.
鄭秀英	郑秀英	Zhèng xiù yīng	chang5 siu5 in1	zeng6 sau3 jing1	Tēⁿ siù eng	Also Chung Siew Yin, Chung Siew Yin, Mrs. Lam Kam Thong (née Chung Slew Yin Neoh)
鄭鳳英	郑凤英	Zhèng fèng yīng	chang5 fung5 in1	zeng6 fung6 jing1	Tēⁿ hōng eng	Also Hong Ying.
N/A	N/A	N/A	N/A	N/A	N/A	Daughter Cheang Ah Soo, daughter by Tan Ah Loy.

=== Relationships ===
==== Khoo Thean Teik ====
Chung and Khoo Thean Teik were connected both politically and commercially, the politics of the day being commercially motivated in any case. Apart from the monopolies for tobacco, liquor, opium and gambling revenue farming in Perak that these two jointly obtained from Hugh Low, British Resident at Perak in 1889, they were both heads of their respective secret societies with Khoo being the head of the Tua Pek Kong or Kien Tek Society, which were allied against their common foe, the Ghee Hin. Chung and Khoo together represented the allied Haisan-Khianteik group of Perak Hakkas and Penang Hockiens.

Both Chung and Khoo were in the business of procuring, supplying or employing coolies. Khoo aided by Koh Seang Thye on one occasion supplied $60,000 in goods, money and ammunition to Chung and Tan Yit Hoon for their mining activities and for their military activities against the Ghee Hin in return for seven-tenths of the percentage of the tin they produced.

==== Foo Choo Choon ====
Foo Choo Choon originally worked for Chung Keng Kwee in his Lahat mining concession. He went on to marry a niece of Chung.

==== Hugh Low ====
The relationship between Chung and Hugh Low, the British Resident at Perak, started when Low arrived at Perak. At that time Chung was getting frustrated with the management of the revenue farm that had been given over to him and it was Low who, as he recalls in his journal "laughed him out of the nonsense about giving up the farm".

The two of them had many long and frank discussions about the mining business in general as well as revenue farming and the system of "advancers". On 15 May 1877, in a casual meeting between the two, Chung advocated the granting of land leases for the mines for periods of 21 years arguing that this would make it easier for miners to raise money. On 11 September the same year, Low made this so.

For Low, Chung represented a stabilising factor in mining communities that had yet to settle down following the Larut Wars. His was the voice of reason, admonishing the towkays who had stirred up a riot in 1879 and it was a voice that Low trusted and backed up.

==== Accusation ====
The September 1891 issue of Harpers's New Monthly Magazine (Volume 83, Issue 489) carried an article on Chinese Secret Societies and credited Chung with wealth amounting to two million Sterling. The article also stated that Chung was tried for murder an accusation that was refuted following the publication of a letter to the editor from Low, British Resident at Perak, in the December issue (Volume 84, Issue 499) of the same magazine. In his letter, Low refers to Chung as "my friend Captain Chang Ah Kwi, of Perak" and "my old friend" and urges the editor to take steps to correct the inaccuracies published earlier which he says do great injustice to his friend.

Low acknowledged that Chung was leader of the "Go Kwan faction" in the disturbances that preceded the British intervention under Clarke, in 1874. He also acknowledged that long after that time when Chung visited China, he was accused of piracy by his rivals in the tin mining business and while he was initially arrested and brought before the mandarins in Canton he was triumphantly acquitted of the charge.

Low went on to state categorically that "Captain Ah Kwi" who was at that time a long-standing member of the State Council, had never ever been "arrested on criminal charges where British influence prevailed", and had in fact from the very beginning "been a strenuous supporter of the settlement of the State of Perak".

The insertion ended with an apology from the author, Frederick Boyle, to the editor of Harper's Magazine.

=== Legal cases ===
1. Chang Ah Quee & Others vs Huttenbach, Liebest & Co.
2. Cheang Thye Phin & Others v Tan Ah Loy, Privy Council (1920) & (1921)
3. Cheang Thye Phin v Lim Ah Chen/Lim Ah Cheng and others; p. 317
4. Cheang Thye Phin v Lam Kin Sang
5. Koh Seang Thye v Chung Ah Quee [1886] 4 Ky 136 – 3 [3155]
6. Cheang Thye Gan v Lim Ah Chen & Others [0. J. No. 189 OF 1918], Cheang Thye Gan v Lim Ah Chen, (1921) 16 H.K.L.R. 19, H.K.L.R. 1957
7. "...that she was not received in the Penang family house owing to the jealousy of Tan Gek Im who refused her. No definite finding here appears necessary, but this point should be borne in mind in view of subsequent developments. Plaintiff was provided with a separate house by Cheang Ah Kwee in which she lived until 1901. In 1893 she bore Cheang Ah Kwee a son, Cheang Thye Gan who died a few ....", "Special provision was made for Cheang Thye Gan by Cheang Ah Kwee in his Will. ..."

=== Reported net worth ===
Chung made his fortune early in his life in the tin mines and revenue farms of Perak, and while lost it all during the Larut Wars, he rebuilt his empire and died a rich man. At the time of his death:

- he had held the Perak Revenue Farms for twelve years
- he owned ten mines employing an aggregate of 1,000 coolies
- his property in Hong Kong was estimated at $10,000,000
- his property in Beach Street, Penang was valued at $1,500,000

According to the Ipoh Echo, Chung was the richest man in the Federated Malay States and, when he died, the whole of his estate in Penang alone was worth seven million Straits dollars. The Singapore Free Press and Mercantile Advertiser wrote, "The property of the late Cheang Keng Kwi is valued at ten millions," and reported that he was the largest tin miner in the Peninsula and owned a tenth part of Georgetown Penang in addition to property in Perak and Hong Kong at the time of his death.

== Death ==
Chung died at the age of 74 on 13 December 1901 after a brief illness of only a few days.

=== Funerary ===
Chung left behind a wife, ten sons and five daughters, 20 grandchildren, and four great-grandchildren.

Chung was buried in the Chung Family Burial Plot in Mount Erskine purchased beforehand by himself and his daughter Chung, Kang Neoh.

His tomb is dated 1898. It was named "Region of Long Life", and Franke (Chinese Epigraphy. ..) believed that it was built before the great man died and was probably set up on the occasion of the demise of the wife who pre-deceased him. In his book published in 1985 Franke declared it was "the largest Chinese tomb in the whole of Malaysia. ..appropriate only to members of the imperial family or to the highest officials" and incorporating four-man-sized statues (the only tomb in Malaysia with statues of this kind) "called weng-chung. .. ...permitted only for the tombs of officials of the first rank."

His headstone bears the inscription:

"Kapitan of Perak, Chung Keng Quee from Tseng-ch'eng, appointed by Imperial patent of the Ch'ing Emperor as Tzu-cheng ta-fu, rewarded with the Peacock Feather, and Expectant Intendant of a Circuit of the fourth rank, and of his wife Lady Cheng, nee Ch'en, with the personal name Yii-yin and the posthumous name Chao-i appointed by Imperial patent as Third Rank Shu-jen, set up by nine sons, six daughters, twelve grandsons, and six granddaughters of the deceased."

Although he died in December 1901, he was only laid in his final resting place in 1904. On 11 May 1902, almost five months after his death, his remains were removed from Hye Kee Chan and placed in a temporary vault awaiting his final interment. The funeral procession from home to the family graveyard made up of people on foot and on rickshaws was reported to have been over a mile long and included several hundred Europeans catered to by Messrs Sarkies Brothers. Security was personally supervised by the CPO of Penang. The Straits Times reported that his funeral procession took an hour and a half to pass a fixed point.

== Honours ==
For his many acts of greatness the Manchu Qing dynasty Imperial government in 1894 conferred on him the title of "Mandarin, Second Rank" retrospectively for three generations. This meant that Chung, his father, Chung Hsing Fah, and his grandfather, Chung,Tung Lin, the last two posthumously, simultaneously became Mandarins of the Second Rank. In line with his elevation, he then adopted the fancy name of 慎之 (Sheng Chih).

== Legacy ==
One of his mining pools was donated for public use and is today the Taiping Lake Gardens. The work began in the early eighteen eighties. By 1893, a large area comprising swamps and abandoned mining pools was drained, levelled, planted and fenced for a public garden in Taiping. In 1911, it was considered to be perhaps the most beautiful of any gardens in the then Federated Malay States.

Two streets in Penang were named after him, Lebuh Keng Kwee (Keng Kwee Street) and Lebuh Ah Quee (Ah Quee Street).

Self-taught historian Lee Eng Kew named his book, about Taiping and its historical figures, 移國 - 太平華裔歷史人物集 The Chinese Historical Figures Of Taiping, using the inscriptions found on the four warrior statues at the grave of Chung. His book also featured Chung.
