= Pinang Peranakan Mansion =

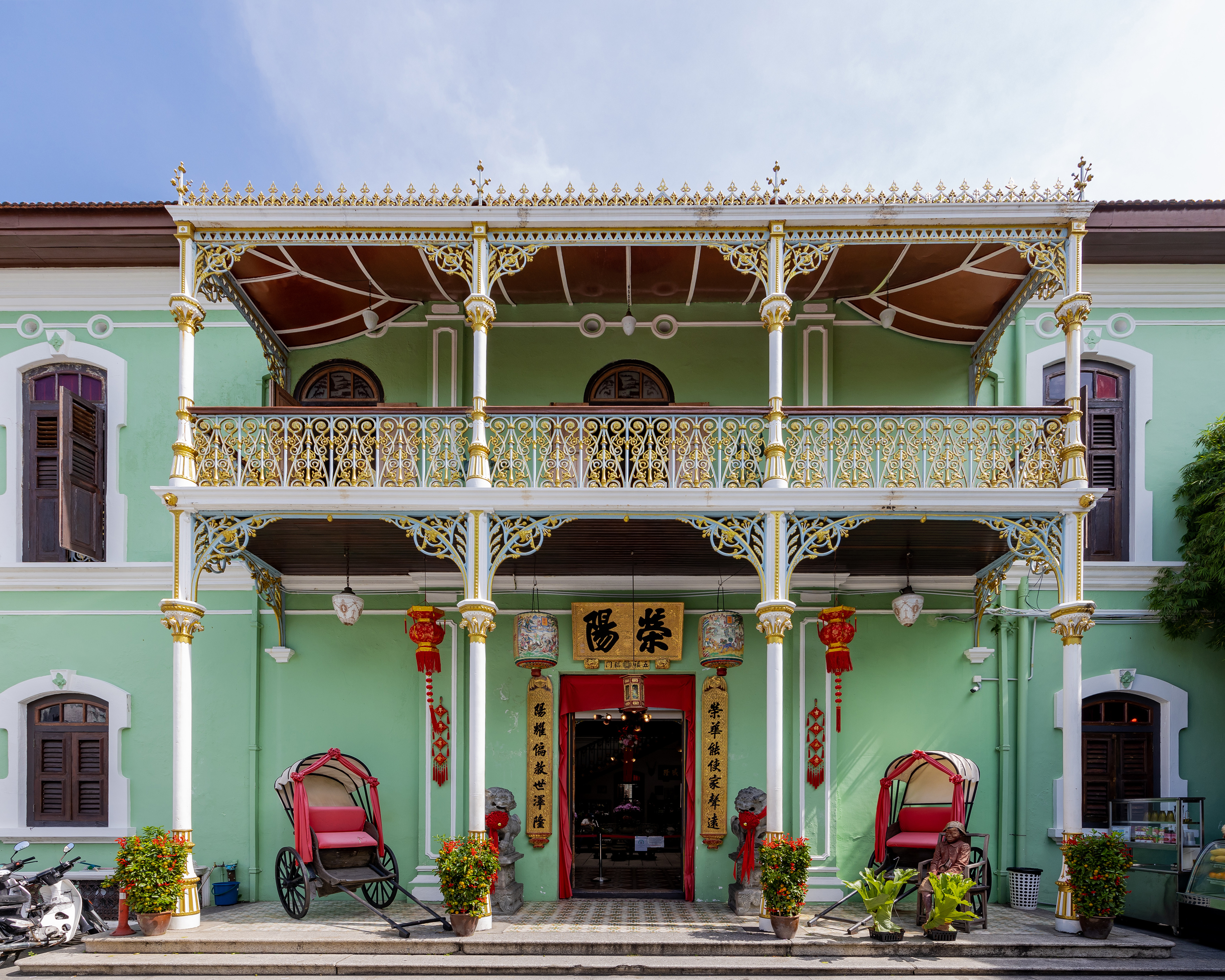
- Front facade of the Pinang Peranakan Mansion

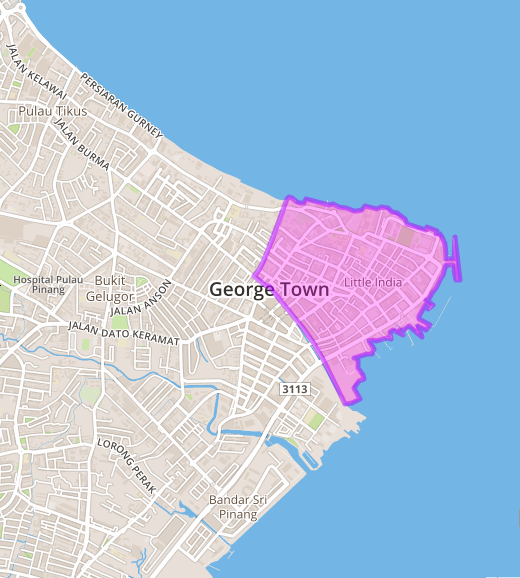
- Location within central George Town, Penang
- Former names: Hai Kee Chàn (Hokkien)

General information
- Type: Historic house museum
- Architectural style: Straits Chinese Eclectic
- Location: 29 Church Street, 10200 George Town, Penang, Malaysia, George Town, Penang, Malaysia
- Coordinates: 5.417999°N 100.341192°E
- Current tenants: Pinang Peranakan Mansion Sdn. Bhd.
- Groundbreaking: 1893; 133 years ago

Technical details
- Floor count: 2

UNESCO World Heritage Site
- Type: Cultural
- Criteria: ii, iii, iv
- Designated: 2008 (32nd session)
- Part of: George Town UNESCO Core Zone
- Reference no.: 1223
- Region: Asia-Pacific

The Pinang Peranakan Mansion (Malay: Rumah Agam Peranakan Pulau Pinang) in George Town, Penang, Malaysia, is a museum dedicated to Penang's Peranakan heritage. The museum itself is housed within a distinctive green-hued mansion at Church Street, George Town, which once served as the residence and office of a 19th-century Chinese tycoon, Chung Keng Quee.

The mansion contains thousands of Peranakan artifacts, antiques and collectibles, as well as showcasing Peranakan interior design and customs, such as the typical grand long dining table (Malay: tok panjang). Due to its unique architecture and interior design that reflect the lifestyles of the Peranakans in Penang, the mansion has been featured in television series and reality TV shows, such as The Little Nyonya, The Amazing Race and The Amazing Race Asia.

== History ==
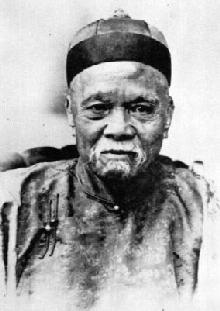
Chung Keng Quee founded the town of Taiping in Perak.

The mansion itself was formerly named Hai Kee Chan (海记栈), which means the 'Sea Remembrance Hall' in Penang Hokkien, by Chung, who was the Kapitan Cina of Perak and one of the richest men in Penang in the late 19th century. He commissioned the construction of the mansion in the 1890s, having bought the piece of land in 1893. The site was formerly used by the Ghee Hin, a Chinese secret society that was a rival of Chung's Hai San. Both societies had clashed in the 1867 Penang Riots, which ultimately led to the decline of the Ghee Hin.

The Straits Eclectic-style mansion, originally painted white, incorporated both European and Chinese designs. A five foot way was indented along the building's side facade, while the interior contains a number of wide courtyards similar to the Chinese townhouses of the era. Chung also acquired European interior furnishings for his new mansion, such as Scottish cast iron works and Stoke-on-Trent ceramic floor tiles. These European features were incorporated with Chinese elements, such as the carved wooden panels and screen for the walls.

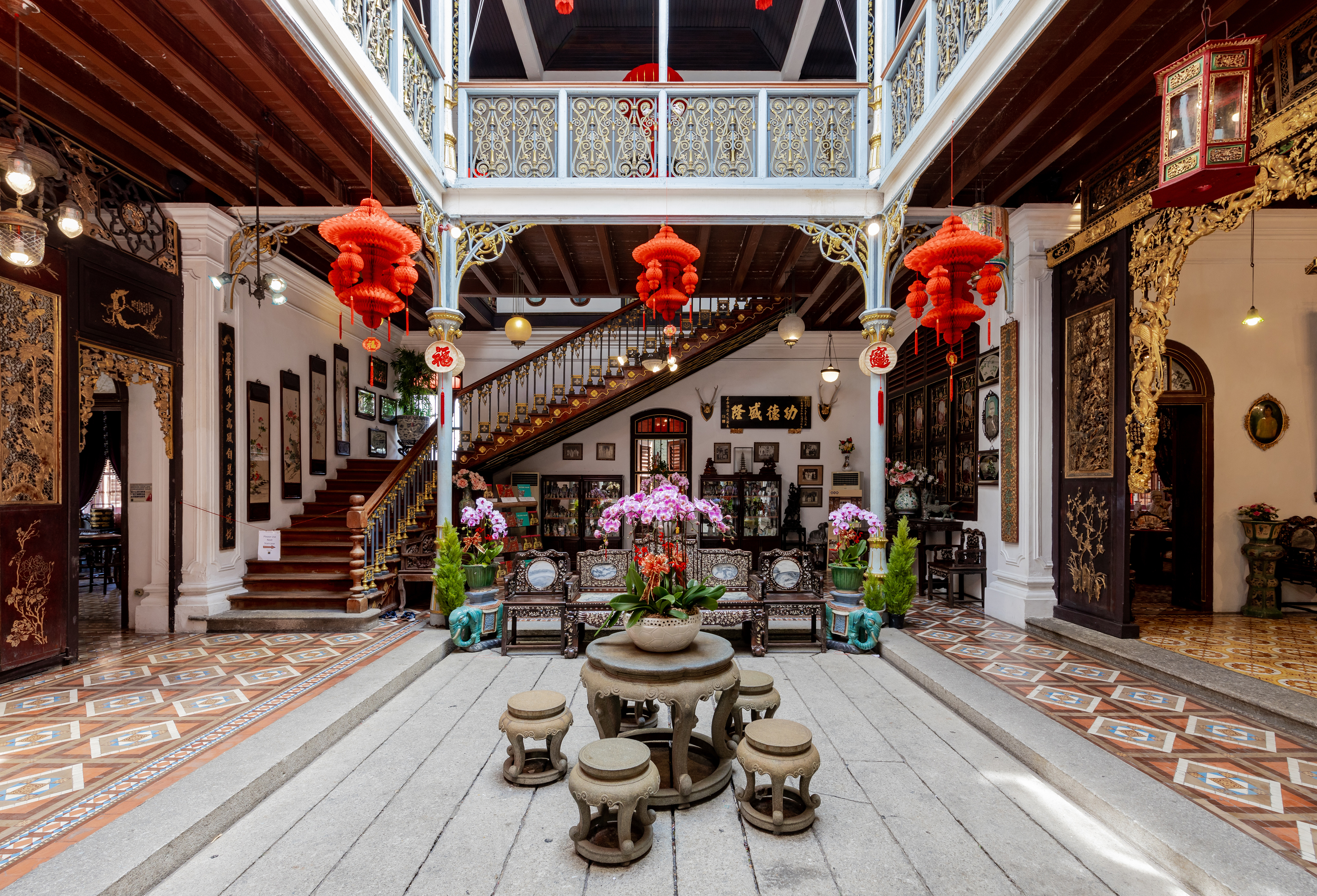
Inner courtyard

In addition, a temple honouring Chung himself was built next to the mansion. A life-sized statue of Chung still stands inside the temple, which is also adorned with portraits of Chung and his family members.

Chung died in 1901 and the mansion was passed down to his descendants. However, the mansion gradually became derelict. It was acquired by a property developer in the 1990s, who repainted it green and, with over 1,000 Peranakan antiques, turned it into a museum dedicated to Penang's Peranakan culture.

== Media appearances ==
- The Little Nyonya (Singapore, 2008)
- The Amazing Race 16
- The Amazing Race Asia 4
- The Iron Lady (TV series) (Malaysia, 2009)
- The Journey: A Voyage
- Crazy Rich Asians (film)
- The Amazing Race Australia 7

== See also ==
- Cheong Fatt Tze Mansion
