= Pangkor Treaty of 1874 =

1874 treaty between Great Britain and Perak

The Pangkor Treaty of 1874 was a treaty signed between Great Britain and the Sultan of Perak on 20 January 1874, on the Colonial Steamer Pluto, off the coast of Perak. The treaty is significant in the history of the Malay states as it legitimised British control of the Malay rulers and paved the way for British imperialism in Malaya. It was the result of a multi-day conference organised by Andrew Clarke, the Governor of the Straits Settlements, to solve two problems: the Larut War and the disputed succession of the sultanship of Perak.

== Background ==
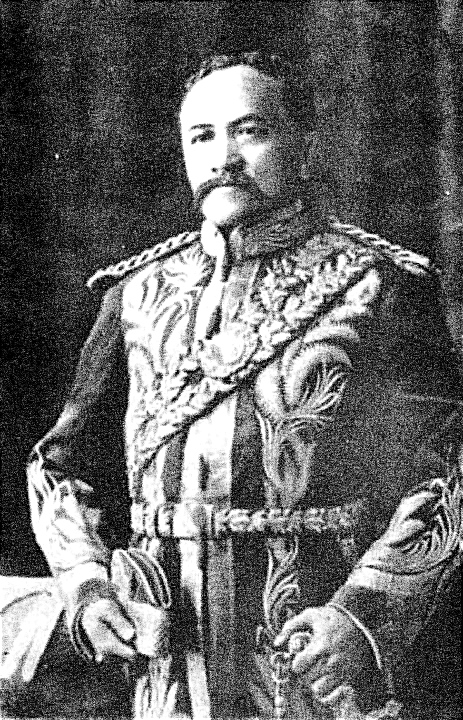
Sultan Abdullah of Perak

Perak was a major tin producer throughout the 19th century, leading Britain, which had already colonised Penang, Malacca and Singapore, to consider Perak of significant importance. However, local strife, collectively known as the Larut Wars (1861–1874), between the local Malay elites and frequent clashes between Chinese secret societies disrupted the supply of tin from the mines of Perak.

In 1871, Sultan Ali of Perak died. However, Raja Abdullah, the heir apparent, had not been present at his funeral. Raja Bendahara Sultan Ismail was proclaimed Sultan of Perak instead. At the same time, two Chinese secret societies, Ghee Hin (led by Chin Ah Yam) and Hai San (led by Chung Keng Quee), fought against each other over control of the tin mines during the Larut Wars.

The need to restore law and order in Perak gave cause for a new British policy concerning intervention in the affairs of the Malay States. In actuality there were two distinctive agreements made. The primary agreement was intended to ensure an end to the fighting between Ghee Hin and Hai San and pave the way for peaceful coexistence in future. The second, to settle the issue of succession in Perak.

Tate in The Making of Modern South-East Asia says of these that "the first one, which had been ready for over a week prior to the signing, concerned Larut and provided for a settlement between the Hai San and Ghee Ghin which both sides respected and carried out satisfactorily. The second (more recently drafted) agreement concerned the succession dispute around the Perak throne and was unsatisfactory from the very beginning."

Abdullah later appealed to the British regarding these two problems. He turned to Tan Kim Cheng, a Chinese businessman in Singapore who was also a member of the Ghee Hin secret society and a supporter of the Raja Muda Abdullah of Perak and the Ghee Hin in Larut. Tan, together with William Henry Macleod Read, an English merchant in Singapore, drafted a letter to Governor Andrew Clarke which Abdullah signed. The letter expressed Abdullah's desire to place Perak under British protection, and "to have a man of sufficient abilities to show (him) a good system of government." Chung had already presented a petition on 26 September 1872, signed by himself and 44 other Chinese leaders, seeking British interference following the attack of 12,000 men of Chung Shan by 2,000 men of Sen Ning. The British immediately saw this as an opportunity to expand its influence in Southeast Asia and to strengthen its monopoly on tin exports. As a result, the Pangkor Treaty of 1874 was signed.

== Pangkor Treaty ==
The Chinese chiefs arrived on 13 January, the Hai San group was accompanied by Swettenham, while the Ghee Hins group was escorted by Pickering. Mantri Ngah Ibrahim arrived the next day, escorted by his lawyer R. C. Woods and his security chief Tristram Speedy. Abdullah and the Malay chiefs arrived on 15 January.

The afternoon session (circa 3:30 p.m.) on 16 January was a one-to-one meeting between Mantri Ngah Ibrahim and Clarke, in which Clarke highlighted to the Mantri that the problem in Larut was a direct consequence of his vacillating policy.

The second day of the conference (17 January) was the meeting between Clarke and the Malay chiefs, whose opinions were individually considered before the candidate for the sultanship was decided. 18 January was a Saturday and no business was conducted.

On 19 January, the draft treaty was discussed with the Malay chiefs. The Treaty of Pangkor was officially sealed in the afternoon session of the concluding day. In the morning session of 20 January, another agreement between Clarke and the Chinese chiefs was signed, i.e. Bond of $50,000 to keep the peace.

On 20 January, the Straits Settlements governor Sir Andrew Clarke convened a meeting aboard the Colonial Steamer Pluto anchored off Pangkor island. Documents were signed aboard the ship at Pangkor Island to settle the Chinese dispute, clear the sultan succession dispute and pave the way for the acceptance of British residency - Tristram Speedy was appointed to administer Larut as assistant to the British resident, whose advice must be asked and acted upon on all questions other than those touching on Malay religion and customs. Abdullah was recognised as sultan by the British and was to be installed on the throne of Perak in preference to his rival, Sultan Ismail.

The Malay translation of the treaty was prepared by Frank Swettenham and Mohamed Said, the munshi for the Straits Settlements.

Another agreement was signed with the Chinese, Chung and Chin Ah Yam, leaders of the Hai San and Ghee Hin, respectively, were ennobled by the British with the title of Kapitan Cina (leader of the Chinese community) and the town of Larut was renamed Taiping ("太平" in Chinese, meaning "everlasting peace") as a confirmation of the new state of truce. A bond of $50,000 to keep the peace was also signed.

Tate in The Making of Modern South-East Asia says of these that "the first one, which had been ready for over a week prior to the signing, concerned Larut and provided for a settlement between the Hai San and Ghee Ghin which both sides respected and carried out satisfactorily. The second (more recently drafted) agreement concerned the succession dispute around the Perak throne and was unsatisfactory from the very beginning."

=== Dispute ===
There were three possibilities for the Perak throne and of these only one was present at the meeting - Abdullah. Sultan Ismail who was the crowned ruler, had refused to attend. The British did not appear to know of the existence of the third possible claimant, Raja Yusof, who was naturally not invited.

The chiefs of Perak (who were not present) were concerned with the treaty, the agreement made between the British and Abdullah and the British's recognition of Abdullah as sultan), as the issue of succession was settled three years earlier with the election of Sultan Ismail. To these chiefs, the British may have proclaimed Abdullah sultan but his accession was not valid in their eyes and he did not hold the royal regalia. The royal regalia was held by Sultan Ismail which all attempts at recovering these from him having failed.

== Participants ==
The three parties involved in the engagement were the British, the Malay rulers, and the Chinese.

British Officials Present were:

- Major-General Sir Andrew Clarke, the Governor, Commander-in-Chief, and Vice-Admiral of the Straits Settlements
- Bradell, the Attorney-General
- Major J.F.A. McNair, the Colonial Engineer
- Colonel Samuel Dunlop, the Inspector-General of Police
- A.M. Skinner of the Secretariat
- William A. Pickering, officer in charge of Chinese affairs
- Frank A. Swettenham, interpreter of Malay from the Land Revenue Office

The Malay rulers present were

- Raja Abdullah
- Raja Idris
- Raja Bendahara
- the Mantri Ngah Ibrahim
- the Temenggong
- the Shahbandar
- the Raja Mahkota
- the Laxamana
- the Dato Sagor

Twenty-six Chinese were present, led by their respective headmen, Chin Ah Yam of the Ghee Hin and Chung Keng Quee of the Hai San as well as Chinese interpreter, (Marcus Chong or Wong Ah Chong).

== Agreement ==
=== Terms and conditions ===
The agreement dictated:

- That the Raja Muda Abdullah be recognised as the Sultan of Perak.
- That the Raja Bandahara Ismail, now acting sultan, be allowed to retain the title of Sultan Muda with a pension and a certain small territory assigned to him.
- That all the other nominations of great Officers made at the time the Rajah Bandahara Ismail received the regalia be confirmed.
- That the power given to the Orang Kayah Mantri over Larut by the late Sultan be confirmed.
- That all revenues be collected and all appointments made in the name of the Sultan.
- That the Sultan receive and provide a suitable residence for a British Officer to be called Resident, who shall be accredited to his Court, and whose advice must be asked and acted upon on all questions other than those touching Malay religion and custom.
- That the Governor of Larut shall have attached to him as Assistant Resident, a British Officer acting under the Resident of Perak, with similar power and subordinate only to the said Resident.
- That the cost of these Residents with their establishments be determined by the Government of the Straits Settlements and be a first charge on the Revenues of Perak.
- That a Civil List regulating the income to be received by the Sultan, by the Bandahara, by the Mantri, and by the other Officers be the next charge on the said Revenue.
- That the collection and control of all revenue and the general administration of the country be regulated under the advice of these Residents.
- That the Treaty under which the Pulo Dinding and the islands of Pangkor were ceded to Great Britain having been misunderstood and it being desirable to readjust the same, so as to carry into effect the intention of the Framers thereof, it is hereby declared that the Boundaries of the said Territory so ceded shall be rectified as follows, that is to say: from Bukit Sigari, as laid down in the Chart Sheet No. 1 Straits of Malacca, a tracing of which is annexed, marked A, in a straight line to the sea, thence along the sea coast to the South, to Pulo Katta on the West, and from Pulo Katta a line running North East about five miles, and thence North to Bukit Sigari.
- That the Southern watershed of the Krean River, that is to say, the portion of land draining into that river from the south be declared British Territory, as a rectification of the Southern Boundary of Province Wellesley. Such Boundary to be marked out by commissioners; one named by the Government of the Straits Settlements, and the other by the Sultan of Perak.
- That on the cessation of the present disturbances in Perak and the re-establishment of peace and amity among the contending factions in that country, immediate measures under the control and supervision of one or more British Officers shall be taken for restoring as far as practicable the occupation of the mines, and the possession of machinery, &c., as held previous to the commencement of these disturbances, and for the payment of compensation for damages, the decision of such officers shall be final in such case.
- The Mantri of Larut engages to acknowledge as a debt due by him to the Government of the Straits Settlements, the charges and expenses incurred by this investigation, as well as charges and expenses to which the Colony of the Straits Settlements and Great Britain have been put or may be put by their efforts to secure the tranquility of Perak and the safety of trade.

== Result ==
Raja Ismail did not attend the meeting arranged between Clarke and Abdullah. He did not recognise the agreement but had no choice as he was faced with the alliance between Abdullah and the British. As a result, Abdullah was made sultan, and Sir James W. W. Birch was appointed as Perak's first British resident after the treaty came into force.

Following this, the British actively became involved in three other Malay states: Negeri Sembilan, Selangor and Pahang. These states, along with Perak, were later reorganised into the Federated Malay States.

Clarke arrived in November 1873 and he put Perak, Selangor and Sungei Ujong under British protection within a year, and Pahang in 1888. In 1875, a British resident was sent to Selangor. In 1874, a British resident was sent to Sungei Ujong.

== See also ==
- British Malaya topics
