= Samuel Dunlop =

British civil servant and officer (1838-1917)

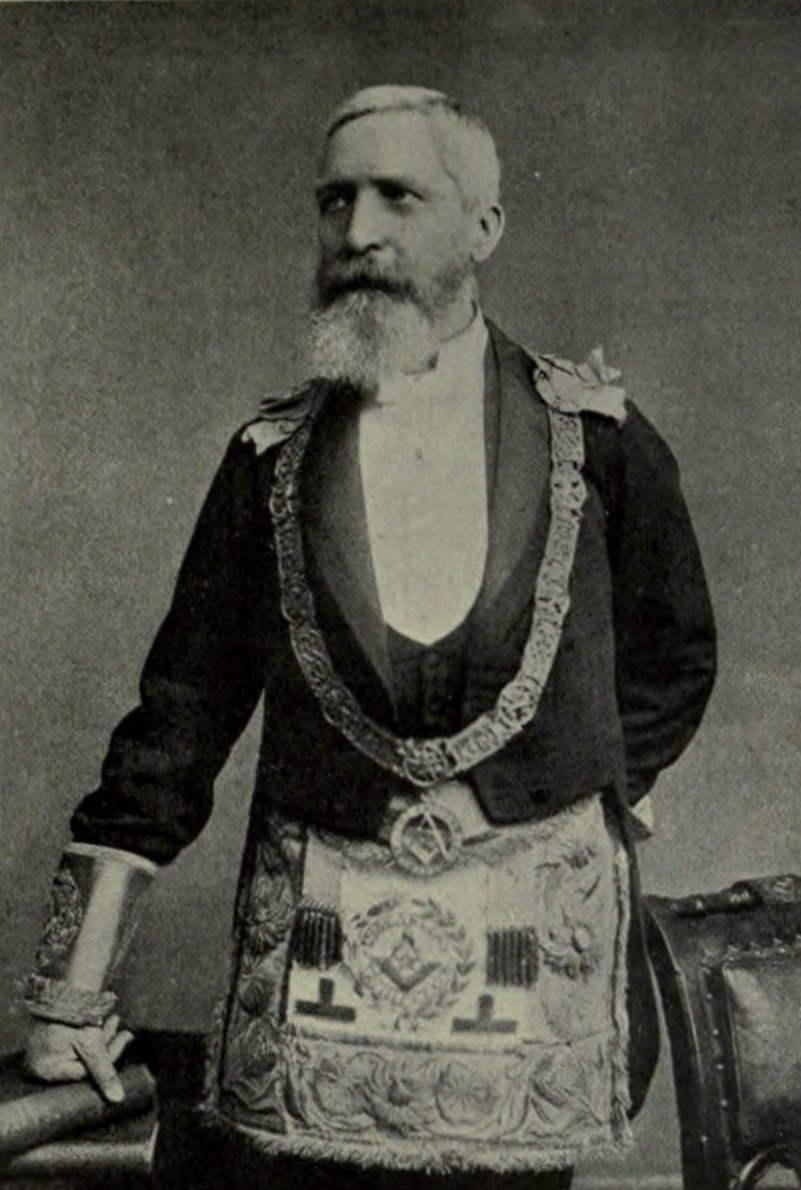

2nd Inspector General of the Straits Settlements Police
- In office 1875–1891
- Preceded by: Charles Bushe Plunket
- Succeeded by: Robert Walter Maxwell

Personal details
- Born: 8 March 1838 Derriaghy, County Antrim
- Died: 28 June 1917 (aged 79) Highgate, London

Col. Samuel Dunlop, CMG (8 March 1838 – 28 June 1917) was a British civil servant and officer in the Royal Artillery. He served in several capacities as a member of the Straits Settlements civil service but is perhaps best known as the Inspector-General of Police (IGP) for the Straits Settlements Police Force, headquartered in British Singapore, and responsible for the police forces of Singapore, British Penang, and British Malacca.

Dunlop was born in Derriaghy, County Antrim, the son of Samuel Dunlop.

== Career ==
In 1874, Dunlop took part in the negotiations which led to the signing of the Pangkor Treaty between the British government and the Sultan of Perak, which established a British Protectorate in Malaya.

Three days after signing of the Pangkor Treaty, Dunlop was appointed a member of Commission for the Pacification of Larut also comprising Chung Keng Quee, John Frederick Adolphus McNair, Frank Swettenham, William A. Pickering and Chin Seng Yam, whose terms of reference, among others, was to arrange for an amicable settlement relating to the Larut tin mines. The Commissioners after due investigation and deliberation decided to hand the mines in Klian Pauh (Taiping) over to the Hai San and the mines in Klian Bharu (Kamunting) to the Ghee Hin.

Captain, Major, and then Colonel, Samuel Dunlop served in Singapore as the Inspector General of the Straits Settlements Police in 1875 succeeding C B Plunket and held that position till 1890, handing over the reins to RW Maxwell.

When the Municipal Commission of Singapore was created from Municipal Council in 1887, Dunlop became the President of the Commission.

In 1899 together with Robert Little, John Hutchinson Robertson, John Anderson, Robert Jamie, Alexander Maughan Martin, Thomas Cuthbertson, William McKerrow and William A. Pickering, Dunlop became a trustee of the Presbyterian Church in Singapore.

== Freemason ==
Dunlop was the Worshipful Master of The Lodge of St George from 1879 to 1880.

On 28 December 1885, Dunlop was installed as District Grand Master of the Freemasons in Singapore succeeding William Henry Macleod Read. He held the position till 1891.

== Personal life ==
Dunlop was the father of Sir Thomas Dacre Dunlop. He died in Highgate, London, aged 79, on 28 June 1917.

== Legacy ==
Dunlop Street in Singapore's Little India area (originally known as Rangasamy Road), is believed to have been named after Samuel Dunlop.
