= Raja Ismail =

Raja Ismail may refer to:

- Sultan Ismail of Perak, replaced by Sultan Abdullah of Perak by virtue of the Pangkor Treaty of 1874
- Raja Ismail bin Raja Abdullah, son of Raja Abdullah bin Raja Jaafar; participant of the Klang War
