= Larut Wars =

Series of wars from 1861–1874

Date	1861–1862, 1865, 1872, 1873
Location	Perak

Belligerents
Ghee Hin	Hai San Secret Society

The Larut Wars were a series of four wars that began in July 1861 and ended with the signing of the Pangkor Treaty of 1874. The conflicts were fought among local Chinese secret societies over the control of mining areas in Perak which later involved a rivalry between Raja Abdullah and Ngah Ibrahim, making it a war of succession.

== First war (1861–1862) ==
The First Larut War began in July 1861 when arguments over control of watercourse to their mines escalated and led members of the Hai San Secret Society to drive the members of the Ghee Hin society out of Klian Baharu (now Kamunting). The Governor of the Straits Settlements, Orfeur Cavenagh intervened and the Menteri of Larut, Ngah Ibrahim, was made to compensate the Ghee Hin with $17,447 on behalf of the Sultan of Perak.

== Second war (1865) ==
The Second Larut War took place in 1865 and was sparked by a gambling quarrel in June between members of the two opposing secret societies. The Hai San members took 14 Ghee Hin as prisoners, 13 of whom were killed. The 14th escaped to inform his clan causing the Ghee Hin to retaliate by attacking a Hai San village, razing it to the ground and killing 40 men in the process. The battle continued back and forth and spread to Province Wellesley and the island of Penang while other secret societies started to join the fray. Both sides were later exhausted and came to terms. An official inquiry took place and both the Hai San and Ghee Hin societies were fined $5,000 each for violating the peace of Penang and their leaders exiled.

So Ah Chiang, leader of the Ghee Hin was captured by Ngah Ibrahim at Teluk Kertang (Kuala Sepetang) and executed.

By around 1870, there were a combined total of about 40,000 Hakka and Cantonese mine workers in the Larut district and the mining areas between the two groups were near to each other. It is this proximity that might explain how the next battle began.

== Third war (1872) ==
In February 1872 Cheng Sheng miners had a dispute with Sin Neng miners over the boundaries of some mining lands. Lee Ah Kun (Lee Ko Yin) represented the Sin Neng and attempted to negotiate but was murdered on 16 February on the pretext of an adulterous affair.

It has been believed that The Third Larut War erupted in 1872 over a scandal involving the Lee Ah Kun (李亞勤 / 李亚勤), the attorney at Larut (for the Ghee Hin leader Ho Ghi Sui) and the wife of a nephew of the Hai San leader, Chung Keng Quee. It is said that upon discovery, the allegedly adulterous couple was caught, tortured, put into a pig basket (simplified Chinese: 猪笼; traditional Chinese: 豬籠) and thrown into a disused mining pond where they drowned.

Supposedly to avenge the death of their leader, the Ghee Hin had 4,000 professional fighting men (brought in from China via Penang) attack the Hai San. For the first time, the Hai San were driven out of Larut. About 10,000 Hai San men sought sanctuary in Penang. Months later, the Hai San, supported by Ngah Ibrahim, recovered their Matang and Larut mines.

Others hold that the alleged "intrigue" never happened and was merely a political fiction to justify the murder of Ah Kun (aka Lee Coyn) in a manner that would permit Tokong to save face for the death sentence passed down on their leader Khoo Thean Tek for his part in the Penang Riots of 1869 where Ah Kun apparently got off without punishment.

At this time, Raja Abdullah, a claimant to the royal throne of Perak and an enemy of Ngah Ibrahim, took sides against the Hai San and Ngah Ibrahim.

On 26 September 1872, Chung signed a petition together with 44 other Chinese leaders, seeking British interference following the attack of 12,000 men of Chung Shan by 2,000 men of Sen Ning.

== Fourth war (1873) ==
The Fourth Larut War occurred in 1873. Weeks after the Hai Sans regained Larut, the Ghee Hin, supported by Raja Abdullah, counter-attacked with arms and men from Singapore and China. Ngah Ibrahim's properties in Matang were destroyed. Local Malay residents were also killed and their property, destroyed. The attack spread to Krian, Pangkor and Dinding.

The Malay chiefs who had taken sides in the Larut Wars were now alarmed at the disorder created by the Chinese miners and secret societies. The Straits Settlement Penang Chinese, seeing their investments destroyed in the Larut Wars, sought intervention form British. Over 40,000 Chinese from the Go-Kuan and Si-Kuan were engaged in the war.

In August 1873, Edward Anson, the last lieutenant-governor of Penang, sought to bring about a ceasefire between the two parties and convened a meeting at the beginning of the month attended, apart from Anson, by Chung (Hai San), Ho Ghi Sui (Ghee Hin), Foo Tye Sin (pro-Hai San), Ngah Ibrahim (pro-Hai San), Abdullah (pro-Ghee Hin), Tengku Kudin (pro-Abdullah) and a British Naval Captain. The two sides agreed to keep the peace pending British arbitration with Ngah Ibrahim taking responsibility for the Hai San and Abdullah taking responsibility for the Ghee Hin. Abdullah failed to ensure that the Ghee Hin kept the peace prompting British to back Ngah Ibrahim and the Hai San.

On 3 September 1873 outgoing Straits Settlements governor Sir Harry Ord recognised Ngah Ibrahim, through a proclamation, as the independent (i.e. independent of Perak rule) ruler of Larut. On 5 September he temporarily lifted an arms embargo (imposed since February) just long enough for Hai San in Larut to receive munitions. In the middle of that month a British vessel got into an entanglement with some Ghee Hin junks which led to British bombardment and capture of Ghee hin stockades at Matang and Kuala Selinsing.

Ngah Ibrahim's Penang residence was blown up on 16 September 1873. A week later a similar attempt was made on Chung Keng Quee's house and Abdullah and his Ghee Hin cohorts were arrested at sea and brought back to Penang where they were eventually released but forbidden to return to Perak.

== Pangkor Treaty ==
The need to restore law and order in Perak gave cause for a new British policy concerning intervention in the affairs of the Malay States which resulted in the Pangkor Treaty. In 1874, the Straits Settlements governor Sir Andrew Clarke convened a meeting on Pulau Pangkor, at which Sultan Abdullah was installed on the throne of Perak in preference to his rival, Sultan Ismail.

Documents were signed on 20 January 1874 aboard The Pluto at Pangkor Island to settle the Chinese dispute, clear the succession dispute and pave the way for the acceptance of British Residency – Captain Speedy was appointed to administer Larut as assistant to the British Resident.

Chung and Chin Ah Yam, leaders of the Hai San and Ghee Hin, respectively, were ennobled by the British with the title of Chinese Kapitan and the town of Larut was renamed Taiping ("太平" in Chinese, meaning "everlasting peace") as a confirmation of the new state of truce. Three days later, Chung was appointed a member of the Pacification Commission headed by Captain S. Dunlop and Messrs. Frank Swettenham and William A. Pickering – one of the objectives of the commission was to arrange an amicable settlement of the squabbles over the tin mines at Larut.

The Commissioners decided to allocate the mines in Klian Pauh (Taiping) to the Hai San and the mines in Klian Bharu (Kamunting) to the Ghee Hin.

Scholar Irene Liao has connected this settlement with the establishment of the first temple in the Malay peninsula devoted to goddess He Xiangu in the 1880s in Taiping. Liao sees the establishment of the temple as an "effort to reconcile" after the wars, and "as part of a cultural strategy to symbolically integrate all Guangdong immigrants into one community". Many Chinese miners came from Zengcheng District, the main center of the cult of He Xiangu.

== Aftermath ==
The newly appointed British Resident Minister James W. W. Birch was assassinated in 1875 on the orders of Lela Pandak Lam (alias Dato Maharaja Lela). Lela was a prince and mufti from Upper Perak, who was either motivated to protect his economic interests by restoring slavery, which had been prohibited by the British or to restore Perakian independence, a view commonly held by modern Malaysian nationalists. In the resulting Perak War (1875–1876), the British defeated the rebels, executed Lela and expelled both Raja Abdullah and Ngah Ibrahim to the Seychelles on the accusation that they had been involved in the conspiracy to assassinate Birch. The British appointed Yusuf Sharifuddin Muzaffar Shah as regent of Perak in 1877 and appointed him as the new Sultan of Perak in 1886.

== See also ==
- Klang War
