= Tseng Lung Hui Kuan =

The Tseng Lung (Zeng Long) Hui-Kuan were Malaysian associations for people from Zengcheng (Chinese: 增城) and Longmen (Chinese: 龙门) counties of Guangzhou (Chinese: 广州) prefecture in South China.

- Tseng Lung Hui Kuan, Penang, founded in 1886 by Capitan China Chung Keng Quee
- Tseng Lung Hui Kuan, Market Road, Taiping, Perak, founded in 1885 by Capitan China Chung Keng Quee
- Tseng Lung Hui Kuan, Gopeng, Perak, founded in 1885 by Capitan China Chung Keng Quee
