= John Frederick Adolphus McNair =

British colonial officer (1828–1910)

John Frederick Adolphus McNair CMG RA AMICE FLS FRGS (23 October 1828 – 17 May 1910) was a British Indian and colonial official.

== Early life and family ==
McNair was born in Bath. He married firstly Sarah Desgranges Paine in 1849. They had seven children. He married secondly Madalena Williamson, née Vallance.

== Career ==
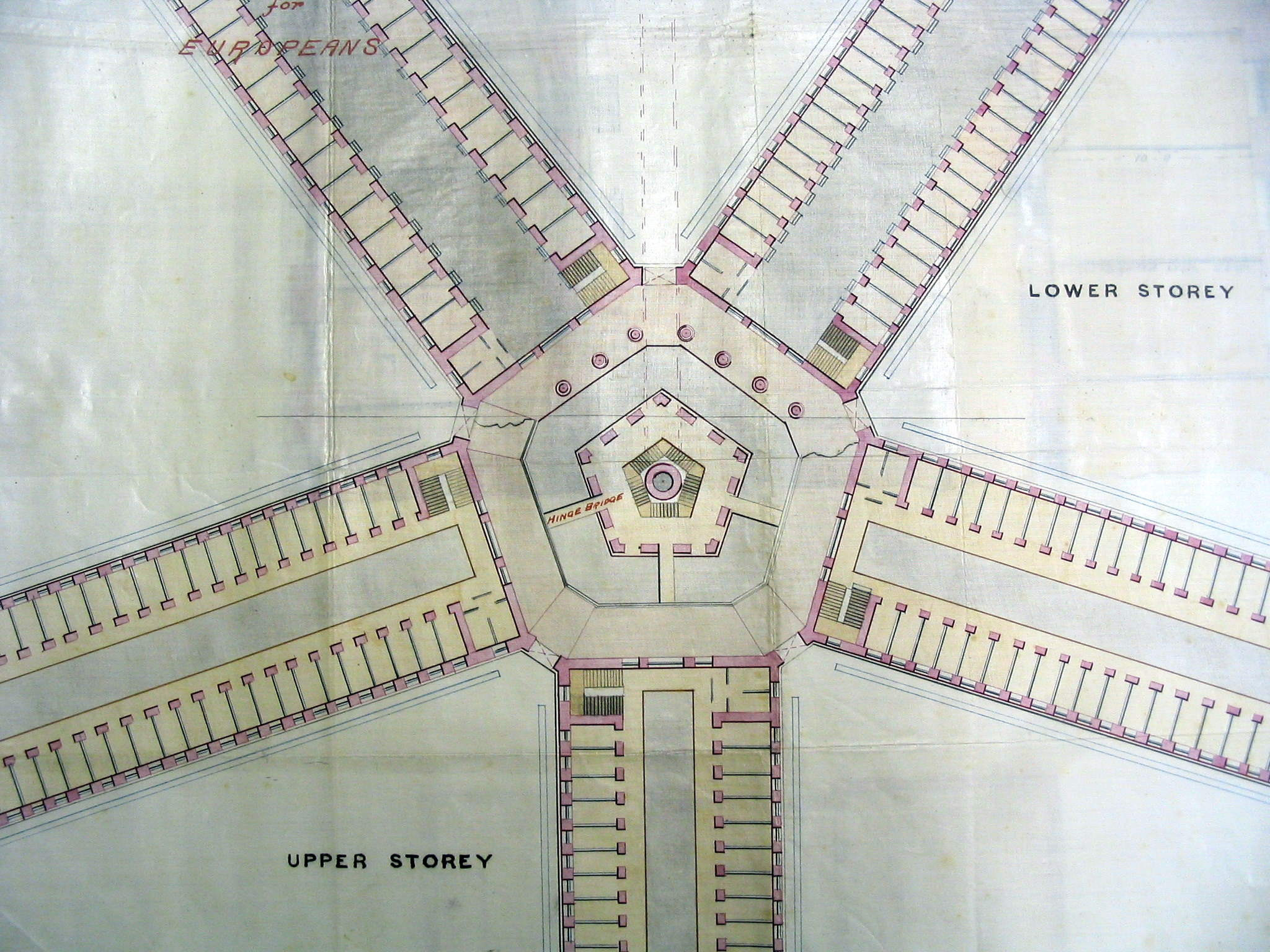
An 1880s architectural drawing by McNair depicting a proposed panopticon-style prison at Outram that was never built

McNair was educated at King's College London and at the School of Mines. He was a multi-talented civil servant in the service of the Straits Settlements. He was an engineer, superintendent of convicts, manager of public works and a member of the commission for the pacification of Larut following the signing of a peace treaty, in 1874.

McNair's childhood was filled with the study of geology. Over time he amassed a large collection of metals. He later had this transported to Madras where he was to begin his first job.

In 1846, at the age of 17, McNair left England to take up employment with the British East India Company, (E. I. C.) at Madras, India. McNair studied and was fluent in Hindustani, a skill that would stand him in good stead.

From Madras, McNair was transferred to Malacca (part of Straits Settlements in 1853 to be responsible for the Madras Native Artillery reporting to J. B. Westerhout, then the advisor to the government of the Straits Settlements.

He was then posted to Singapore, where he took up an appointment as private secretary and aide-de-camp to the Governor of Straits Settlements. In 1857, McNair was appointed Executive Engineer and Superintendent of Convicts in the Straits Settlements (Penang, Malacca and Singapore) and he was also in responsible for Public Works and the Oriental Gaol in Singapore.

== Contributions ==
His strong command of the Hindustani language meant he could easily converse with Indian convicts which was particularly useful since he had only one assistant, a European warden, the petty officers being selected among the convicts themselves.

McNair employed the Indian convicts in the construction of roads all over Singapore and buildings like the St Andrew's Cathedral, Singapore and Government House (known as The Istana).

In 1867, he accompanied Sir Harry Ord the new governor of Straits Settlements back to Singapore, when control of the Straits Settlements was transferred from the India Office to the Colonial Office in London. He was appointed Colonial Engineer and through his efforts, the building of the water works which had been plagued with failures, was successfully completed.

In 1874, though not a commissioner himself, he was involved with the Commission for the Pacification of Larut in Perak comprising then Captain Samuel Dunlop, F. A. Swettenham, Chung Keng Quee and Chin Seng Yam.

Sir Andrew Clarke started the title "Empress of India," and asked Major McNair to translate this. Of the several versions he provided, "Kaisar-i-Hind" was selected and officially used for the first time in Sir Andrew's proclamation, which was at once sent home to the Secretary of State for the Colonies, the Earl of Carnavon.

In 1875, Following the murder of J. W. W. Birch and the Perak War it started, he was appointed Chief Commissioner inquiring into the complicity of the Chiefs of Perak, 1875-1876.

In 1882, he was appointed Acting Resident Councillor to the Governor of Penang. McNair Street in George Town is named after him. He resigned his position in 1884 on medical grounds after a distinguished career in the Straits Settlements spanning many different positions (he had acted as Colonial Secretary in Singapore at one time) and locations (he was once in charge of artillery in Labuan).

His several missions to Siam (now Thailand) gained him familiarity with its King of Thailand and was conferred with the Order of the White Elephant by his majesty King of Siam. On 24 May 1879, he was appointed a Companion of the Order of St Michael and St George.

== See also ==
- Corresp: Actions of Perak Expeditionary Force post-murder of Birch

== Bibliography ==
- Perak and the Malays (1878) by Major Fred. McNair
- Prisoners their own warders (1899) by Major J.F.A.McNair
