= Cheah Tek Soon =

19th-century Penang businessman

Chinese name
- Traditional Chinese: 謝德順
- Hanyu Pinyin: Xiè Déshùn
- Jyutping: Ze6 Dak1 Seon6
- Hokkien POJ: Chiā Tek-sūn

Cheah Tek Soon (Chinese: 謝德順; pinyin: Xiè Déshùn; Jyutping: Ze6 Dak1 Seon6; Pe̍h-ōe-jī: Chiā Tek-sūn) was a 19th-century Penang businessman, and headman of the Hokkien in Penang, after whom Tek Soon Street was named. He was an active member of the Penang community and the bandstand that was erected near the Town Hall before the Japanese Occupation was his gift to the city.

Cheah Tek Soon never married but he had an adopted daughter, Cheah Liew Bee, who was the biological child of his brother, Cheah Tek Thye.

== The Penang Khean Guan Insurance Company ==
He was a founder and member of the board of directors of the Penang Khean Guan Insurance Company, the first Chinese insurance company in the Straits Settlement.

== Penang Opium Syndicate ==
He was a revenue farmer for a number of years and, together with his partners, held the Penang Opium Farm from 1880 to 1888 under Chop 'Ban Bee:'

- 1880–1882 Chop 'Ban Bee': Cheah Chen Eok, Lee Chin Chuan, Gan Kim Swee, Khoo Thean Poh, Cheah Tek Soon
- 1883–1885 Chop 'Ban Bee': Cheah Chen Eok, Lee Chin Chuan, Gan Kim Swee, Khoo Thean Poh, Cheah Tek Soon
- 1886–1888 Chop 'Ban Bee': Cheah Chen Eok, Lee Chin Chuan, Gan Kim Swee, Ng Ah Thye, Cheah Tek Soon

Together with Ng Pak Soon, also a member of the Penang Chinese Advisory Board, his higher $126,700 bid for the Penang Farms in 1900 lost out to incumbent Lim Kek Chuan & Co.'s $125,000. He was also a Singapore Opium Farm holder.

== Weld Quay (Penang) ==
He was a part of a large deputation that met with Governor Sir Frederick Weld on the question of building a quay at the back of Beach Street (Penang) on 27 August 1881. Together with him were the Honourable Captain McCallum (Royal Engineers), and Messrs. James Gibson ( partner at Sandilands, Buttery & Co.), the Hon. Daniel Logan (the Penang Chamber of Commerce's representative on the Straits Settlements Legislative Council), Karl, Gan Kim Swee, Khaw Boo Aun, Khoo Thean Teik, Khoo Kay Chan, Oh Yean Heng, Lim Leng Cheak, Tan Sim Ho, Beng Tek, Khoo Cheat, Eng Beng Seah, among others. Governor Weld said that the Government was, then, finally in a position to meet their wishes with the greatest liberality in undertaking this scheme that had been talked about for many years, but for one reason or another, nothing had resulted from it. The work, which finally began with land reclamation in 1883, resulted in the completion of Weld Quay in 1889, at a cost of $526,107.

== Kong Hock Keong Temple ==
Along with Foo Tye Sin, Khaw Boo Aun, Khoo Thean Teik, and Khaw Sim Bee, he was among the twenty leading citizens of Penang, appointed by the Straits Settlements Government to be trustees of the Kong Hock Keong Temple in Pitt Street for 1887, vested with the powers to appoint, or dismiss, priests. This came following complaints lodged with Government over the manner in which priests there conducted temple affairs. The new trustees appointed Beow Lean, of the Yung Chuan Monastery of Ku Shan, the drum mountain in Fuzhou, Fujian, China. Their confidence was justified. Beow Lean soon brought in a new body of priests, and later went on to found the Kek Lok Si temple at Ayer Itam (Penang).

== The 1905 Chinese Anti-American Boycott Movement ==
During the Chinese Anti-American Boycott Movement, Cheah Tek Soon (Xie Deshun) joined Gon Boon Tan (Wen Wedan), and others, in making speeches to further stir up feelings against America.

== Cheah Eu Ghee (谢有义) ==
His business partner was Cheah Eu Ghee, and together, in 1893, they were commissioned by Government, following a vote of $5,000 sanctioned by the Finance Committee of the Straits Settlements Legislative Council, to metal the road from Tanjong Tokong, all the way upwards to Tanjong Batu in Penang North, as part of the Government's move to improve the road there.

Through Cheah Eu Ghee, whose business interests included shipping, he had access to the influential members of the Penang Chinese Advisory Board, like George Cecil Wray (President of the Penang Chinese Advisory Board and Assistant Protector of the Chinese in Penang), Chew Sin Yong, Lim Hua Chiam, Tan Kim Keng, Tan Sim Ho, Yeoh Chean Liew, Khaw Boo Aun and Kee Lai Huat.

== Gift of a band stand ==
In 1884, Cheah Tek Soon made a gift to the municipality of a band stand, which soon, and thereafter until it was destroyed during the Japanese occupation, drew attention to itself, allowing some to fan the fires of that long competition between the older northern and younger southern settlements.

In May 1884, quoting their Penang correspondent, the Straits Times of Singapore published, "We are certainly ahead of you here in one little matter. We have a neat and convenient Band Stand on the Esplanade in front of the Town Hall, where the Police Band plays once or twice a week, and where such Bands as belong to vessels-of-war passing through may now find suitable accommodation for the afternoon (better still, moonlight!) performances, which they invariably give when here, greatly to the enlivenment of our somewhat humdrum life." The entry, which goes on at length, notes, "The cost of the whole affair was defrayed by a wealthy Chinese gentleman, and amounted, I am informed, to close on some £300—say $1,500." Cheah Tek Soon commissioned the Glasgow-based Macfarlane and Co. to create the iron bandstand.

In December's Free Press we read, "How wonderfully Penang has advanced in a few years. In my time, a quarter of a century ago, it was visited by the mail steamer once a fortnight, and only a few small sailing-vessels frequented the port. Now, I count seven large steamers, ten smaller ones, sailing vessels of all sizes, and innumerable native prahus lying around us. Instead of the few old-fashioned bungalows that lined the high street leading into the country, we have a handsome Town Hall; the Grand Hotel, built on the most fashionable lines, exceeding in beauty anything you have in Singapore ... The road-side trees, that used to be mere shrubs in my time, are great sturdy sons of the forest, affording ample share to the wayside traveller: they seemed to me chiefly Angsanas (I hope I have spelt the word rightly). In my time a ricketty old narrow pier sufficed It used to be called "Scandal Point," where the lads and lasses used to meet of an afternoon and retail to each other all the gup they had picked up during the day. I dare say the handsome Band-stand on the Esplanade answers the same purpose in this year of grace. Here the Penang Band performs once a week. Why should not Singapore have a Town Band? You see you are far behind old Penang."

Along with other structures like the Penang Sports Club (Cricket Section), the Penang Recreation Club (for Europeans), ornate benches and lamp posts, and the other Victorian cast-iron pavilion, the James Montague Bent Vermont's memorial, Cheah Tek Soon's Bandstand was destroyed by bombs during the Second World War.

== Cheah Tek Soon 5 Storey Mansion ==
Originally built in the 1880s by Cheah Tek Soon, this was the first five-story residence in Penang. It was said to be inspired by Raffles in Singapore and by 1910s, it was being referred to as Raffles-By-The-Sea. The pagoda-shaped structure featured a unique layered style that combined British and Chinese architectural elements. The building passed on to his daughter Cheah Liew Bee, who married Goh Say Eng, a supporter of Dr. Sun Yat Sen. Goh, who was selling his properties one by one to support Dr. Sun's revolutionary movement, sold this property too. Merchant Tye Kee Yoon bought it and turned it into a hotel. It has been known as the Bellevue Hotel. It was leased to the Government in the 1920s to be used as an English school, and became the Shih Chung branch school after the war. In 1993 it was acquired from the Tye trustees by the Malaysia Vegetable Oil Refinery Sdn Bhd, one of the major shareholders of Raffles-By-The-Sea Sdn. Bhd, for nine and a half million Malaysian Ringgit. With the purchase, the building which has through the years been reduced to three storeys, is to be restored and will surrounded by a three-block columbarium to be built by developers Raffles-By-The-Sea Sdn. Bhd.

== Methodist Girls' School ==
The gem that would become the Methodist Girls' School, Penang, began in the home of Cheah Tek Soon. Reverend Daniel D. Moore expanded the Methodist Mission to Penang when he went over there, from Singapore, in 1891. Without wasting time, Moore set out to visit wealthy Chinese homes in order to become acquainted with prominent Chinese citizens. One of these was the home of Cheah Tek Soon, who wished for his two little nieces to receive an education. Cheah Tek Soon's sister was persuaded to allow her daughters to be taught and a girls' school was started at the missionary residence, No. 1, Penang Road, in October 1891. The student population of what was to become the Anglo-Chinese Girls' School grew.

The Malaysia Message, an English-language Methodist magazine, noted, "In a Penang newspaper there is an advertisement of a girls' school which has lately been started in the Settlement by the Rev. S.S. Moore. It is called the 'Young Ladies' Anglo-Chinese and Indian School,' and is modelled after the young ladies' schools in England and the pupils are taught by competent lady teachers." That school would eventually grow to become the Methodist Girls' School.

== The case of Gan Kim Swee and Inspector C. C. Newland ==
When Inspector C. C. Newland, without provocation, assaulted Gan Kim Swee, a leading member of the Penang community, Cheah Tek Soon was among the leaders of the Chinese, Mahomedan and Hindu sections of the community who convened a public meeting, presided over by Captain Bowers, on 21 September 1878 at the office of Messrs. Bun Chin Hong. After it was determined to petition the Governor in complaint of the Inspector's assault of Gan Kim Swee, Cheah Tek Soon seconded the proposal by Verapa Chetty that a committee, made up of Cheah Eu Ghee, Golam Mydin, Verapa Chetty, Khoo Thean Teik, Choo Cheng Whey, Tan Yeow Chew, Ong Seon Tek, Oh Yean Heng, L. Seow Huck, Y. Hup Keat, Caderasah Merican and Lim Quan Cheang (Secretary), be appointed to develop and bring that petition to the Governor.

The Governor, upon receipt of this, ordered an official inquiry. Major Dunlop forwarded copies of the Straits Times containing the report of the public meeting at Penang to the Superintendent of Police, asking for an official explanation from him on the matter.

Inspector C. C. Newland was eventually tried before the Police Court on Monday 7 October 1878 before Mr. Gottlieb and was found guilty. And while he may have suffered a fine, as he did in an earlier prosecution brought against involving one Abdool Gunny, Gan Kim Swee, through his Solicitor, Mr. Ross, said he would accept an apology instead. Newland read out the apology in court.

== See also ==
- Pinang Gazette and Straits Chronicle, 6 July 1895
- The Big Five Hokkien Families in Penang, 1830s–1890s ©2007 Yeetuan Wong, Chinese Southern Diaspora Studies, Volume 1, 2007 南方華裔研究雜誌,第一卷, 2007
- The Directory & Chronicle for China, Japan, Corea, Indo-China, Straits Settlements, Malay States, Siam, Netherlands India, Borneo, the Philippines, &c.; with which are Incorporated "The China Directory" and "The Hongkong Directory and Hong List for the Far East" ... : With which are Incorporated ... Published by The Hong Kong Daily Press Office, 1894; Item notes: 1894; p. 393
- Journal of the Malayan Branch of the Royal Asiatic Society By Malaysian Branch, Royal Asiatic Society of Great Britain and Ireland Malaysian Branch, Singapore Published by, 1996; p. 41
- Parliamentary Papers By Great Britain Parliament. House of Commons, Parliament, Great Britain, House of Commons Published by HMSO, 1885; Item notes: 1884–1885:v.52; p. 241
- The Protected Malay States, 1874–1895 By Emily Sadka Published by University of Malaya Press, 1968; p. 431
- The demise of the revenue farm system in the Federated Malay States by JG Butcher – Modern Asian Studies, 1983
- 40 Years of Woman's Work in Malaya, 1887–1927 by Sophia Blackmore

=== Law Suits ===
- Penang Foundry Co v Cheah Tek Soon (1882) 1 Ky 559

=== Cheah Tek Soon 5 Storey Mansion ===
- by Quah, Seng-Sun
- Michael LaPalme
