= History of Penang =

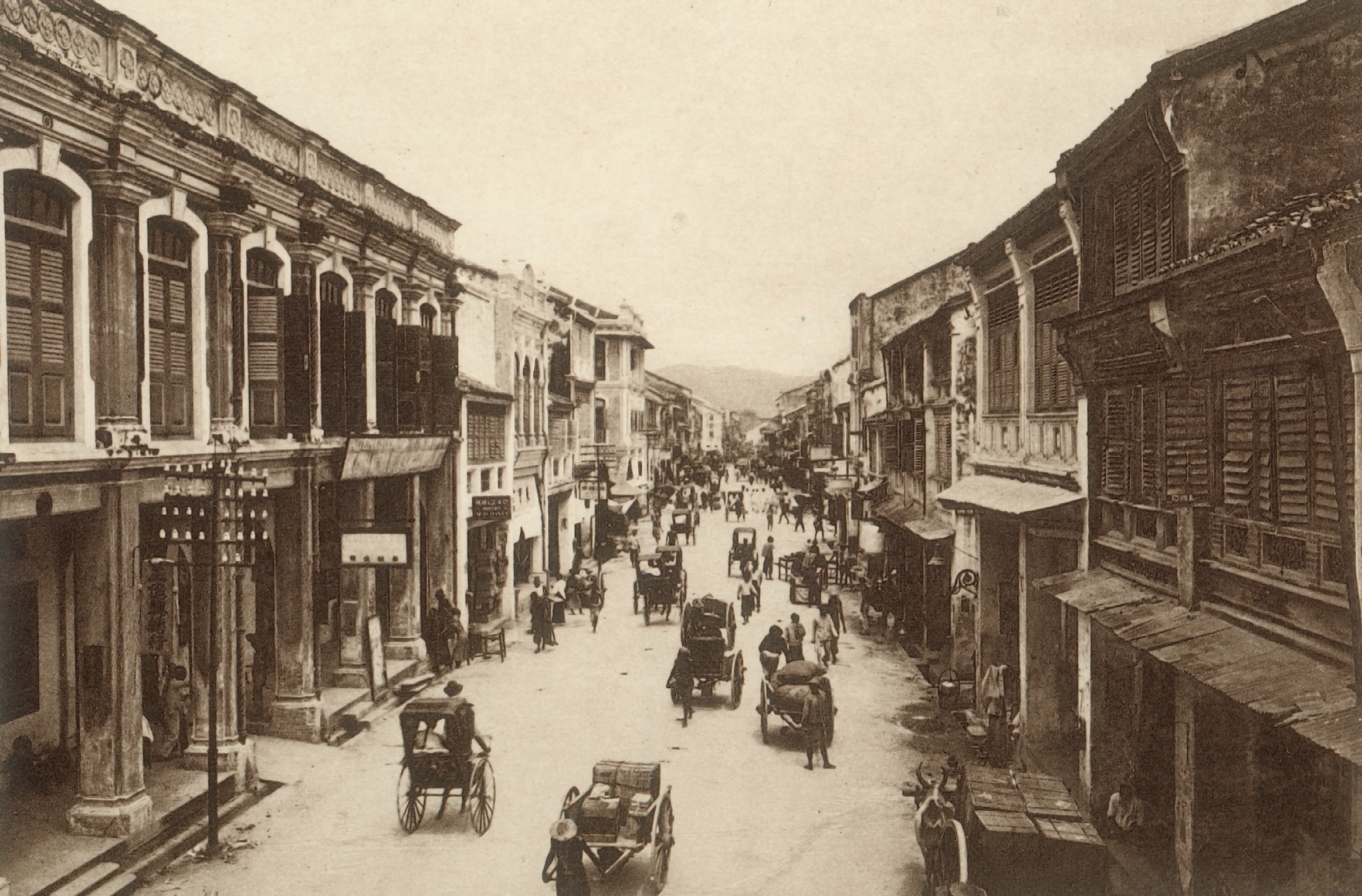
Beach Street, George Town in c. 1910

Historical population
Year	Pop.	±%
1881	190,597	—
1891	231,224	+21.3%
1901	247,808	+7.2%
1911	278,003	+12.2%
1921	304,335	+9.5%
1931	359,851	+18.2%
1947	446,321	+24.0%
1957	572,100	+28.2%
1970	776,124	+35.7%
1980	900,772	+16.1%
1991	1,064,166	+18.1%
2000	1,231,209	+15.7%
2010	1,526,324	+24.0%
2020	1,740,405	+14.0%

The State of Penang, one of the most developed and urbanised Malaysian states, is located at the nation's northwest coast along the Malacca Strait. To a greater degree than other Malaysian states, the history of modern Penang was shaped by British colonialism, beginning with the acquisition of Penang Island from the Sultanate of Kedah by the British East India Company in 1786. Developed into a free port, the city state was subsequently governed as part of the Straits Settlements, together with Singapore and Malacca; the state capital, George Town, briefly became the capital of this political entity between 1826 and 1832. By the end of the 19th century, George Town prospered and became one of the major entrepôts in Southeast Asia.

During World War II, Penang was conquered and occupied by the Japanese Empire from 1941 to 1945. At the end of the war, Penang was also the first state in the Malay Peninsula to be liberated by the British, under Operation Jurist. The Straits Settlements was dissolved in the following year and Penang was merged into the Federation of Malaya. In spite of a secession movement within Penang, the merger with Malaya went ahead and the federation attained independence from the British Empire in 1957. Malaya later evolved into the present-day Malaysia in 1963.

Following the revocation of George Town's free port status in the 1960s, the state suffered economic decline and massive unemployment. The state government at the time led a push to reorient the economy towards hi-tech manufacturing, successfully recovering Penang's economy and lending the state its moniker the Silicon Valley of the East. Growing recognition of George Town as a bustling tourist destination, particularly since the city's inscription as a UNESCO World Heritage Site in 2008, also boosted the state's services sector, and today, both the manufacturing and services sectors are the two strongest economic pillars of Penang. Moreover, the state enjoys one of the lowest unemployment rates and Gini coefficients within Malaysia, as well as the second highest gross domestic product (GDP) per capita within the country after Kuala Lumpur.

== Ancient Penang ==
Evidence of prehistoric human settlement in what is now Penang has been discovered in Guar Kepah within Seberang Perai (formerly Province Wellesley), the mainland half of Penang. Human remains, dating back to about 5,000 to 6,000 years ago, have been found at the site south of the Muda River, along with seashells, pottery and hunting tools. These indicate that Seberang Perai had been inhabited by nomadic Melanesians from as early as the Neolithic era.

Seberang Perai also became part of the Bujang Valley civilisation. The Cherok Tok Kun megalith in Bukit Mertajam, discovered in 1845, contains Pali inscriptions, indicating that an early Hindu-Buddhist political entity in what is now Kedah had established control over parts of Seberang Perai sometime between the 5th and 6th centuries. The entirety of what is now Penang would later form part of the Sultanate of Kedah up until the late 18th century.

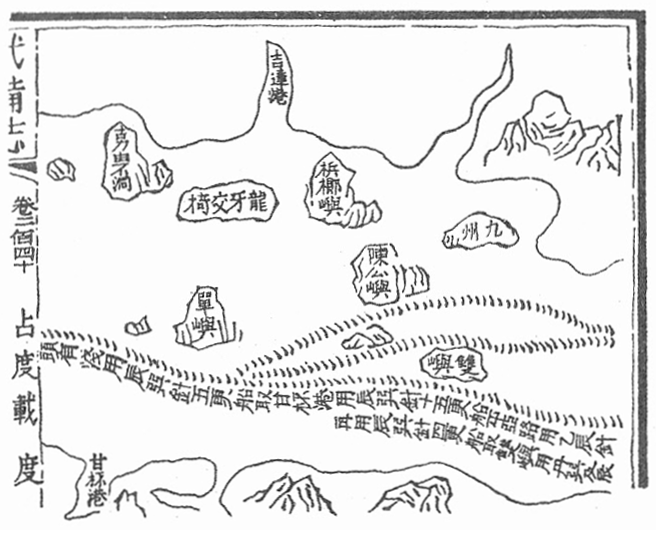
The Mao Kun map from Wubei Zhi, derived from the 15th century navigation maps of Zheng He, showing Penang Island (梹榔嶼)

Meanwhile, Penang Island was first documented by Chinese sailors of the Ming dynasty in the 15th century. At the time, Ming Emperor Yongle was in the midst of launching naval expeditions that would eventually reach all the way to eastern Africa. The island, known as Bīnláng Yù (simplified Chinese: 梹榔屿; traditional Chinese: 梹榔嶼), was mapped by Admiral Zheng He's fleet in the 'Nautical Charts of Zheng He'.

One of the first Englishmen to arrive on Penang Island was the privateer James Lancaster who commanded the Edward Bonaventure. He landed in June 1592 and remained on the island until September, pillaging every vessel he encountered. He was aided by Orang Asli he encountered in Seberang Prai.

Penang Island was also indicated as Pulo Pinaom in Portuguese historian Emanuel Godinho de Eredia's 1613 map of the Malay Peninsula.

In the early 18th century, ethnic Minangkabaus from Sumatra, led by Haji Muhammad Salleh (also known as Nakhoda Intan), landed on Penang Island, establishing a seaside settlement at Batu Uban in 1734. They were followed by the Arabs, who subsequently intermarried with the Minangkabau; this gave rise to the Arab-Minangkabau admixture now described as Malay, as they have assimilated into the local Malay community.

== Founding of Penang ==
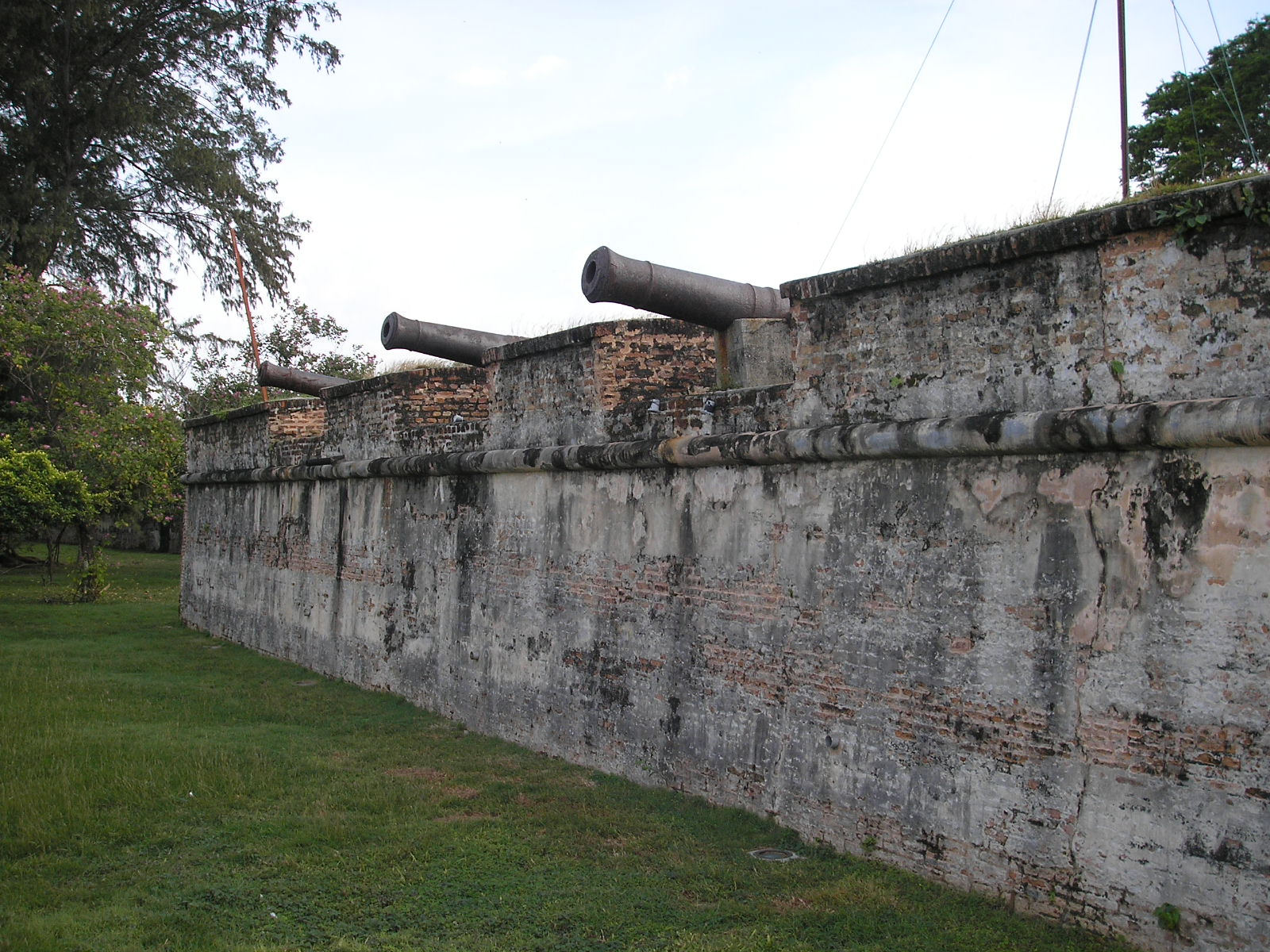
Fort Cornwallis, in the heart of George Town, was constructed at the spot where Francis Light first set foot on Penang Island.

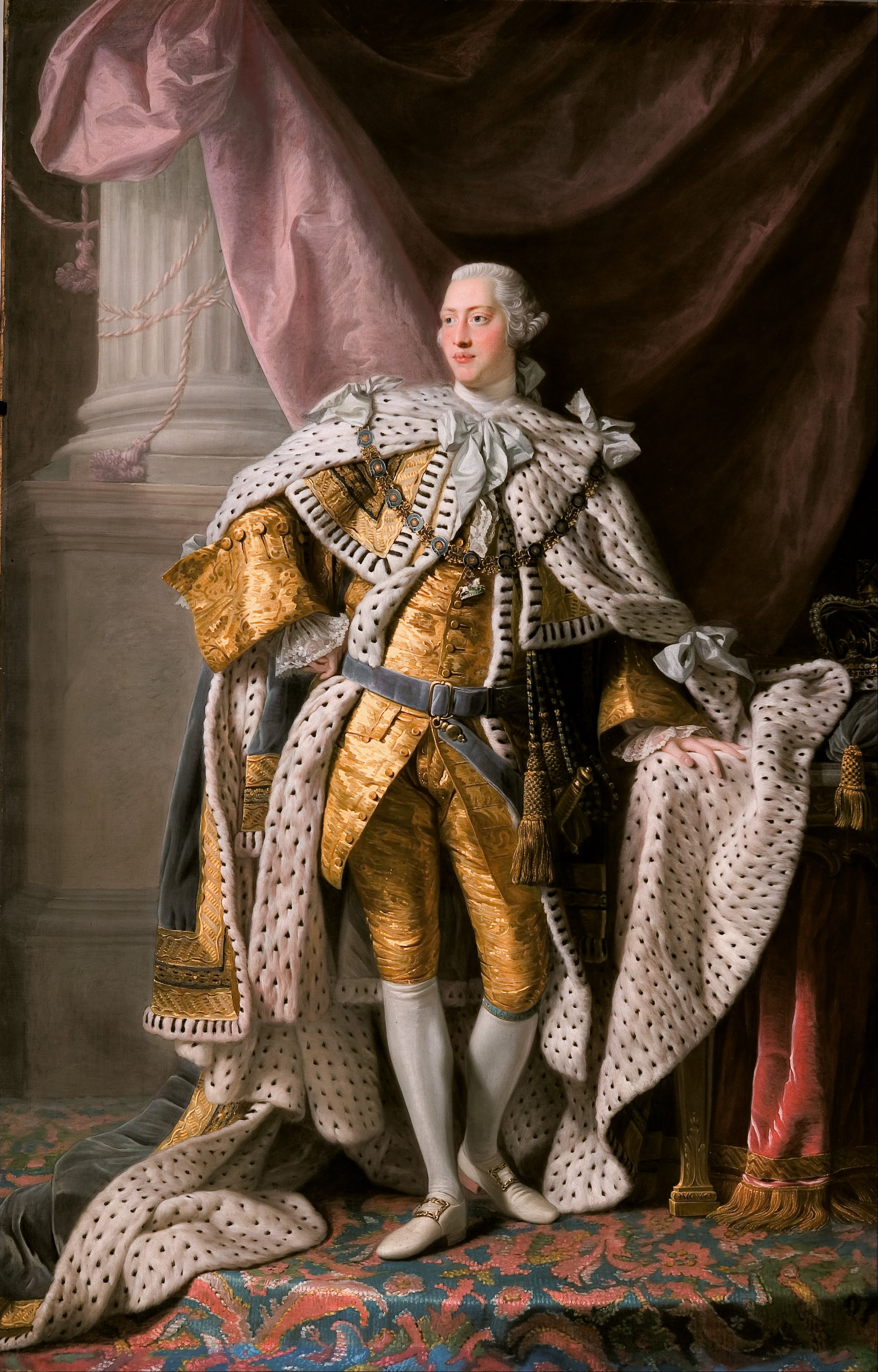
George Town was named after King George III, who reigned over the British Empire between 1760 and 1820. Coronation Portrait by Allan Ramsay, 1762.

The history of modern Penang only began in earnest in the late 18th century. Up until then, the Sultanate of Kedah, which had control over Penang, had maintained turbulent diplomatic relations with Siam to the north. In the 1770s, the British East India Company instructed Francis Light to establish trade relations in the Malay Peninsula. Light subsequently landed in Kedah, which at that point was threatened by both Siam and Burma, as well as an internal Bugis rebellion.

Aware of this situation, Light formed friendly relations with the then Sultan of Kedah, Sultan Muhammad Jiwa Zainal Adilin II, and promised British military protection. As part of his promises, Light assisted in the quelling of the Bugis revolt by recapturing a Bugis-held fort for the Sultan. The Sultan reciprocated by offering Penang Island to Light. Light subsequently wrote to his superiors regarding the offer, arguing that Penang Island could serve as a "convenient magazine for trade" and its strategic location would allow the British to check Dutch and French territorial gains in Southeast Asia. He also made the case that, with the other ports in the region, such as Aceh and Phuket, riddled with piracy and despotic governments, the British East India Company could seize the opportunity to establish a tranquil harbour on Penang Island conducive for free trade, noting that if "Malay, Bugis and Chinese will come to reside here, it will become the Exchange of the East if not loaded with impositions and restrictions".

However, nothing transpired until 1786, when by that point the British were fighting the Thirteen American Colonies, which were backed by France and the Netherlands. Faced with the Dutch dominance of the East Indies (now Indonesia) and a growing French threat, Light, who by then had risen to the rank of captain, was ordered to acquire Penang Island from Kedah. The British East India Company sought control of Penang Island as a Royal Navy base, and a trading post between China and the Indian subcontinent.

Light negotiated with the new Sultan of Kedah, Sultan Abdullah Mukarram Shah, regarding the cession of Penang Island to the British East India Company in exchange for British military assistance and a lease of 6,000 Spanish dollars to cancel Kedah's debts to Siam. With the agreement between Light and the Kedah Sultan successfully concluded, Light and his entourage sailed on to Penang Island, where they arrived on 17 July 1786. Fort Cornwallis would later be built at the spot where Light first set foot.

The area where Light first landed was originally a mangrove swamp covered in thick jungle. Once enough land was cleared, creating what is now the Esplanade, a ceremony was held on 11 August, during which the Union Jack was raised for the first time. This signified the formal possession of Penang Island by the British East India Company in the name of King George III. The island was renamed the Prince of Wales Island after the heir to the British throne, while the new settlement of George Town was established in honour of King George III. Thus, George Town became the first British settlement in Southeast Asia and a springboard for future British territorial expansion in the region, while its establishment by the British East India Company marked the start of a period of British imperialism in the Malay Peninsula.

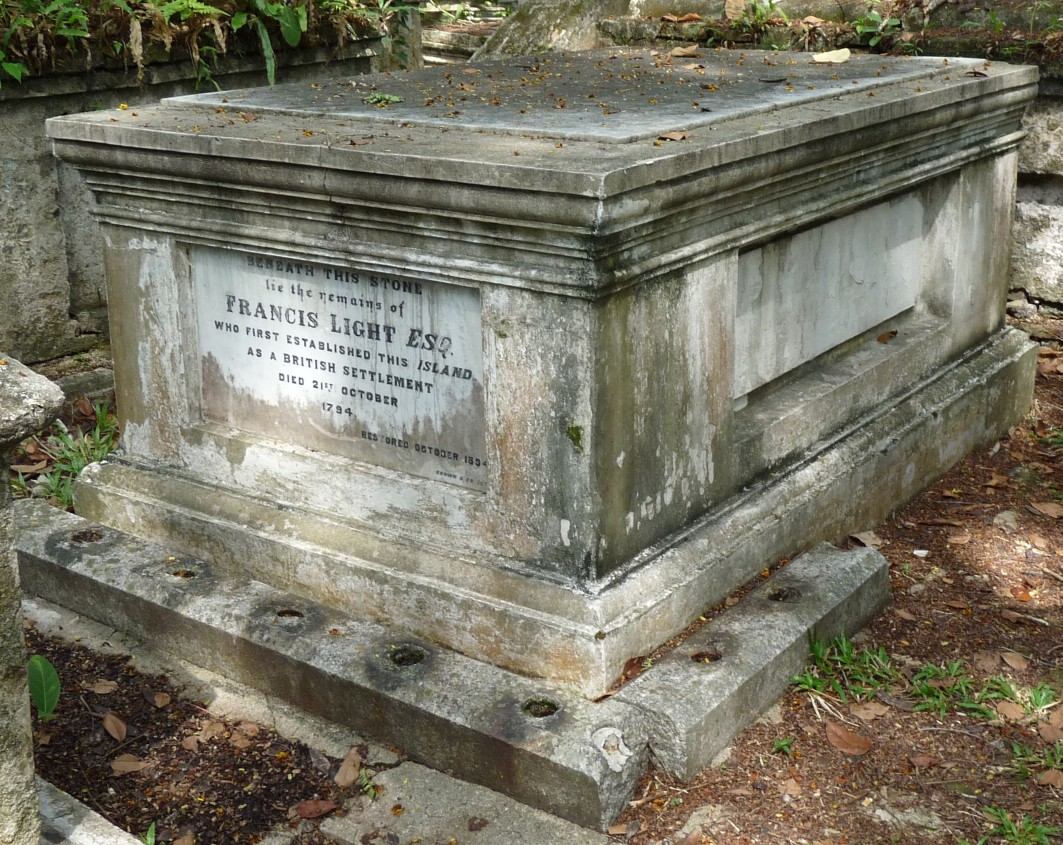
Francis Light's grave in the Old Protestant Cemetery in George Town

Unbeknownst to the Kedah Sultan, however, Light had acted without the authority or consent of his superiors in India. When Light reneged on his promise of British military protection against Siam, the Kedah Sultan in 1791 assembled an army in what is now Seberang Perai to retake the Prince of Wales Island. The Sultan's force was also assisted by a fleet of pirates. Fortunately for Light, his garrison on the island was reinforced by two companies from Calcutta. After failing to persuade the Sultan to disband his forces, the British East India Company launched amphibious assaults at night, destroying Kedah's military installations in Perai, and defeating both the pirates and the Sultan's army. Light died from malaria in 1794 and was buried within the Old Protestant Cemetery in George Town. To this day, Light is honoured as the founding father of Penang.

In 1800, the first Lieutenant-Governor of Prince of Wales Island, Sir George Leith, gained a 189.3 km^{2} (73.1 sq mi) strip of Seberang Perai from the new Sultan of Kedah. The treaty, negotiated by Leith's First Assistant George Caunter, superseded Light's earlier agreement and gave the British permanent sovereignty over both Prince of Wales Island and the newly ceded mainland territory, which in subsequent years was named Province Wellesley.

The newly acquired land, which included a five-kilometre stretch of coastline south of the Perai River, turned the river into the international border between Province Wellesley and Kedah. At the time, Province Wellesley was heavily forested and sparsely populated, with a total population of only 5,000. The treaty gave Prince of Wales Island the entire command of its harbour for the first time, as well as control of the vulnerable mainland coastline, home to pirates and brigands. It further gave the island a controlled source of food and increased the value of its opium and arack farms. It provided for the free flow of food and commodities from Kedah to Prince of Wales Island and Province Wellesley. For Kedah it provided a protective strip against enemy attack from the sea. In exchange for this acquisition, the annual payment to the Kedah Sultan was increased to 10,000 Spanish dollars per annum. To this day, the Malaysian federal government still pays Kedah, on behalf of Penang, RM10,000 annually as a symbolic gesture.

Following the original acquisition in 1800, Province Wellesley was gradually expanded up to its present-day boundaries in 1874, when the Pangkor Treaty, which included the delineation of Province Wellesley's southern borders, was signed between the British and the neighbouring Sultanate of Perak. Province Wellesley thus gained the town of Sungai Acheh from Perak.

== Early growth ==
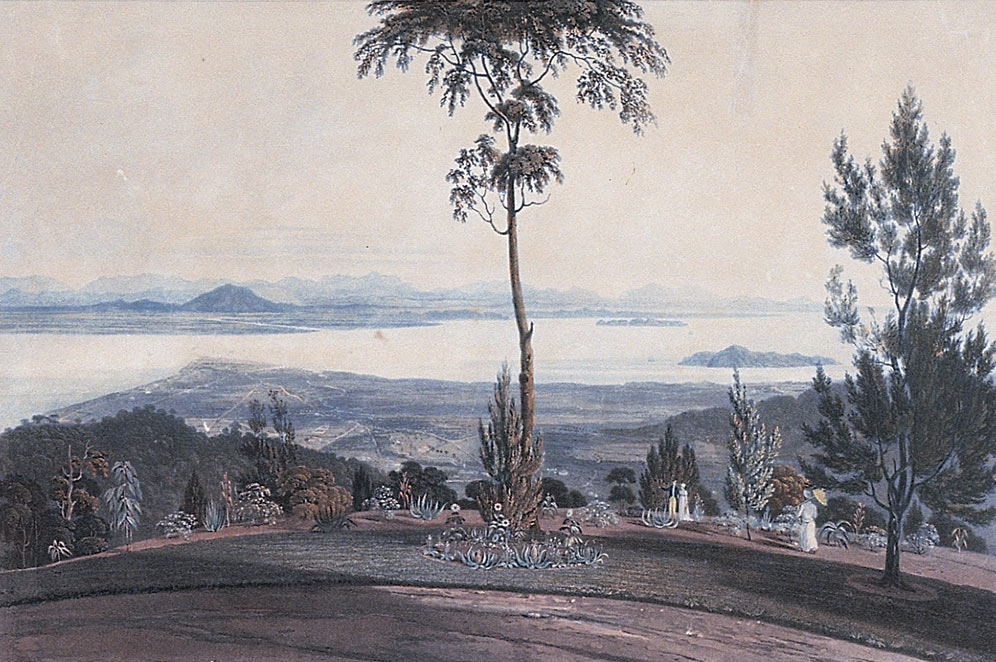
1818 painting of George Town and Province Wellesley (in the horizon), as seen from a hilltop

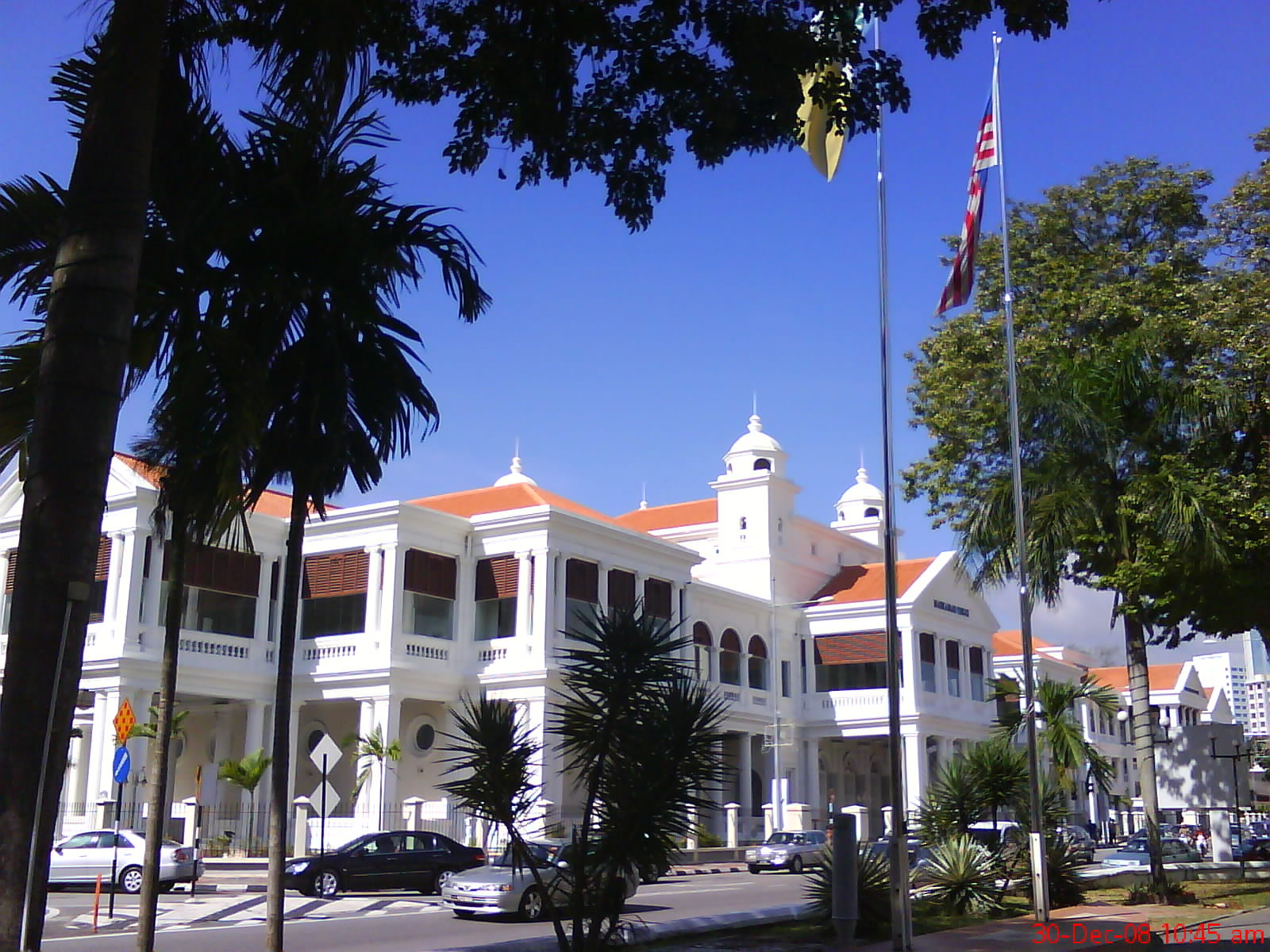
The High Court of Penang, in George Town, was established in 1808, making it the birthplace of Malaysia's modern-day judiciary.

Francis Light had established George Town as a free port, thus allowing merchants to trade without having to pay any form of tax or duties. In effect, this measure was intended to entice merchants from the Dutch ports in the region. As a result, the number of incoming vessels increased exponentially from 85 in 1786 to 3,569 in 1802; George Town's population had also risen to 10,000 by 1792. Immigrants came from various parts of Asia; in 1801, the then Lieutenant-Governor of the Prince of Wales Island, Sir George Leith, remarked that "there is not, probably, any part of the world where, in so small a space, so many different people are assembled together or so great a variety of languages spoken". For example, in May 1787 Light appointed Koh Lay Huan as the colony's first Kapitan Cina, after Koh arrived shortly after Light with several boatloads of Chinese and Malays to develop the island. A committee of assessors was also established for George Town in 1800, making it the first local government to be established within British Malaya.

The Prince of Wales Island, together with Province Wellesley, had been administered under the Bengal Presidency until 1805, when Penang was made a separate Presidency on par with Madras, Bombay and Bengal. By then, Penang also served as a penal station; in 1796, 700 Indian convicts were shipped in from the Andaman Islands. The practice of employing Indian convicts continued throughout the 19th century as a means to provide the necessary labour for public infrastructure works, such as the construction of roads, drains and public buildings.

In 1807, a royal charter to provide for the establishment of a Supreme Court and a police force in Penang was granted. The Supreme Court of Penang was first opened at Fort Cornwallis in George Town in 1808, with Edmond Stanley assuming office as its first Recorder (Judge). In the decades that followed, Penang's judiciary and the police force were progressively applied to the Straits Settlements, and later copied throughout British Malaya. Hence, Penang was the birthplace of the present-day Malaysian judiciary system, as well as the Royal Malaysian Police.

In the early 19th century, Penang became a centre of spice production and trade within Southeast Asia. The cultivation of pepper began soon after the founding of George Town in 1786. The production of spices, including nutmeg and clove, gradually grew more varied and the booming spice trade led to the opening of spice farms all over Penang. The export of spices through the Port of Penang also enabled the British East India Company to cover the administrative costs of Penang. Furthermore, the agricultural plantations would fuel the growth of several villages, such as Air Itam and Balik Pulau on the island, and Bukit Mertajam in Province Wellesley. Malay refugees fleeing the Siamese invasion of Kedah and Chinese immigrants formed the bulk of workers in these agricultural estates. Other areas, such as Bayan Lepas on the island and Kepala Batas in Province Wellesley, were founded as rice-producing estates.

== Straits Settlements ==
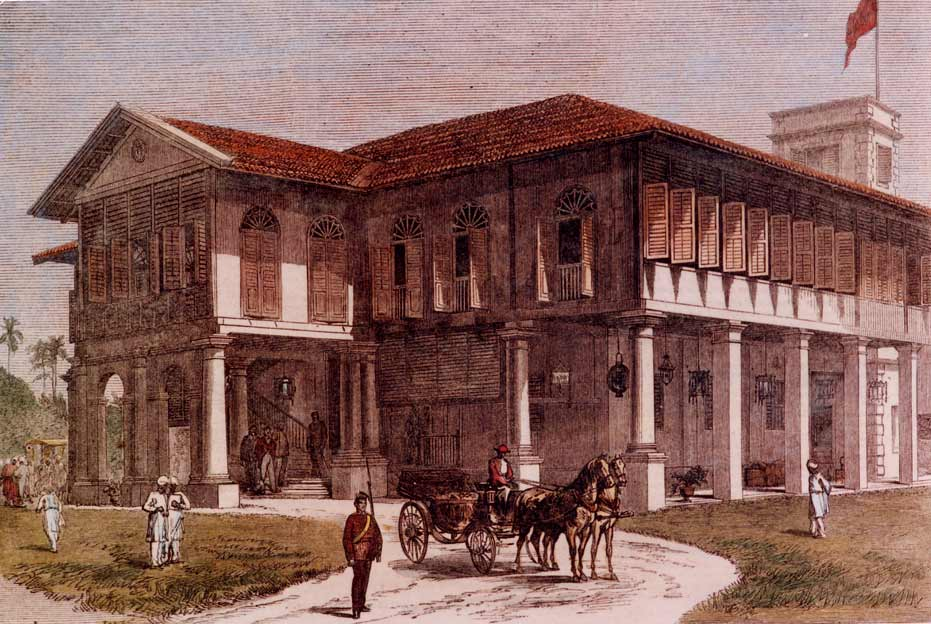
Edinburgh House, at the site of present Dewan Sri Pinang, was occupied by the Duke of Edinburgh on his 1869 visit.

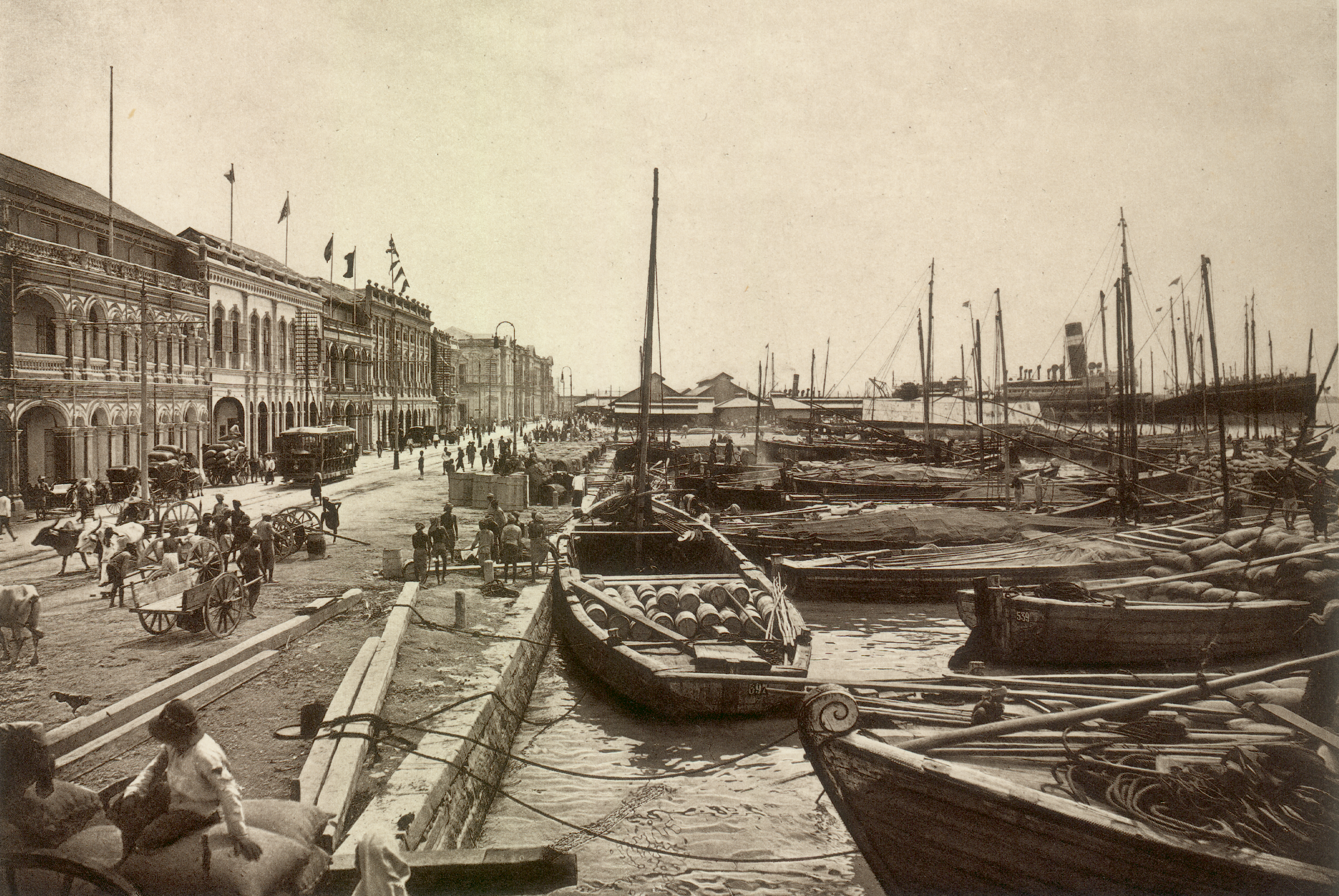
The Port of Penang at Weld Quay, in George Town, in 1910. Weld Quay was reclaimed from the sea in the 1880s.

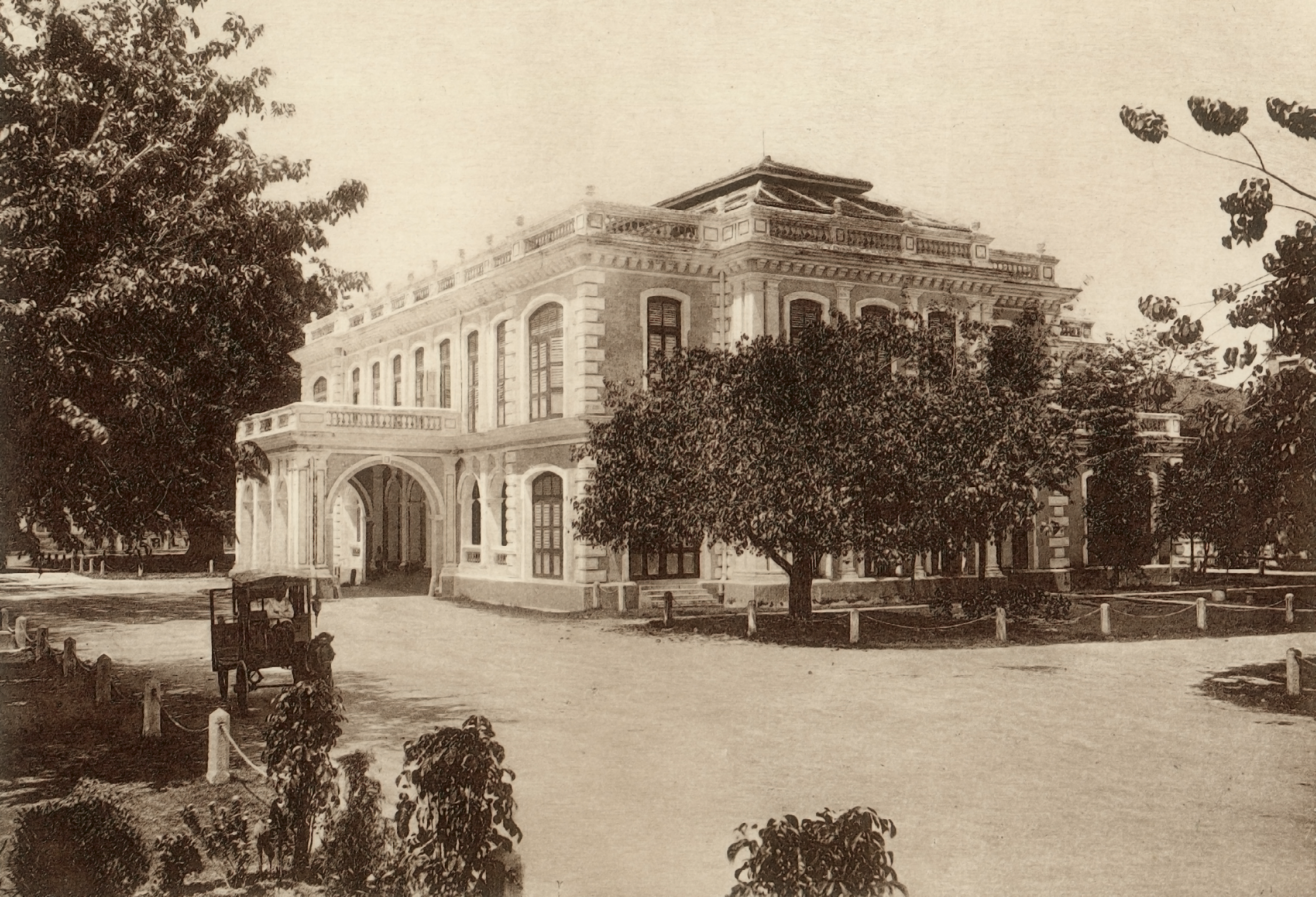
Town Hall of Penang, circa. 1910.

In 1826, the British East India Company amalgamated the territories of Penang, Singapore (acquired from Johor in 1819), and Malacca (acquired from the Netherlands in 1824) into a single political entity, the Straits Settlements. George Town was made the administrative and judicial capital of the new entity. However, owing to Singapore's more strategic geographical location between the Malacca Strait and the South China Sea, the Port of Singapore rapidly surpassed the Port of Penang as the preeminent harbour in the region. Consequently, Singapore replaced George Town as the capital of the Straits Settlements in 1832.

Nonetheless, George Town continued to retain its importance as a vital British entrepôt by funneling the exports meant for global shipping lines which had bypassed other regional harbours. In the latter half of the 19th century, the tin mining boom within the neighbouring Sultanate of Perak and Siam brought more prosperity to Penang. Tin produced from within the Kinta Valley and southern Siam were transported to George Town for smelting, before being exported via the Port of Penang to European and American industries. The Port of Penang subsequently became a major tin-exporting harbour within British Malaya, directly challenging the Port of Singapore. The opening of the Suez Canal in 1869 and the advent of steamships further cemented the Port of Penang's importance as a major entrepôt within British Malaya. By the end of the 19th century, George Town also evolved into a leading financial centre of British Malaya, as mercantile firms and international banks, including Standard Chartered and HSBC, flocked into the city.

By then, Penang became home to a myriad of ethnicities and religious affinities. Aside from the sizeable Chinese, Malay, Indian, Peranakan, Eurasian, and Siamese communities, the colony's multi-ethnic and multi-religious society included significant minorities of Burmese, British, Javanese, Japanese, Sinhalese, Jewish, German, and Armenian origin.

At the time, each ethnic community had a tendency to specialise in specific trades and economic sectors. While the Europeans predominated in the various professional fields, as well as occupying managerial positions in mercantile and shipping firms, the Peranakans and the Eurasians tended to enter the nascent civil service as lawyers, engineers, architects and clerks. Some of the newer Chinese arrivals, labelled condescendingly by the Peranakans as Sinkheh (Chinese: 新客; meaning new guests), were coolies and agricultural farmers, although many eventually entered into commercial, trading and real estate enterprises within the city; certain dialect communities, such as the Cantonese and the Hakka, predominated as artisans, blacksmiths, carpenters and cooks. The Indians, who were first brought in as convict workers for public works, also began competing with the Chinese in commercial, trading and shipping stevedore activities. Ethnic Malays, meanwhile, were primarily engaged in agricultural occupations, including rice farming and fishing. Other ethnic communities, such as the Jews and the Armenians, were mainly engaged in mercantile and commercial ventures; the latter community was notable for the establishment of the Eastern & Oriental Hotel, for instance.

The rapid population growth that resulted from the booming economy led to several social problems, chiefly the inadequate sanitation and public health facilities, as well as rampant crime. The latter was brought about by an influx of Chinese immigrants, which led to the formation of feuding triads and secret societies. Turf wars between the triads worsened, and when the Straits Settlements authorities attempted to put a stop to the triad activities in 1857, the Chinese triads came into conflict against the British-led police force as well. This culminated in the Penang Riots of 1867 in the streets of George Town, when the Kean Teik Tong, led by Khoo Thean Teik and the Red Flag, clashed against the alliance of the Ghee Hin Kongsi and the White Flag. The resulting civil unrest lasted for 10 days, before the turf war was eventually quelled by the Straits Settlements authorities under newly appointed Lieutenant-Governor Edward Anson, who were assisted by European residents and reinforcements from Singapore.

Also in the same year, the Straits Settlements was made a British crown colony, thereby placing the administration of Penang, Singapore and Malacca directly under the Colonial Office in London. Direct British rule meant better enforcement of the rule of law, as Penang's police force was vastly beefed up and the secret societies that had plagued George Town during the preceding decades were gradually outlawed.

Meanwhile, in Province Wellesley, new railway lines were being constructed, with the first railroad being the Bukit Mertajam-Perai line in 1899. The town of Butterworth was also established in the mid-19th century as the transportation hub within Province Wellesley. In 1894, the first cross-strait ferry service between George Town and Butterworth commenced operations, and would eventually evolve into the present-day Rapid Ferry.

With improved access to education and rising living standards, Penang soon enjoyed substantial press freedom and there was a greater degree of participation in municipal affairs by its Asian residents. Penang's representatives in the Straits Settlements Legislative Council gained a reputation for their assertive contestation of the policies made by the Singapore-based British authorities, which sometimes went against Penang's interests.

On top of that, George Town, perceived as being more intellectually receptive than Singapore, also served as a magnet for well known English authors, Asian intellectuals and reformists. For instance, the Chinese revolutionary leader, Sun Yat-sen, chose to relocate his Southeast Asian base from Singapore to George Town, where he continued his efforts to reorganise and raise funds for the Chinese revolutionary movement against the Qing dynasty. These efforts culminated in the famous 1910 Penang conference, which paved the way to the ultimately triumphant Wuchang uprising that overthrew the Manchu imperial government of China.

== World wars ==
=== World War I ===
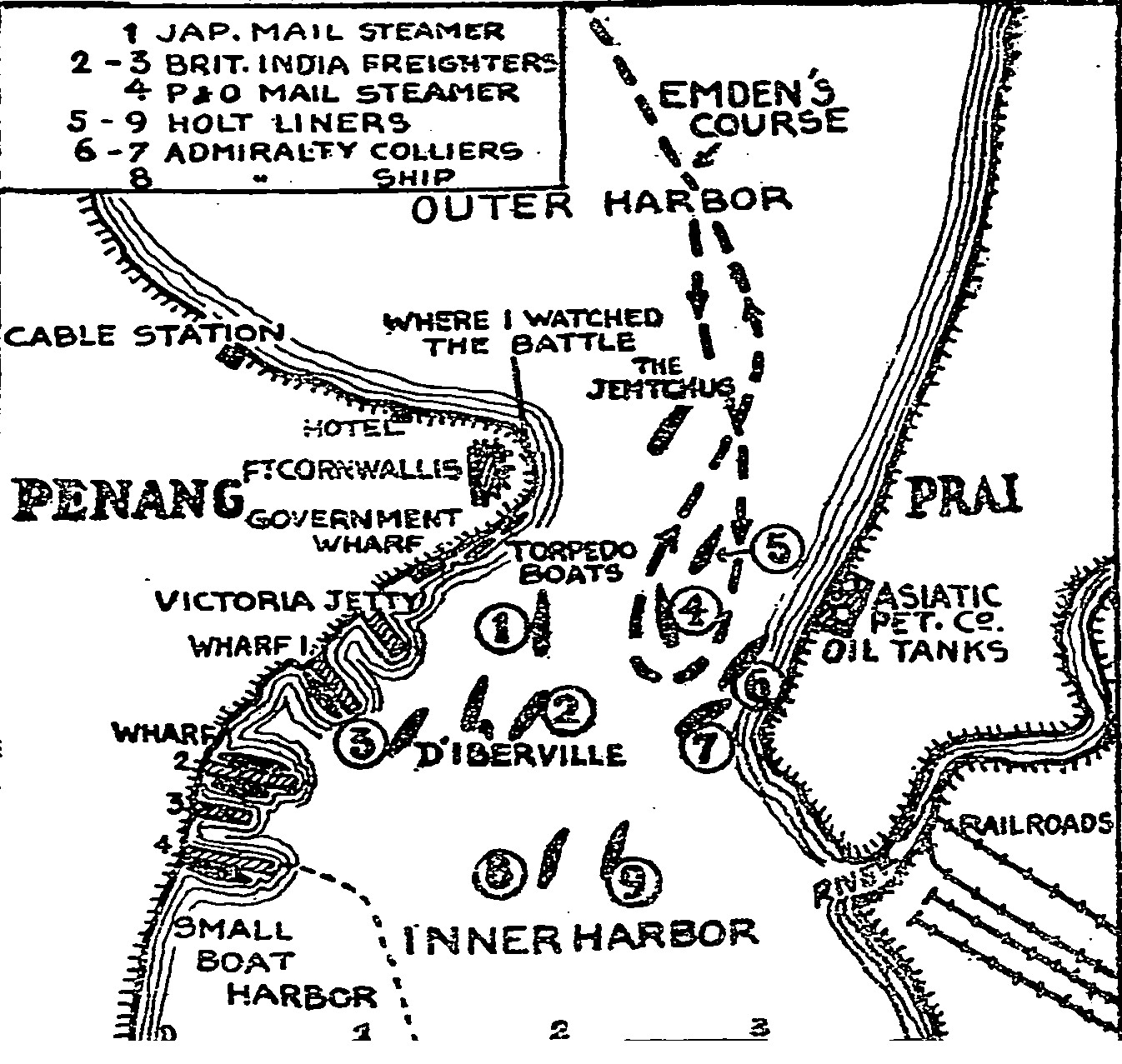
1914 map from The New York Times of the Battle of Penang

On 28 October 1914, the Battle of Penang occurred, during which an Imperial German Navy cruiser, SMS Emden, covertly sailed into George Town and sank the Imperial Russian Navy cruiser, Zhemchug. The French Navy destroyer, Mousquet, set off in pursuit, before being sunk by SMS Emden as well off the northwestern tip of Penang Island. 147 French and Russian sailors perished, while the survivors were rescued by local Malay fishermen.

Aside from the naval battle, Penang, as well as the Straits Settlements, was largely unaffected by the events of World War I.

=== World War II ===
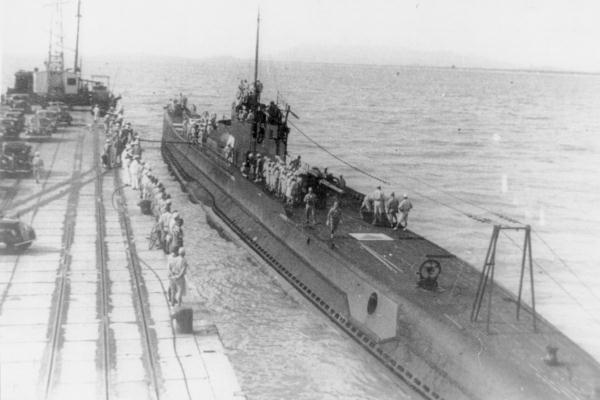
An Imperial Japanese Navy submarine at the Port of Penang in George Town in 1942

World War II, on the other hand, unleashed unprecedented social and political upheaval to Penang. The swift British retreat, coupled with the brutal massacres of Penang's Chinese residents, would severely dent British sense of prestige and dominance in the eyes of the locals.

From 9 until 18 December 1941, Japanese warplanes indiscriminately strafed and bombed George Town, in the process eliminating the obsolete Royal Air Force and Royal Australian Air Force squadrons based in RAF Butterworth and the Bayan Lepas Aerodrome (now Penang International Airport). It was estimated that 600 civilians were killed as a result of the Japanese bombardment, with an additional 1,100 wounded.

Notwithstanding the fact that the British Army had earlier designated Penang Island as a fortress, Lieutenant-General Arthur Percival then ordered a withdrawal from Penang. Not only did the British Army abandon the Batu Maung Fort on the island, they also surreptitiously evacuated Penang's European population, leaving the colony's Asian populace to the mercy of the impending Japanese occupation. To this day, it has been agreed that the withdrawal and the covert evacuation of Europeans led to the loss of the British sense of invincibility, and that "the moral collapse of British rule in Southeast Asia came not in Singapore, but in Penang".

Penang fell to the Imperial Japanese Army on 19 December 1941, marking the start of a period of Japanese occupation. Penang Island was renamed Tojo-to, after the Japanese Prime Minister at the time, Hideki Tojo. George Town's harbour facilities were also put to use as a major Axis submarine base in Southeast Asia.

The Japanese enacted dissimilar policies with each ethnic community. Ethnic Chinese residents arguably suffered the most brutal treatment, as the Imperial Japanese Army massacred thousands of Chinese as part of the Sook Ching campaign to rid what was perceived as anti-Japanese elements in the society. Penang's womenfolk were also coerced to work as comfort women by the Imperial Japanese Army.

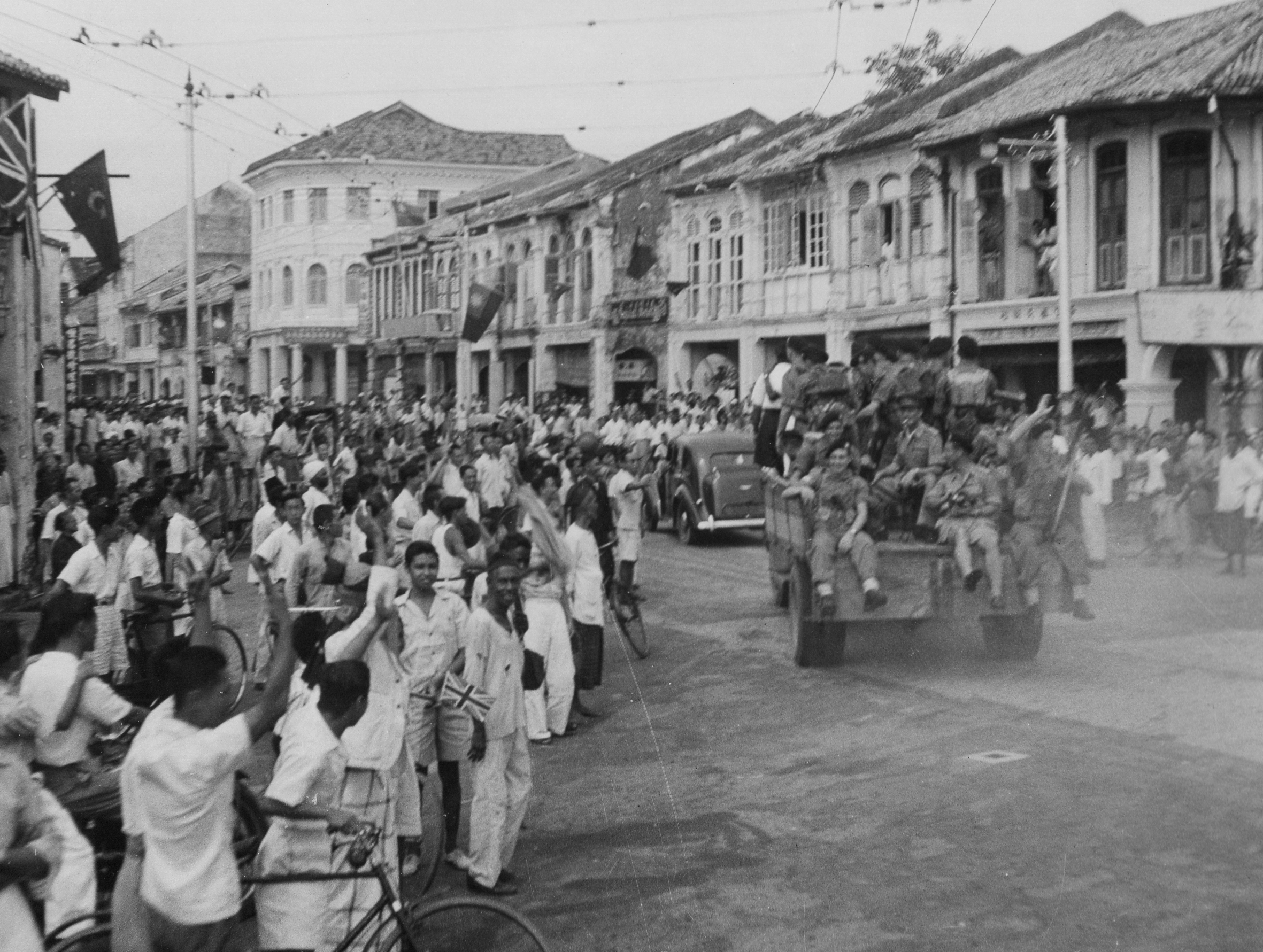
Royal Marines parading through a liberated George Town, 3 September 1945

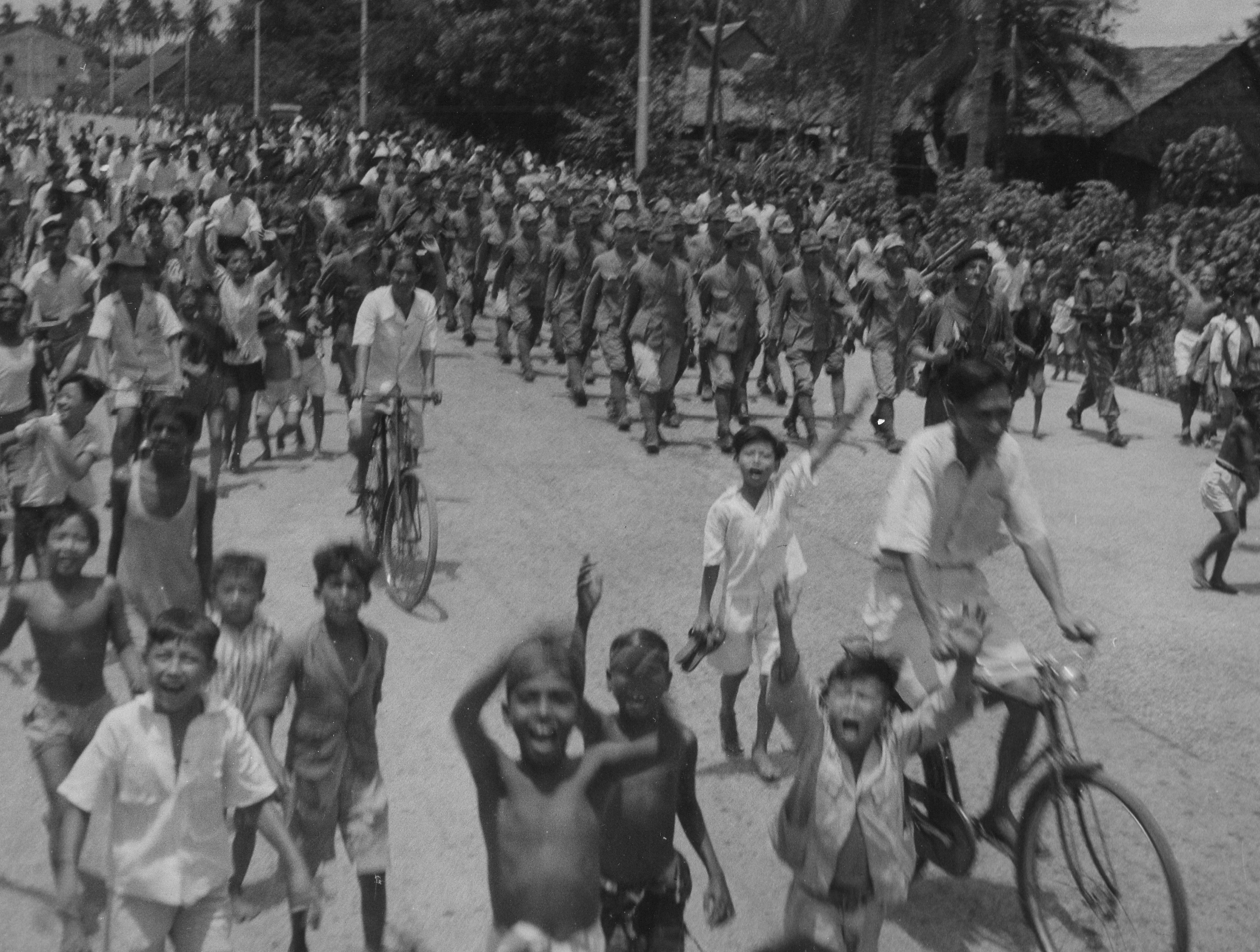
Japanese prisoners of war being marched through George Town, 3 September 1945

Penang's residents also had to endure economic hardship during the Japanese occupation, with hyperinflation caused by the oversupply of the Japanese-issued 'banana' dollars, and the acute shortage of food and raw materials, due to a combination of Japanese wartime rationing and an Allied blockade of Japanese shipping. Households were forced to turn to secondary crops such as sweet potatoes, yam and tapioca for their own subsistence. Beginning in 1942, a standardised Japanese curricula was enforced in all schools throughout Penang, with Japanese as the official language. In fact, social lifestyles were also greatly impacted, as it became compulsory to bow to Japanese soldiers on guard duty and to sing the Japanese national anthem, whilst whole streets and shops were renamed in Japanese.

Between 1944 and 1945, Royal Air Force and United States Army Air Force bomber squadrons based in India repeatedly launched bombing raids on George Town, seeking to destroy naval and administrative facilities. The destruction of the Penang Secretariat building by the Allied bombardment caused the loss of a large part of the British and Japanese records concerning Penang Island, complicating post-war efforts to compile a comprehensive history of Penang. The Penang Strait was also mined as part of efforts to constrict Japanese shipping.

Following the Japanese surrender on 15 August 1945, the Penang Shimbun, a Japanese newspaper, published the proclamation of surrender issued by the Emperor of Japan. Under Operation Jurist, a British Royal Navy fleet accepted the surrender of the Japanese garrison in Penang on 2 September 1945. A British Royal Marines contingent recaptured Penang Island on the following day, making George Town the first city in Malaya to be liberated at the end of the war.

== Post-war ==
Penang was placed under a military administration until 1946, as the British sought to restore order in the face of an emerging Communist insurgency. The British also dissolved the Straits Settlements in April 1946, with Sir Shenton Thomas being its last Governor; Penang and Malacca were then merged with the Federated Malay States and the Unfederated Malay States to form the Malayan Union (the new Colony of Singapore, excluded from this union, was to remain firmly under British rule). The Malayan Union was replaced by the Federation of Malaya in 1948. As the gradual withdrawal of the Western colonial powers in Southeast Asia continued taking shape, the independence of Malaya as a united political entity seemed a foregone conclusion.

However, the merger of the British crown colony of Penang into the vast Malay heartland alarmed some quarters of Penang's population. Questions were raised over economic and ethnic issues, such as the citizenship of non-Malays, greater trade regulations imposed on Penang by the central government in Kuala Lumpur and the introduction of export duties for trade with the rest of Malaya. Consequently, the Penang Secessionist Committee, formed in 1948, proposed to exclude Penang from the Federation of Malaya, which would allow Penang to either retain its links with the British Empire or form a political union with Singapore. The movement was led by D.A. Mackay, then the chairman of the Penang Chamber of Commerce, and included the Penang Muslim Chamber of Commerce, the Penang Chinese Chamber of Commerce, the Penang Straits Chinese Association, the Penang Eurasian Association and the Penang Indian Chamber of Commerce.

Ultimately, the Penang Secession Committee failed to attain its goals and petered out. A secession motion tabled in the Penang Settlement Council in 1949 was narrowly dismissed by British official votes, while another petition sent to London also met with British disapproval. While some British and American observers were sympathetic to the secessionists' cause, the British administrators were reluctant to jeopardise their own plans to gradually grant independence to a united Malayan polity. Moreover, the British government allayed the fears raised by the secessionists by guaranteeing George Town's free port status and by reintroducing municipal elections for the city in 1951.

On 1 January 1957, George Town, the capital of Penang, was granted city status by Queen Elizabeth II in 1957, becoming the first city within the Federation of Malaya, and by extension, Malaysia. George Town continued to be the only city within Malaysia (other than Singapore between 1963 and its Separation in 1965) until 1972, when Kuala Lumpur was also conferred city status.

Penang, as part of the Federation of Malaya, gained independence from the British Empire on 31 August 1957, and subsequently became a member state of Malaysia in 1963.

== Post-independence ==
=== 1957–1969 ===
Penang's political landscape immediately after the independence of Malaya became relatively fractured. The new Penang state government was dominated by the Alliance coalition (now succeeded by Barisan Nasional), the same ruling coalition that controlled the Malayan federal government. Wong Pow Nee of the Malaysian Chinese Association (MCA), one of the major component parties of the Alliance, became Penang's first Chief Minister, a position that he held until 1969. On the other hand, the Labour Party, a left-wing opposition party, took control of the George Town City Council soon after the Malayan independence. Penang's voters tended to leave the control of the state government in the hands of the Alliance, while consistently electing the Labour Party to run the city council.

At the time, the George Town City Council was the only fully elected local authority in Malaya, as well as the country's richest, with an annual revenue that was double that of the Penang state government by 1965. This solidified the financial autonomy of the city council, with its revenue going into social welfare projects within George Town. Meanwhile, the Penang state government attempted to boost the state's manufacturing sector by opening new industrial estates in Seberang Perai, such as in Perai and Mak Mandin. Exacerbated by the opposing political affinities and ideologies, conflicts frequently arose between the state government and the city council over differences in policies and budget allocations.

As previously guaranteed by the British authorities, George Town's free port status was untouched in the years immediately after the Malayan independence. The earlier fears by the secessionists eventually came true, however, when in 1969, the free port status was suddenly revoked by the Malaysian federal government. Consequently, 16.4% of Penang's working population became unemployed as the Port of Penang's trade volume plummeted, adversely affecting George Town's services sector. In the long run, this also marked the beginning of George Town's slow, decades-long decline, which was only recently reversed.

The revocation of George Town's free port status, coupled with an unsuccessful, bloody strike by Penang's unions in 1967, led to a loss of popular support for the Alliance amongst Penangites. During the 1969 state election, Gerakan, then an opposition party, was voted into power in Penang, replacing the Alliance. The party's founder, Lim Chong Eu, succeeded Wong Pow Nee as the Chief Minister of Penang. However, the violent race riots in Kuala Lumpur following the concurrent Malaysian General Elections led to the nationwide imposition of martial law and the functions of the Penang state government were taken over by the National Operations Council until 1971.

=== 1970–1990 ===
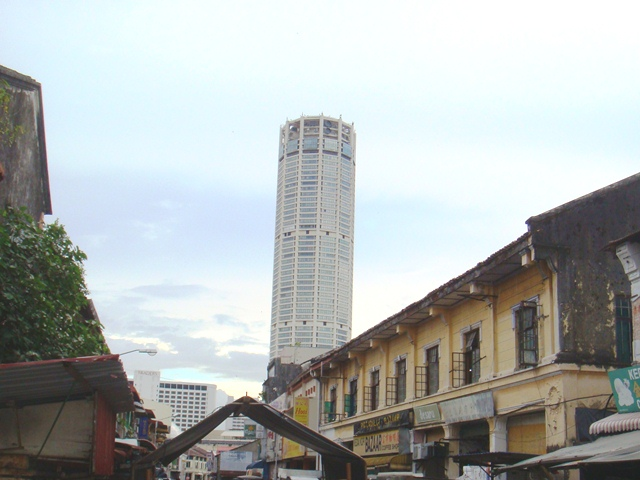
Constructed in 1974, the Komtar Tower in George Town is Penang's tallest skyscraper.

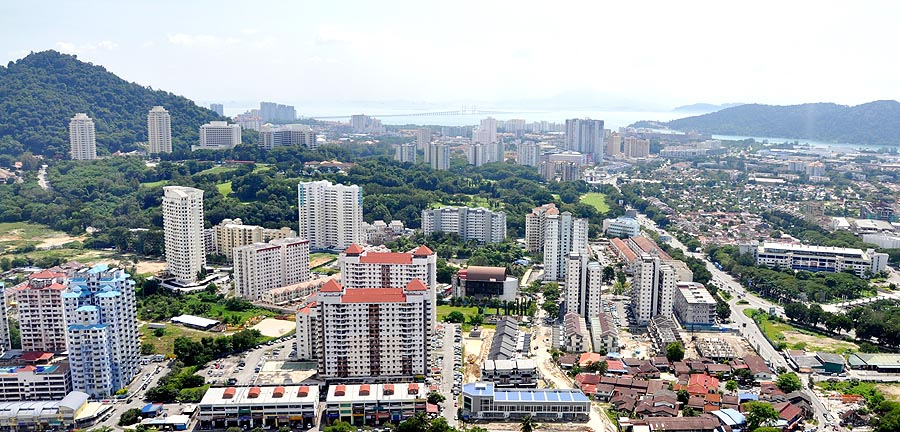
The township of Bayan Baru was first developed by the Penang Development Corporation in the 1970s, following the establishment of the adjacent Bayan Lepas Free Industrial Zone.

In 1973, Gerakan joined Barisan Nasional, thus returning the Penang state government back into the hands of the ruling coalition.

To revive Penang's economy, Lim Chong Eu created the Bayan Lepas Free Industrial Zone and courted foreign multinational corporations for investments. Pioneer tax status was granted to multinational firms seeking to establish assembly plants within Bayan Lepas, which was formerly the rice bowl of Penang. Major electronic and engineering firms, including Motorola, Bosch, Hewlett-Packard and Hitachi, flocked in, setting up assembly plants within the area. Complemented by cheap labour, the Bayan Lepas Free Industrial Zone, one of the major electronics manufacturing zones in Asia, grew to become the Silicon Valley of the East and was instrumental in pulling Penang out from its economic slump, greatly propelling the state's economy as one of the main economic powerhouses within Malaysia. To this day, manufacturing remains one of Penang's two largest economic sectors, contributing as much as 47.4% of Penang's GDP as of 2015.

During Lim's tenure, several major infrastructure projects were completed. The Penang Bridge, then the longest bridge in Southeast Asia, was completed in 1985, thus providing for the first time a road link between Penang Island and the Malay Peninsula. More controversial was the 250 m (820 ft)-tall Komtar in George Town, to this day the tallest skyscraper in Penang. Launched in 1974 as part of his vision to reverse George Town's declining fortunes, Komtar was constructed in the expense of hundreds of shophouses, schools and temples, as well as whole streets, which were bulldozed for the project. However, instead of arresting George Town's decline, Komtar itself became a white elephant by the early 2000s.

Meanwhile, in 1974, the Port of Penang was relocated from George Town to the town of Butterworth, directly across the Penang Strait, to allow for the berthing of larger container and cargo vessels. By then, the maritime traffic through Penang had been greatly diminished since the revocation of George Town's free port status, with increasing volumes of maritime trade being directed towards Port Klang near Kuala Lumpur instead.

Throughout the 1970s and 80s, the Malaysian federal government proceeded with the rapid development of Kuala Lumpur and nearby Port Klang, by controlling investments in communication, transport, education and health. Kuala Lumpur soon outstripped George Town as Malaysia's largest city and financial centre, while Port Klang quickly became the country's busiest seaport. Consequently, Penang began to suffer considerable brain drain as younger Penangites started emigrating for better employment opportunities.

Between 1974 and 1976, the George Town City Council was merged with the Penang Island Rural District Council to form the Penang Island Municipal Council, while the five local authorities within Seberang Perai, including the Butterworth and Bukit Mertajam town councils, were merged into the Seberang Perai Municipal Council. By then, local elections, suspended since 1965, became a thing of the past, with the municipal councillors being appointed by the Penang state government ever since. The merger of the local governments on Penang Island also led to a decades-long dispute over George Town's city status.

In the 1990 state election, Lim Chong Eu as the incumbent lost the Padang Kota constituency to Lim Kit Siang of the Democratic Action Party (DAP), forcing him into retirement. Although Barisan Nasional remained in power, Lim Chong Eu was succeeded by Koh Tsu Koon as the Chief Minister of Penang.

=== 1991–2008 ===
Koh Tsu Koon's tenure as the Chief Minister of Penang was marked by inept development and urban planning policies, rampant pollution, and the deteriorating general state of affairs within Penang. Political tussles complicated development policies, while simmering discontent from Penang's vocal non-governmental organisations (NGOs) and residents over the state's decline would eventually lead to an unprecedented political change within the state.

In the early 1990s, plans for the development of Penang Hill were drawn up by the Penang state government, drawing considerable backlash from Penang's civil societies over the potential environmental degradation of the forested hill. The plan was eventually axed. Meanwhile, the Rent Control Act, which until then had protected the low-income residents within the George Town city centre from eviction by preventing any arbitrary hike in rents, was repealed by 2001. This consequently led to the further hollowing out of the city centre, as residents, and smaller businesses, were unable to cope with the rental hikes and moved out. Unscrupulous private developers began demolishing several pre-war heritage buildings within the city centre for redevelopment, while other historic buildings fell under disrepair. Concerned over the impending loss of George Town's heritage architecture, NGOs based within the city started to mobilise public support for the conservation of these historic buildings.

By the early 2000s, Penang's economic growth began to lose steam, with the city-state recording the lowest monthly household income growth rate amongst the Malaysian states. The decades of brain drain also took its toll. For instance, while Kuala Lumpur was granted several mega-projects, including the Petronas Towers and the Kuala Lumpur International Airport, Penang suffered a shortage of qualified engineers and architects as professionals continued gravitating towards the Greater Kuala Lumpur area. Moreover, the lack of a coherent urban planning policy and poor traffic management meant that little was done to curb the worsening traffic congestion within Penang. Even the state's reputation for cleanliness was not spared, as reports of coastal pollution and dirty streets within Penang made headline news. As early as 1996, the then Malaysian Prime Mninister, Mahathir Mohamad, had even labelled Penang a "garbage state".

Widespread dissatisfaction over Penang's decline and neglect sparked a media campaign to restore Penang to its former glory in 2004. It has since been speculated that the public outcry over the neglect of the city once known as the Pearl of the Orient, combined with Penang's relatively lively political scene, contributed to the defeat of Barisan Nasional in the 2008 state election by the federal opposition pact, Pakatan Rakyat. The opposition coalition, led by the DAP, subsequently took over the Penang state government, with Lim Guan Eng succeeding Koh as the Chief Minister of Penang.

In late 2004, Penang was hit by the massive Indian Ocean tsunami. Out of the 68 deaths within Malaysia, 52 were in Penang. Northern coastal areas, such as Batu Ferringhi and Gurney Drive in George Town, were among the worst hit places within the state. In the aftermath of the tsunami, a network of sirens has been installed throughout Penang as part of a national tsunami warning system designed to alert the public of such calamities in the future.

=== 2008 ===
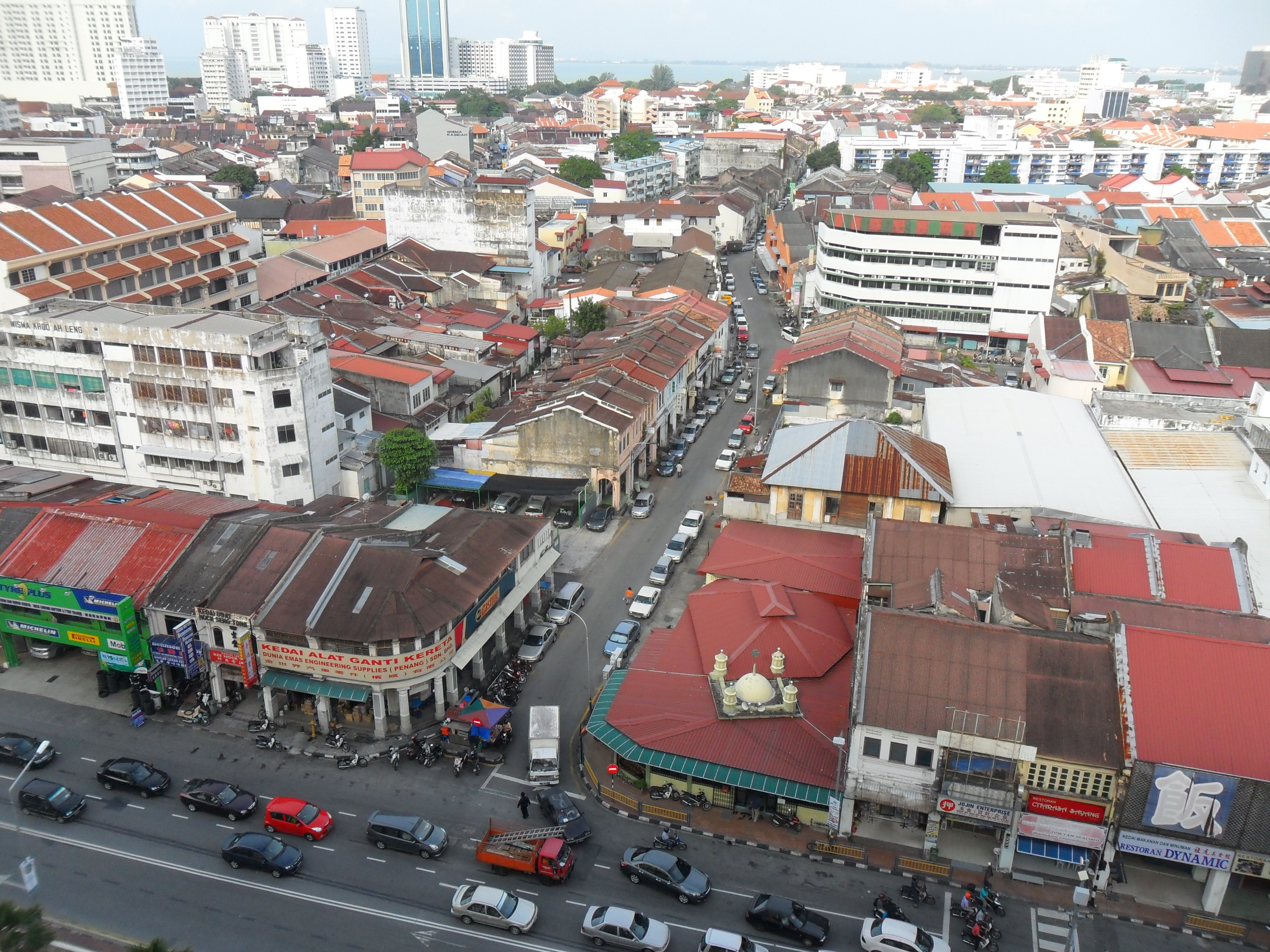
The historic city centre of George Town has been gazetted as a UNESCO World Heritage Site since 2008.

The swearing in of the new Penang state government, now led by Pakatan Rakyat, in 2008, heralded various positive policy changes. During that year, the George Town city centre, along with Malacca, was inscribed as a UNESCO World Heritage Site, as a result of years of conservation efforts led by the city's NGOs. The new state government subsequently spearheaded efforts to improve hygiene, cleanliness and pedestrianisation, as well as the use of public transportation and the promotion of the city's cultural diversity. By 2010, George Town was ranked the most liveable city in Malaysia by ECA International, coming in at eighth place within Asia as well. Moreover, in 2017, the city was also ranked the second cleanest within Malaysia, behind only Ipoh.

In the economic front, the present state government has emphasised efforts to attract foreign direct investments and to push Penang up the economic value chain, as well as policies to root out corruption. In 2010, Penang recorded the highest amount of capital investments within Malaysia, attracting RM12.2 billion, or 26%, of the nation's total investments. Penang's stunning economic recovery, particularly since 2008, was described by Bloomberg as Malaysia's "biggest economic success" despite the Malaysian federal government's focus on other states such as Johor and Sarawak. On top of that, the Penang state government was able to decrease Penang's public debt by 95%, from RM630 million in 2008 to RM30 million by late 2011. In addition, in 2016, George Town was rated as the most attractive destination for commercial property investment within Malaysia by Knight Frank, surpassing even Kuala Lumpur.

In 2015, the Malaysian federal government elevated the Penang Island Municipal Council into the present-day Penang Island City Council, thereby expanding the jurisdiction of George Town to encompass the entire Penang Island, as well as five of the surrounding islets. This also made George Town the only Malaysian city to have been conferred its city status twice.

The Second Penang Bridge, currently the longest bridge in Southeast Asia, was opened in 2013. Straddling a length of 24 km (15 mi), it provides a second road link between Penang Island and Seberang Perai, and has spurred the development of new industrial areas such as Batu Kawan.

== See also ==
- History of George Town
- Straits Settlements
- List of governors of Penang
