= Khoo Kongsi =

Leong San Tong Khoo Kongsi
- 龍山堂邱公司 (Chinese characters); Liông-san-tông Khu Kong-si (Hokkien POJ)
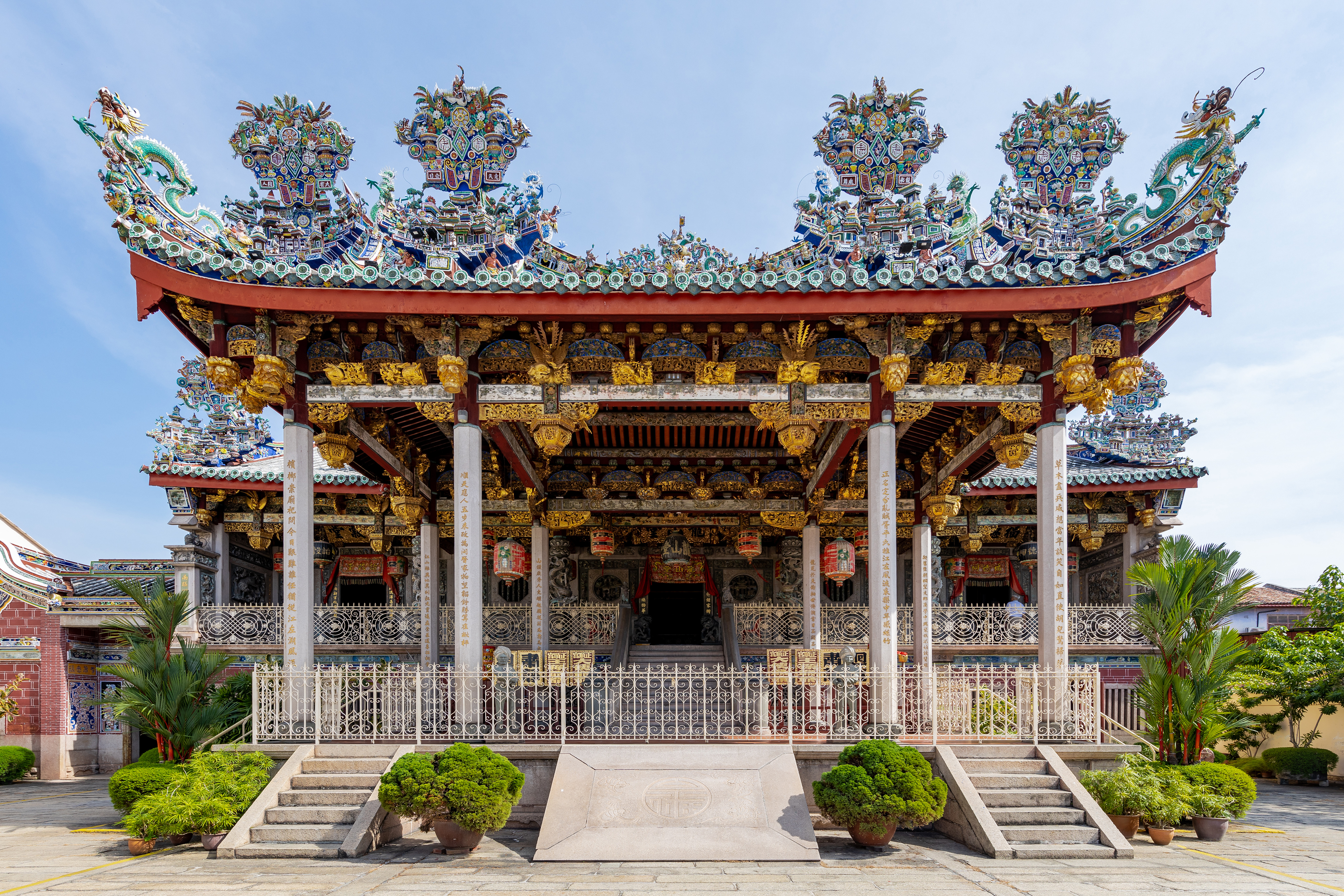

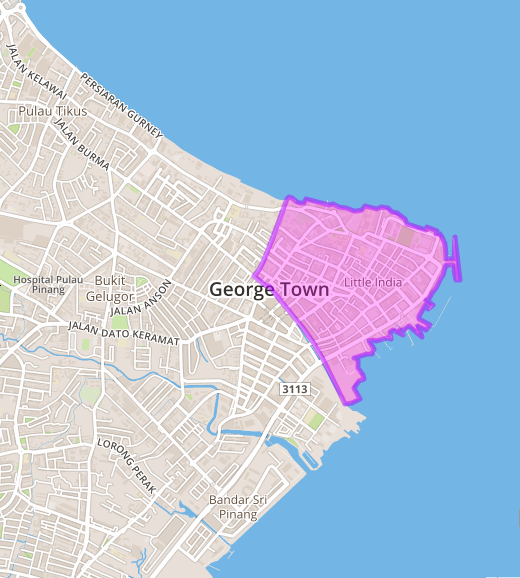
- Location within central George Town, Penang

General information
- Type: Hokkien clan temple
- Architectural style: Hokkien architecture
- Location: Cannon Square, 10200 George Town, Penang, Malaysia, George Town, Penang, Malaysia
- Coordinates: 5.415026°N 100.33712°E
- Current tenants: Khoo Kongsi
- Completed: 1906; 120 years ago
- Cost: $100,000
- Owner: Khoo Kongsi

UNESCO World Heritage Site
- Type: Cultural
- Criteria: ii, iii, iv
- Designated: 2008 (32nd session)
- Part of: George Town UNESCO Core Zone
- Reference no.: 1223
- Region: Asia-Pacific

The Leong San Tong Khoo Kongsi (Chinese: 龍山堂邱公司; Pe̍h-ōe-jī: Liông-san-tông Khu Kong-si), or Khoo Kongsi for short, is the largest Hokkien clanhouse in Malaysia, with elaborate and highly ornamented architecture, a mark of the dominant presence of the Chinese in Penang, Malaysia. The Khoo Kongsi is the grandest clan temple in the country. It is also one of the city's major historic attractions. The clan temple has retained its historic setting, which includes an association building, a traditional theatre, and the late 19th century rowhouses for clan members, all clustered around a granite-paved square. It is located in Cannon Square in the heart of the oldest part of the city of George Town, in the midst of narrow, winding lanes and pre-war houses.

== History ==
The Khoo Kongsi is a clan association of the Leong San Tong (Dragon Mountain Hall) clan, whose forefathers came from XinAn Village, Haicang District, Xiamen Municipal in Fujian province and were of Hoklo descent. The Khoos were among the wealthy Straits Chinese traders of 17th century Malacca and early Penang. In the 19th century, the clan complex resembled a miniature clan village, with its own self-government as well as educational, financial, welfare and social organisations. The clan temple was built in 1906 when the Khoo clan was at the height of wealth and eminence in Penang society.

The forefathers of the Khoo family who emigrated from South China built it as a clanhouse for members of the Khoo family in 1851. It was burnt down in 1901, allegedly struck by lightning, and the Chinese believed that it was due to its resemblance to the Emperor's palace, which provoked the gods. A scaled-down version was later built in 1902 and completed in 1906. Even so, the complex boasts a magnificent hall embellished with intricate carvings and richly ornamented beams of the finest wood bearing the mark of master craftsmen from China. The clan temple is dedicated to the clan's Patron Deities and also houses a collection of ancestral tablets. Chinese operas are still staged at the theatre during the seventh lunar month.

Like many such clan associations in South East Asia, Khoo Kongsi is no longer the center of important social activities and functions that it once held. Different strategies and ideas are being implemented to redefine the place of clan associations in the 21st century. Due to its location in the UNESCO World Heritage area of George Town, it is a popular attraction for tourists interested in local culture.

== Genealogy ==
The clan is often mistakenly thought to represent all Chinese people with the surname of Khoo. However the clan only represents those whose ancestral lineage originates from Sin Kang Seah, Sin Aun Village, Sam Toh District, Hai Teng County, Chiang Chew Prefecture, Fujian, China which is presently known as Sin Aun Village in Xing Lin District, Xing Lin Town, Amoy (Xiamen). The clan's progenitor is Khoo Chian Eng, the 4th son of his father Chan Cheong Kong, making him a descendant of Chan Yan Si of Oon Leong who lived during the Tang dynasty and a 14th generation descendant Chan Leong Kong, an advisor of one of the Emperors of the Song dynasty.

It is noted that Khoo Chian Eng moved to San Peng Ang in Tong Aun County (now Tong'an District) approximately 650 years ago during the Yuan Dynasty, where he married Saw See Cheng and where they had their son Buan Seng Kong. Buan Seng Kong, whose family had later moved to Teh Toon (later known as Sin Kang Village and most recently as Sin Aun Village) added the surname of Khoo during the early Ming dynasty. Buan Seng Kong (later known as Khoo Buan Seng) went on to have two sons, Tua Huat and Cheng Huat, whose descendants migrated over China, Taiwan, Malaysia, Indonesia, Thailand, the Philippines, Myanmar and some American and European countries.

In order to keep track of descendants the clan uses a genealogical chart which serves as a naming guide for each generation of clansmen, however this is not always followed, especially in modern times.

Genealogical naming chart of the Penang Khoo's (8th Generation to 45th Generation)

| Penang Hokkien pronunciation | Generation (8-20) | Generation (21- 33) | Penang Hokkien pronunciation | Generation (33- | Penang Hokkien pronunciation |
|---|---|---|---|---|---|
| Kay | 8th | 21st | Kay | 33rd | Chian |
| Phaik | 9th | 2nd | Boo | 34th | Chiew |
| Theng | 10th | 23rd | Teng | 35th | Saik |
| Hoon | 11th | 24th | Kah | 36th | Hock |
| Swee | 12th | 25th | Lay | 37th | Har |
| Jin | 13th | 26th | Sin | 38th | Ee |
| Boon | 14th | 27th | Kar | 39th | Boh |
| Huan | 15th | 28th | It | 40th | Choo |
| Kok | 16th | 29th | Kuan | 41st | Ean |
| Hua | 17th | 30th | Soo | 42nd | Ek |
| Tai | 18th | 31st | Sin | 43rd | Say |
| Heng | 19th | 32nd | Aing | 44th | Giap |
| Soo | 20th | 33rd | Chian | 45th | Giang |

== Clan structure ==
The clan follows a specific structure to more accurately determine its descendants and hence their relations to one another. This structure is known in Penang Hokkien as the See Tua Kak (Four Sectional Groups) and were formed by the 4th to 8th generations of the family to form a total of 13 pang which is the Penang Hokkien word for branch/branches.

See Tua Kak

1. Gim Pang, Chan Pang and Chen Pang
2. Mooi Pang, Soo Pang
3. Goh Pang, Thay Pang and Chneh Pang
4. Hai Teoh, Hai Jee, Hai Sar, Hai See & Hai Goh (These branches are often referred to as the Kai Kee Kak)

The Hai Kee Kak are the largest branch of the See Tua Kak These branches then went on to form their own smaller kongsi's namely the Boon San Tong Khoo Kongsi and Khoo Si Toon Keng Tong Khoo Kongsi.

== Gallery ==
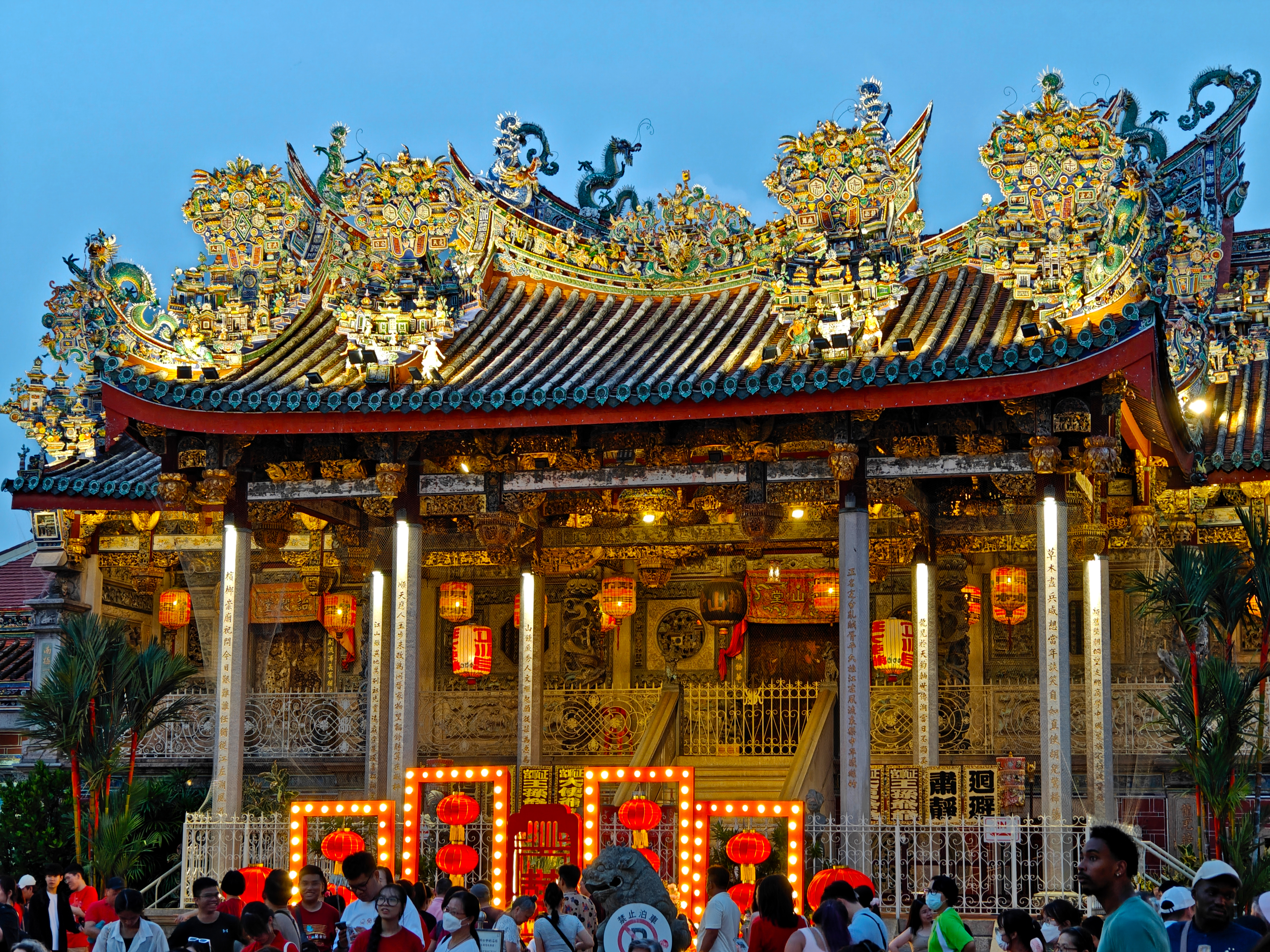
Khoo Kongsi illuminated for Chinese New Year celebrations in 2024

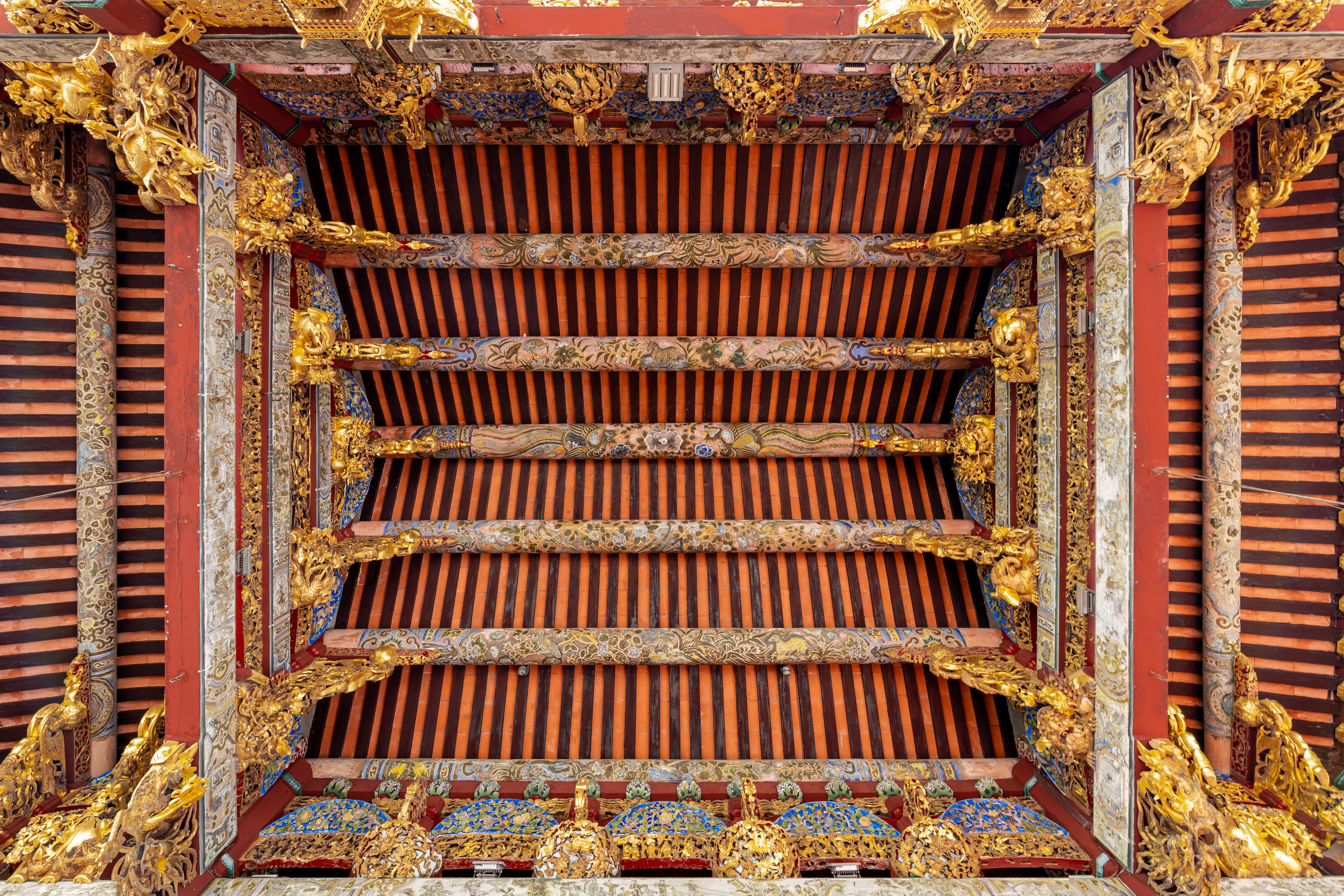
The Ceiling of the Khoo Kongsi

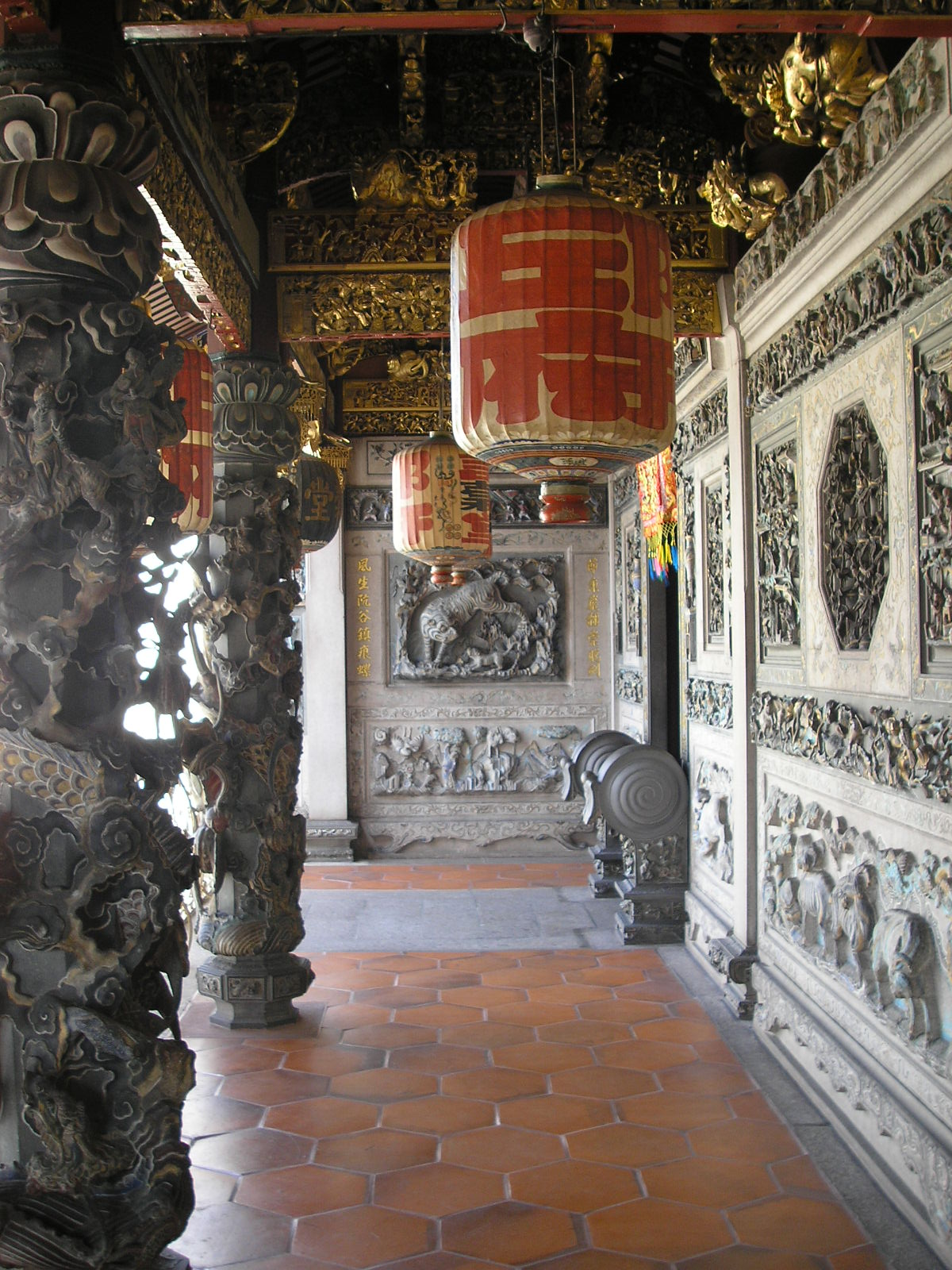
Hallway at the Khoo Kongsi

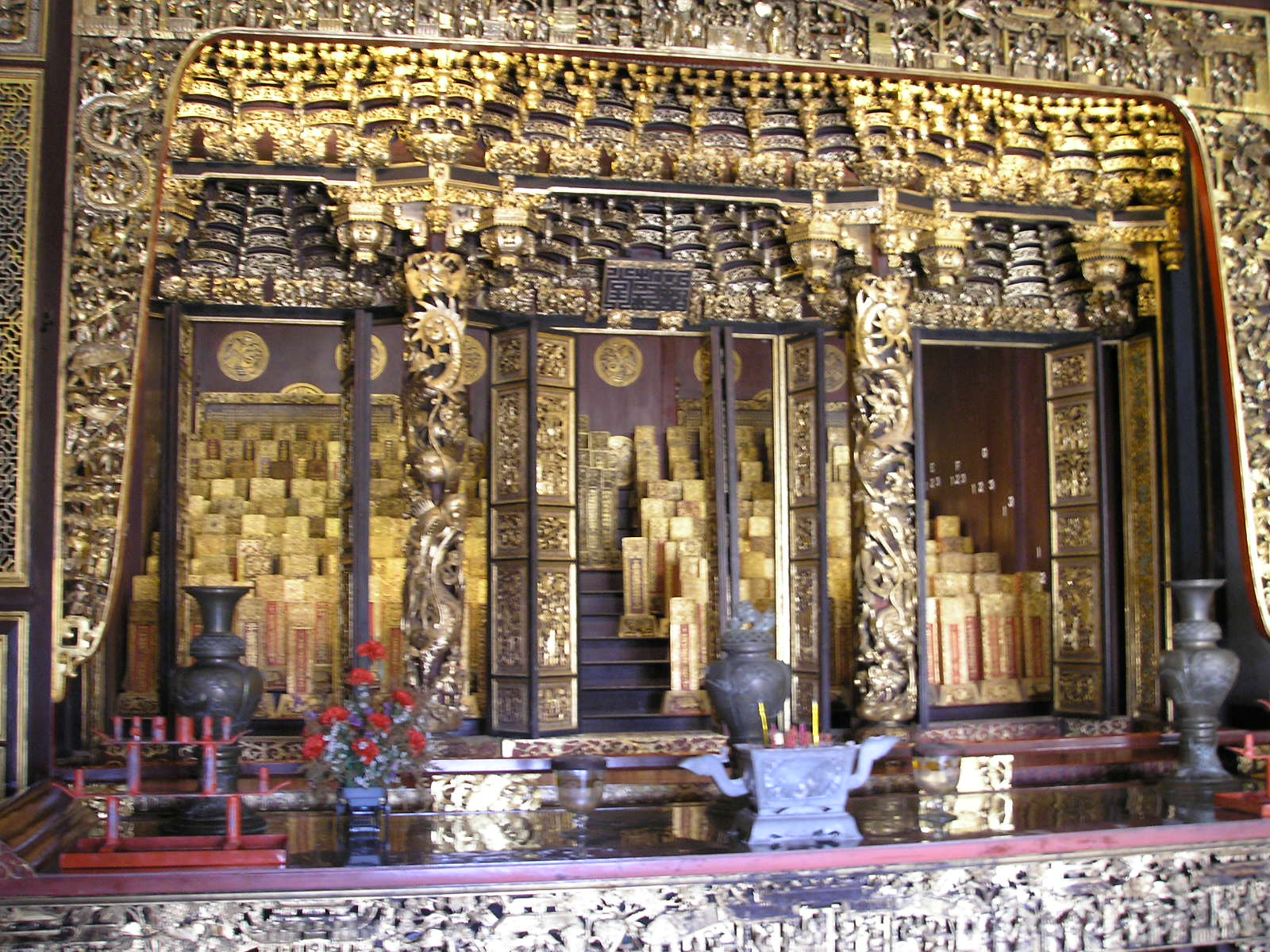
Altar with ancestral tablets

== Notable relatives ==
- Khoo Teow Pang (1790-1860): One of the early founders of Khian Tek Tong Society and the Hock Teik Cheng Sin Temple. He was descended from the Goh Pang branch of the family and was one of the ten family headmen in the first Board of Trustees of Khoo Kongsi.
- Khoo Thean Teik (1818-1860): One of Penang's most notorious and powerful Hokkien leaders in the 19th century and was involved in the Penang Riots of 1867. He was descended from the Hai Jee branch of the family.
