= Foo Tye Sin =

Foo Tye Sin JP
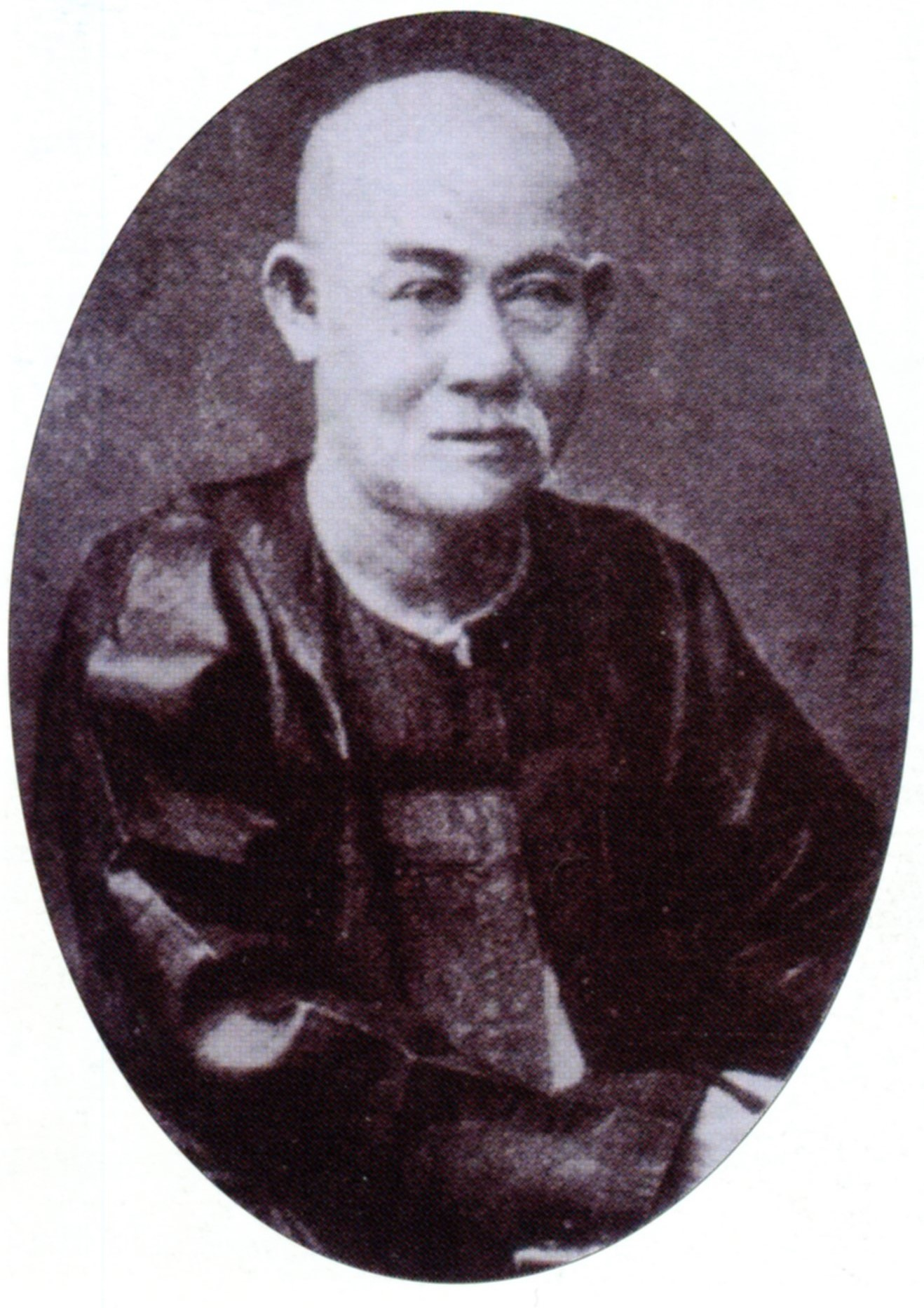
- Born: 1825; Bayan Lepas, Penang, British Malaya
- Died: November 2, 1888 (aged 62–63); Light Street, George Town, Penang, Straits Settlements
- Occupations: Businessman, tine miner, mediator
- Known for: Pepper King

Foo Tye Sin (simplified Chinese: 胡泰兴; traditional Chinese: 胡泰興; pinyin: Hú Tài Xìng) was a Justice of the Peace and an influential community leader of 19th century. Penang born Foo Tye Sin, a British subject, was a Hakka tin miner who could trace his ancestry to the Yong Ting District, Ting Chou Prefecture, Fujian. He was educated at St. Xavier's Institution and the Penang Free School. Tye Sin Street (四条路), or Lebuh Tye Sin as it is now known as, is named after him.

== Disturbances at Pinang and Larut ==
He was involved in events leading up to the signing of the Pangkor Treaty that would end the ten-year Larut Wars. His services were often called for in arbitration proceedings between the Hai San and Ghee Hin societies involved in the Larut Wars. Foo Tye Sin was one of three Chinese considered respectable enough to sit on the commission of inquiry into the 1867 Penang riots. He was the only non-partisan Chinese at a ceasefire conference called by Lt. Governor Anson at the height of the Larut war, even though he was, according to CS Wong, "...overtly and independent, but covertly a Hai San sympathiser." Foo Tye Sin and Ong Boon Teik were creditors of Ngah Ibrahim the Mantri of Larut. In early 1872, Foo Tye Sin and Ong Boon Teik sued Ngah Ibrahim.

== Tye Sin Tat and Co. ==
Foo Tye Sin and Koh Seang Tat, a descendant of Koh Lay Huan, the first Kapitan China of Penang, were business partners in the firm of Tye Sin Tat & Co., ships' chandlers, which was located at Beach Street. They were, together, two of the three Chinese Justices of the Peace in 1874."

== The Penang Khean Guan Insurance Company (1886) ==
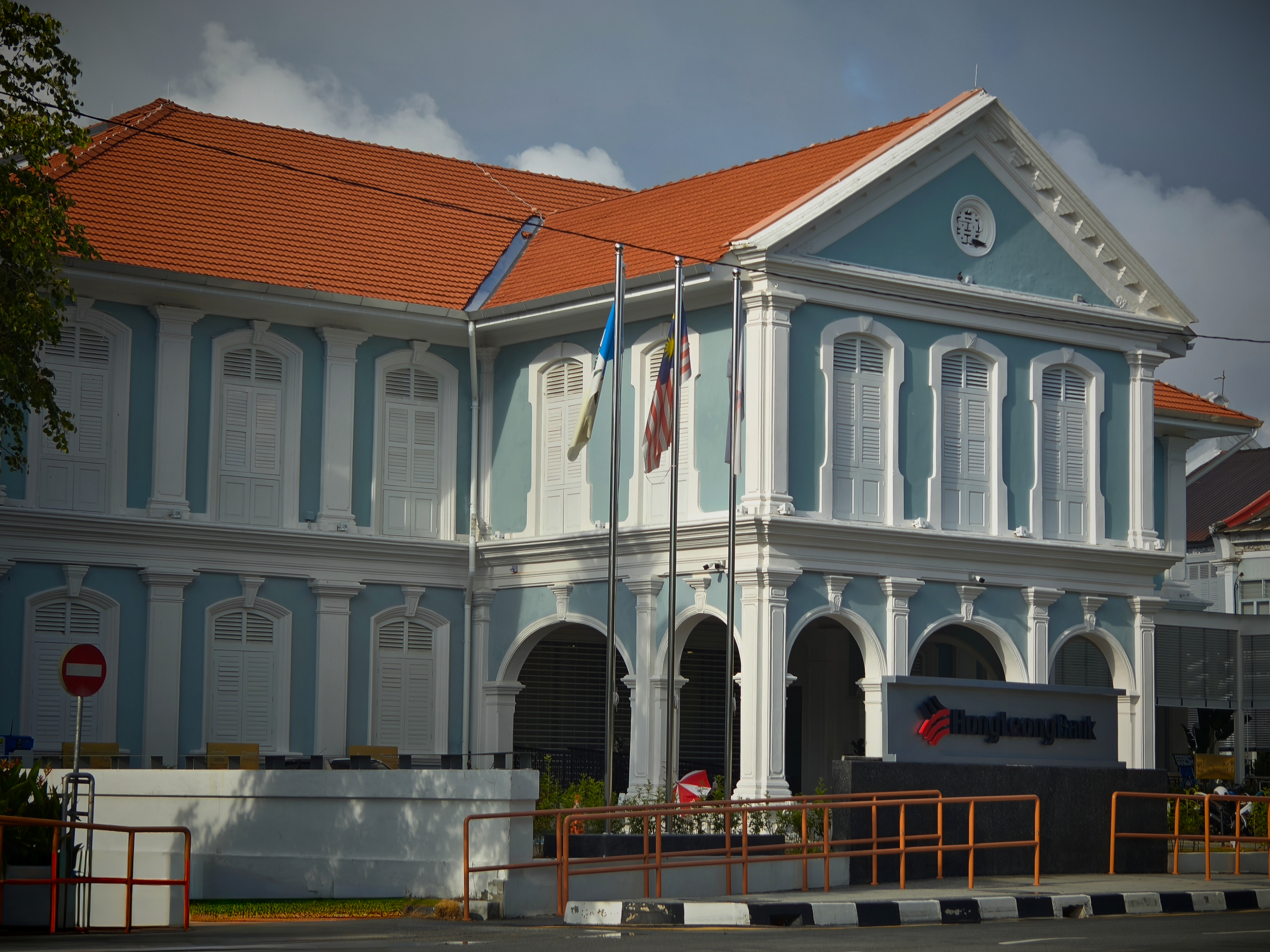
The Foo Tye Sin Mansion at Light Street in George Town

He was a founder and member of the board of directors of the Penang Khean Guan Insurance Company. The board was composed thus:

=== Name of Partners ===
- Tan Ley Kum (陈俪琴), Chairman
- Cheah Chean Eok (谢增煜), Secretary
- Lee Phee Yeow (李丕耀), Chong Moh & Co.
- Cheah Eu Ghee (谢有义), Chie Hin & Co.
- Khoo Thean Teik (邱天德), Chin Bee & Co.
- Khoo Sim Bee (邱心美), Ee Soon & Co.
- Cheah Tek Soon (谢德顺), Sin Eng Moh & Co.
- Ong Beng Tek (王明德), Ban Chin Hong & Co.
- Foo Tye Sin (胡泰兴)
- Yeoh Cheng Tek (杨清德), Hong Thye & Co.
- Khaw Sim Bee (许心美), Koe Guan & Co.
- Cheah Leng Hoon (谢凌云), Eng Ban Hong & Co.
- Gan Kim Swee (颜金水), Aing Joo & Co.
- Tan Lim Keng (陈锦庆), Kim Cheang & Co.
- Ong Boon Tek (王文德), Treasurer
- Logan & Ross: Solicitors

== Pitt Street Kong Hock Temple (1887) ==
Together with Khaw Boo Aun (also spelt Koh Boo Aun), Khoo Thean Teik and Cheah Tek Soon, He was made a trustee of the Pitt Street Kong Hock Temple in 1887, with the power to appoint and remove monks.

== Penang Po Leung Kuk (1889) ==
Along with Koh Seang Tat, Khaw Sim Bee, Ong Boon Teik and Ong Beng Teik, he was a founder of The Penang Po Leung Kuk (1889).
