= Khoo Thean Teik =

- 邱天德
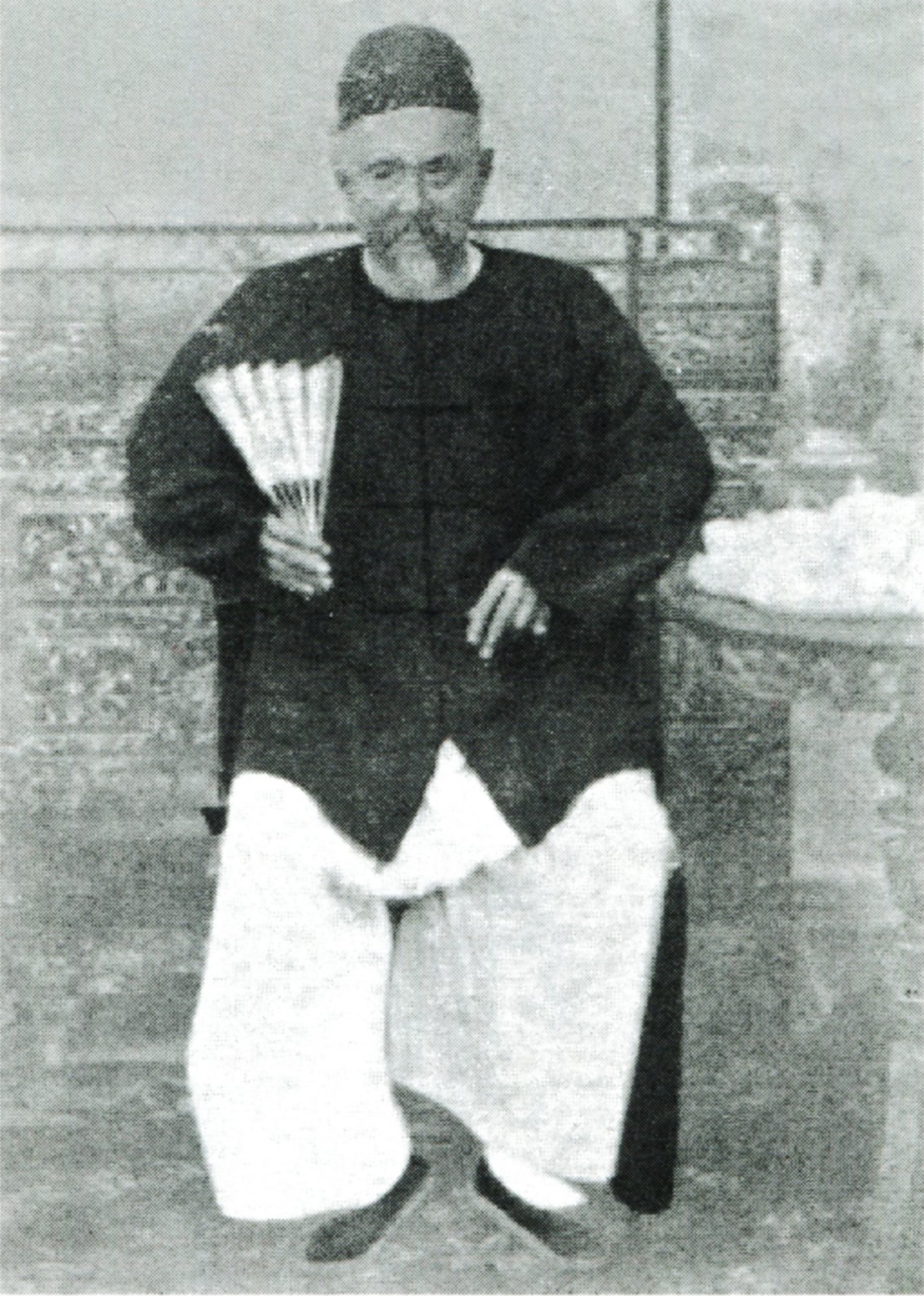
- Born: April, 1818; Penang
- Died: April 8, 1890 (aged 71–72); Beach Street, Penang, Straits Settlements
- Spouse(s): Chew Hong Neo, Ooi Lean Keow (黄娇娘)
- Children: 5 sons (including Khoo Hun Yeang) & 4 daughters
- Father: Khoo Guat Cheow

Khoo Thean Teik (Chinese: 邱天德; Pe̍h-ōe-jī: Khu Thian-tek; 1826–1891) was one of the most powerful and notorious Hokkien leaders of 19th-century Penang. His name, "Thean Teik", means "Heavenly Virtue". He was the leader of the Tokong or Khian Teik society that was involved in the Penang Riots of 1867 and through its connection with the Hai San, the internecine Larut Wars of 1861 to 1874. He traded through the companies Khoon Ho and Chin Bee. He was a towkay, trading in immigrant labour and had interests in the Opium Farms in Penang and Hong Kong. Thean Teik Estate, a residential neighbourhood in Penang, and Jalan Thean Teik are named after him.

== Chronology ==
- 1826: Born in Penang.
- 1851: Founding director of the Khoo Kongsi.
- 1858: First arrested for fighting. The Hokkien community goes on strike to get the government to release him.
- 1860 (circa): Takes over as Elder Brother of the Khian Teik secret society, at just 34 years of age.
- 1867: The Penang Riots. Gang war between Chinese Khian Teik and Ghee Hin societies and involving the Malay Red Flag and White Flag societies.
- 1868: Arrested for having planned and instigated the riots. Death sentence pronounced but unenforced by skeleton police force, and eventually commuted to life imprisonment.
- 1875: Released after seven years in prison.
- 1878: Founding director of Boon San Tong Khoo Kongsi for descendants of Hai Jee lineage, of which he was one. The Boon San Tong Khoo Kongsi is the subordinate pillar of the Leong San Tong Khoo Kongsi. Khoo Thean Teik made Boon San Tong the most powerful pillar of Leong San Tong.
- 1879: Principal donor to the Temple of the City God (Seng Ong Beow), in Jelutong, Penang, dedicated to the government of the Nether-world.
- 1881: Founding director of the Penang Chinese Town Hall.
- 1886: Major donor to the Batu Cantong and Batu Lanchang cemeteries.
- 1888: Major donor to the construction of the Thean Hock Keong Temple in Bagan Ajam, one of the oldest temples in Butterworth, Penang.
- 1889: Together with Chung Keng Quee, secured the monopoly for the Perak revenue farms (tobacco, liquor, opium, pawnbroking, and gambling). Donated a bell to the Snake Temple.
- 1890: Major donor to the Pulau Tikus Hokkien cemeteries.
- 1891: Died, one year after the abolition of secret societies in the Straits Settlements.

== Towkay, The Protector of Coolies ==
Khoo Thean Teik had the monopoly for indentured migrant workers from China. He was paid a thousand or more dollars a year by parties in Shantou to be a Khehtau or Towkay or Protector of Coolies.

== Chung Keng Quee and Khoo Thean Teik ==
Chung Keng Quee and Khoo Thean Teik were connected both politically and commercially, the politics of the day being commercially motivated in any case. Apart from the monopolies for tobacco, liquor, opium and gambling revenue farming in Perak that these two jointly obtained from Sir Hugh Low, British Resident at Perak in 1889, they were both heads of their respective secret societies which were allied against their common foe, the Ghee Hin. While Chung, Keng Quee was head of the Hai San his ally Khoo, Thean Teik was head of the Tua Pek Kong or Kien Tek Society. Chung, Keng Quee and Khoo Thean Teik together represented the allied Haisan-Khianteik group of Perak Hakkas and Penang Hockiens.

Both Chung and Khoo were in the business of procuring, supplying or employing coolies. Khoo Thean Teik aided by Koh, Seang Thye on one occasion supplied $60,000 in goods, money and ammunition to Chung, Keng Quee and Tan, Yit Hoon for their mining activities and for their military activities against the Ghee Hin in return for seven-tenths of the percentage of the tin they produced.

== See also ==
- Chinese Protectorate
- Chinese clan association
- Chinese migration
- Edward Anson
- Foo Tye Sin
- Governor of Penang
- History of Penang
- Hui (secret society)
- Malaysian Chinese
- Second Larut War
- Tiandihui
- Tong (organisation)
- Triad (underground societies)
- wikisource:Chinese Secret Societies By Frederick Boyle

== Court Cases ==
- Khoo Hooi Leong v Khoo Chong Yeok, [1930] AC 346, Privy Council: Blanesburgh, Warrington, Russell.
- Re Khoo Thean Tek's Settlements. [1929] S.S.L.R. 50. 5.
- "The houses belonged to Hassan Kudus and Chew Hock Seng the judgment-debtors, but had been mortgaged by them to one Khoo Thean Tek since deceased, ..."
