= 1867 Penang riots =

1867 riots in Malaysia

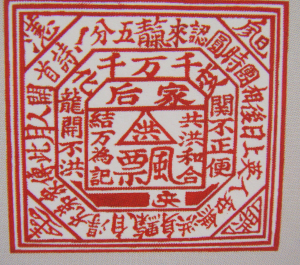
A membership certificate of the Ghee Hin, one of the factions involved in the Penang riots of 1867.

The 1867 Penang riots occurred on Penang Island, Malaysia, between 3 August and 12 August 1867 when it was a British Crown colony. They began as a result of rising tensions between two Chinese secret societies, the Gee Hin and the Toh Peh Kong, who were traditional enemies and were triggered by an incident involving the throwing of a rambutan skin at a member of the Toh Peh Kong by a Gee Hin member whilst calling him a thief, and became known as "the rambutan skin riots". Later, hundreds of members of each side took to the streets and fought pitched battles, many armed with muskets, and there was widespread arson directed particularly against homes and business of rival members.

The British authorities were unable to restore order due to the ineffectiveness of its small police force and the absence of the island's garrison which had been temporarily assigned elsewhere. The riots ended after ten days when the troops returned and reinforcements arrived from Singapore on the same day. Each faction was required to pay a fine to the British authorities. The number of those killed is unknown but has been estimated at over 100. Following the riots an "Ordinance for the Suppression of Dangerous Societies" was introduced which eventually led to the banning of the Chinese secret societies.

== Causes ==
Before the riots broke out in Penang on 3 August 1867, hostilities between two rival Chinese secret societies on the island – the Gee Hin of about 20,000 members, and the Toh Peh Kong of about 9,000 members – had been growing and had escalated to frequent fighting between their respective members culminating in the murder of a Malay diamond merchant who was a member of one of the societies.

Traditional animosities which existed among different peoples in China based on language and location continued in Penang and this was particularly the case between Cantonese and Hokkien immigrants. Cantonese men mainly joined the Gee Hin and those from the Hokkien province living in Penang mainly joined the Toh Peh Kong.

The Gee Hin had a strong presence in Penang and were associated with the White Flag faction made up mainly of Malays. The Toh Peh Kong, established in Penang in the 1840s, were associated with the Red Flag Malay faction, and were led by Khoo Thean Teik at the time of the riots.

Members of the Chinese secret societies were bound by strict rules of conduct which created strong bonds between its members. Initiates were subject to blood and oath giving rituals and a code of silence. Each member was bound to defend the society and to help fellow members which swelled the ranks of the rioters.

== The riot ==
In July 1867, the first serious disorder occurred sparked by a minor incident in which a member of the Toh Peh Kong, whilst peering into the premises of a White Flag Malay affiliated to the Gee Hin, was accused of being a thief and had a rambutan skin thrown at him. He later returned with ten to twelve members of the Toh Peh Kong and fighting broke out between respective members armed with clubs and stones. The Toh Peh Kong retreated to their clan house which was stoned by the Gee Hin pursuers. The fighting then escalated when a large group of Toh Peh Kong appeared carrying firearms. Police arrived and were successful in stopping the fighting.

However, during the following days violence continued with killings and assaults on individuals carried out by both sides and at the start of August the violence became more organised. On 1 August a chief of the Toh Peh Kong made accusations against the Gee Hin and the White Flags that some members had stolen newly dyed cloth which had been hanging outside the premises of a dyer who was a member of the Toh Peh Kong. The accusations were false and according to Lieutenant-Governor of Penang, Archibald Anson in his account of the riots: "There is no doubt that this charge was made to bring about a casus belli, for which the headman had made every preparation".

On 3 August, the Toh Peh Kong made a number of coordinated attacks against the Gee Hin and "the great Penang riot", as it was called by Anson, began which lasted ten days. Armed with muskets they set fire to homes occupied by members of the Gee Hin in the capital, George Town and in the countryside which led to the destruction of the village of Jellutong, and roamed the streets shooting at their rivals, at one point firing several canon mounted on the roofs of buildings. European women and children fled their homes and took refuge in Fort Cornwallis or Light Street Convent and saw decapitated Chinese men lying in the road.

Pitt Street and Beach Street in the commercial centre of the town saw the heaviest fighting with men from both sides armed with muskets, spears and knives with the Gee Hin suffering the highest casualties. Houses were set on fire and some occupiers died whilst fire-engines, guarded by special constables, attempted in vain to extinguish the flames. Residents fled to the countryside in panic and shopkeepers tried to move their goods to safe places. All commercial activity and government business was suspended.

== Reaction of the British authorities ==
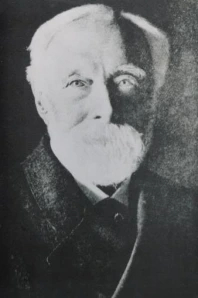
Archibald Anson, Lieutenant-Governor of Penang during the riots of 1867.

The British authorities were virtually powerless to act. The small police force was initially overwhelmed and Lieutenant-Governor Anson lacked the experience needed to deal with the riot admitting in his account that he was nervous and hesitant, and unsure of what to do. Having recently arrived in his post in June he said he was not sufficiently acquainted with the society and customs of the local people to know the correct course of action, and had no one to turn to for advice.

He was also unlucky because most of the military personnel who were stationed on the island, and could have quickly ended the rioting, were away. The Madras Sepoy Regiment had recently been sent on a mission to the Nicobar Islands with two men-of war – the Wasp and the Satellite – to rescue a widow of a ship's captain who had been imprisoned by a local chief. In addition, a battery of artillery had left for Rangoon and no relief force had arrived.

In response Anson toured the town and ordered the erection of cheval de frise and makeshift barricades manned by armed police to try to separate the factions. Many Europeans volunteered to join and were quickly enrolled as special constables and provided with firearms. Some were sent to guard important government buildings including the civil powder magazine which was rumoured to be an objective of the rioters. A six-pounder gun was set up in Market Street and fired canister shot into the mob which temporarily dispersed the crowd. Those manning the barricades were fired on by the rioters and a havildar was wounded and later died in hospital.

Many junks from the northern Malay states and Junk Ceylon began arriving carrying supporters of the Gee Hin faction. The government steamer Rainbow was sent to patrol the harbour to try to apprehend the boats and bring them to the fort where the crews could be detained but there were too many and they escaped into the town.

== End of the riot ==
On the tenth day of the rioting the two men-of-war returned from the Nicobar Islands carrying the two companies of sepoys and a detachment of armed police. On the same day his superior, Harry Ord, governor of the Straits Settlements, following an emergency meeting of the Legislative Council, arrived from Singapore with a group of sepoys from the garrison aboard the Rifleman in response to a message from Anson which had been dispatched on 11 August. Seeing the arrival of the government troops in the harbour and after appeals for peace to the leaders by Anson, the two factions agreed to halt the street fighting and arson with Anson demanding from each faction a "voluntary penalty" of 5,000 Straits Dollars, equivalent to £1,060 according to Anson, (£20,000 today). The number of those who died in the riots is unknown although estimates put the number at over 100, whilst the damage was estimated at $100,000.

== Aftermath ==
In response to the riots the police force was expanded and more police stations were built in George Town. A number of the rioters were tried in the Penang courts in September and six were transported for 21 years. Four others were convicted of murder and sentenced to death which was later commuted to imprisonment.

A government enquiry was established and various measures were introduced to try to rein in the Chinese secret societies including the Suppression of Dangerous Societies Ordinance of 1869 which eventually led to the outlawing of the organisations.
