= Second Larut War =

The Second Larut War took place in 1865 and was sparked off by a gambling quarrel in June of that year between members of the two opposing secret societies.

According to Parkinson, in his book British Intervention in Malaya 1867-1877, the "Hysan or Tokong" leader in Penang was "Chan Keng Kwi", with "Lew Ah Sam" as leader in Larut.

== 16 June 1865 ==
In a gambling house in Klian Pauh, a quarrel between a Fui Chew Hakka and a Chung Shan Hakka. In Perak the Fui Chew Hakka were members of the Ghee Hin society and likewise the Chung Shan Hakka there were members of the Hai San Society. The disturbance escalated when 1,000 armed Chung Shan Hakka men turned up and attacked the Fui Chew taking 14 Fui Chew men prisoner.

At once there arose the party cry, "kill, kill these interlopers." and fourteen unhappy wretches were seized and locked up for the night in the lodge of the Han San Society.

The Malay Clerk (Kerani) and police did not interfere. Loh Chong and Lim Seng, both Hockiens from Penang who were merchants trading in Larut attempted to find a peaceful settlement. They went to the village and approached Chong Chong the head of the Fui Chew Hakka, asking him to restrain his men till a peaceful settlement could be achieved. Chong Chong agreed and asked Loh Chong to get Lau Sam, head of the Chung Shan Hakka at Larut, to apply to the Raja for 200 Malays to keep the peace. The two merchants approached Lau Sam at Klian Pauh who, having agreed to this course of action, requested the Jemadar (the ranking police officer) at the Balai (police station) to send a Malay guard to keep the peace till negotiations could be effected.

Judge and Magistrate Abdul Jabbar shortly arrived at the Balai with 200 armed Malays. About 20 to 30 of these were then sent to Klian Bahru with Abdul Jabbar's proclamation that no Fui Chew be allowed to leave and that no one be allowed to take them any provisions. In the afternoon some Hockien men went to negotiate a settlement to the quarrel. They arrived back at about 9pm with news that a settlement was agreed and that an agreement would be drawn up at 8am the following day.

== 17 June 1865 ==
At about midnight the Chung Shan took out their 14 Fui Chew prisoners, thrust sharpened bamboo into the necks of each, painted their flags with the blood and executed all but one of their prisoners who managed to escape to Klian Bahru.

At this alarm danger, the Hwuy (Fui) Chew men tried to escape. Unfortunately fourteen of them were caught, tied up and kept in Hai San lodge all night. The next morning they were brought out of torture. A sharpened bamboo was thrust into each victim's neck and when the oozing blood dripped out at the other end of the bamboo, it was used to dye the Hai San flag. All these victims perished, except one who escaped to tell the tale of horror to his people at Klian Bharu.

In the early morning of 17 June 1865 about 300 to 400 armed Fui Chew Hakka from Klian Bahru arrived at Klian Pauh and attacked the Chung Shan. Once again those Chinese not a party to dispute i.e. the Hockiens attempted to affect peaceful settlement.

== 19 June 1865 ==
Loh Chong and his party negotiated with the Fui Chew and proposed that they pay a fine of $1,000 to the Chung Sang Hakka and while this was ultimately agreed it left a bitter taste in the mouths of the Fui Chew who had already lost many of their people in the fighting that took place. Loh Chong left at about noon that day but shortly after his departure another fight broke out between the two sides. Abdul Jabbar with 200 armed Malays and a large gun attempted to disperse the parties concerned and eventually opened fire.

== 20 June 1865 ==
The Fui Chews then retired to Klian Bahru. Under the direction of Ngah Lamat and Kulop Mat Ali, two groups then set out in pursuit of the Fui Chew Hakka, one party of Malays led by Penghulu Sunu and another group of Malays accompanying the Chung Shan Hakka. By noon 20 June 1865 the Fui Chew were utterly defeated.

The Governor or Muntree of Laroot did not attempt to arrange this quarrel and instead of doing so joined the victorious Congsee Tan Siang (Go Kuan - Five Districts). This having been effected they both attacked the beaten Congsee and after killing 700 of their number drove that Congsee from their houses and mines and ultimately from the country.

== How It Ended ==
Their houses of the Fui Chew Hakka were destroyed completely. Their provisions seized. Their tin taken to the Balai and most of the ore taken to Chung Keng Quee's smelting house. So Ah Chiang, leader of the Ghee Hin was captured by Ngah Ibrahim at Teluk Kertang (Port Weld) and executed.

It was at this stage that Chin Ah Yam made his appearances with a gallant gesture. He approach Mantri and interceded for the prisoners, disclosing about a decade later that he was even prepared to offer his life in exchange for So Ah Chiang's (Cheong). As the Mantri was adamant, Ah Chiang and two men were executed the next day at Telok Kertang (the second stockade). When Chin Ah Yam heard that Ah Chiang's wife and child and other women (wife of Chew Sui Pow who was executed) were to be sent out of Larut, he again showed chivalry by warning the Mantri that if the women were removed, all the Chinese in the district would revolt.

The battle continued back and forth and spread to Province Wellesley and the island of Penang and other secret societies joined the fray. Both sides, exhausted, finally came to terms. An official inquiry took place and both the Hai San and Ghee Hin societies were fined $5,000 each for violating the peace of Penang and their leaders, banished.

By around 1870 there were a combined total of about 40,000 Hakka and Cantonese mine workers in the Larut district and the mining areas between the two groups were near to each other. It is this proximity that might explain how the next battle began.

== Notes ==
=== Sources ===
The Western Malay States 1850-1873: The Effects of Commercial Development on Malay Politics. By KHOO Kay-Kim, Published 1972 by Oxford University Press, Malaysia
