= Chateau Changyu–Moser XV =

Winery and vineyard estate in China

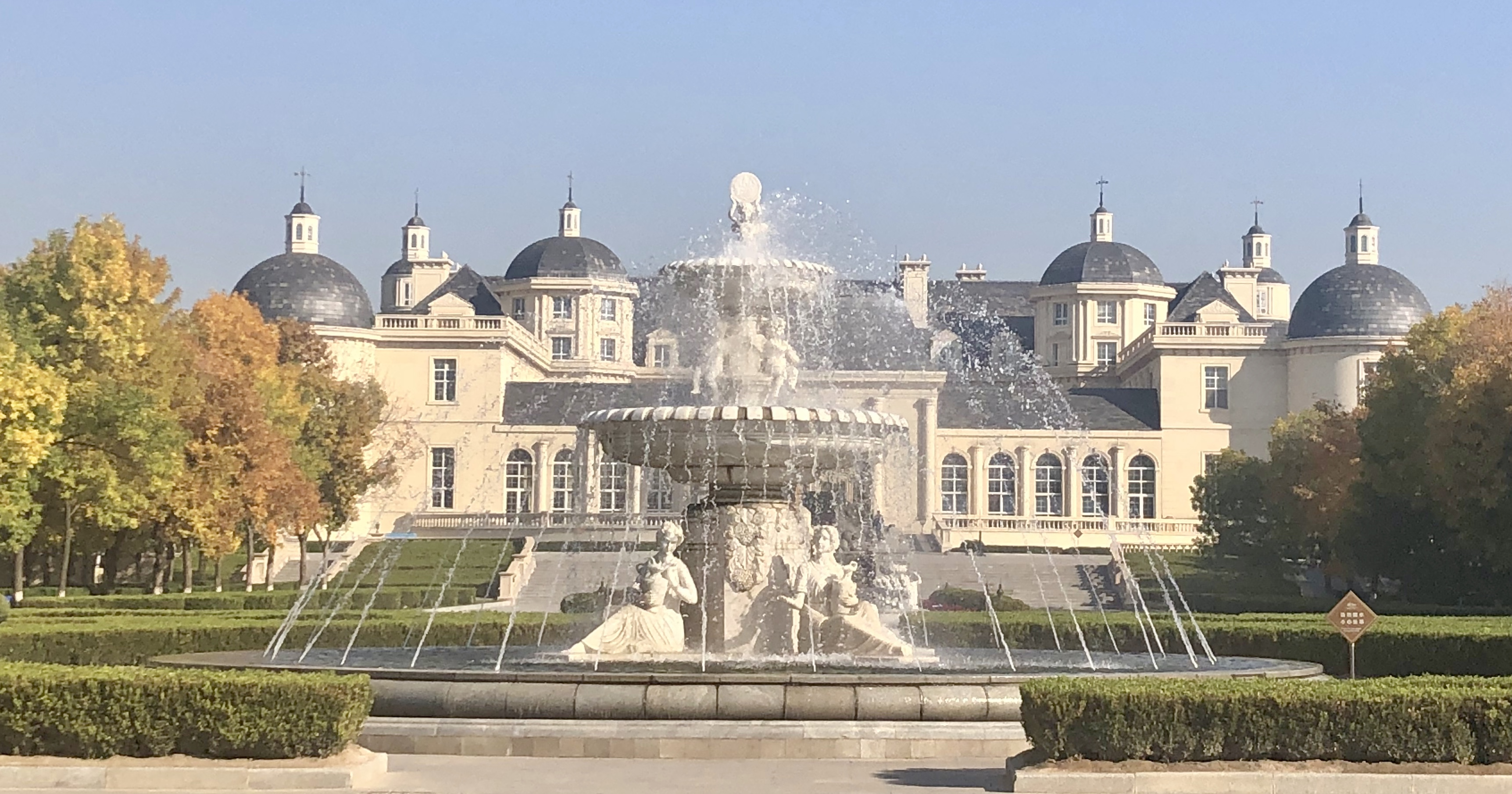
Château Changyu-Moser XV winery estate in Ningxia, China

Château Changyu–Moser XV (Chinese: 张裕摩塞尔十五世酒庄) is a winery and vineyard estate near Yinchuan, in the Ningxia wine region in Northwest China. Chateau Changyu–Moser XV is also the name of the wine produced by this estate. Opened in August 2013, Chateau Changyu-Moser is part of Changyu, China's oldest and largest wine brand founded in 1892 by Zhang Bishi.

Chateau Changyu Moser XV is a joint venture between Changyu Pioneer Company and winemaker and consultant Chief Winemaker Laurenz Maria Moser V (Lenz M.Moser) of Austrian winery Laurenz V. The estate is named after Moser who is 5th generation of the Austrian winemaking Moser Family and 15th generation direct lineage to Moser Family.

The estate is recognised by leading wine professionals and academics as one of China's superior producers.

== Winery architecture ==
The Chateau is built in a Bordelais style, complete with moat and fountains. The western inspired architectural style is a nod to western winemaking expertise, traditions and culture, dubbed the 'chateau movement'.

== Viticulture ==
The main varieties include Cabernet Sauvignon, Merlot and Syrah. The vines are on average 15 years old. The estate currently has 60 hectares planted with Cabernet Sauvignon with a further 200 hectares of vines in the area close to the estate. Every stage of wine production takes place at the château and the estate: viticulture, pressing, fermentation, maturation in the barrique cellar and bottling.

== Wines ==
The estate makes a core range of four wines all made from Cabernet Sauvignon: Helan Mountain red and white (a blanc de noir from free run juice of thick skinned cabernet sauvignon berries), Moser Family Cabernet Sauvignon and a premium level Grand Vin Cabernet Sauvignon.

In January 2020, the winery released the world's first and only Cabernet Sauvignon Blanc de Noir aged in French barriques. Made at the estate in North West China, from the free-run juice of small thick-skinned Ningxia Cabernet Sauvignon berries, and refined in French oak for twelve months, this new wine is a natural progression from the estate's unoaked white Cabernet Sauvignon (which Moser launched in 2017, as an innovative solution to the lack of suitable white varieties in the region).

In March 2020, the estate released Purple Air Comes from the East, an ultra-premium 100% estate-grown Cabernet Sauvignon from the chateau's vineyards. A limited production of 6,300 bottles of the 2016 vintage were made. The wine has been rated 16.5 points on Jancis Robinson MW's site (July 2020).

== Wine tourism ==
The chateau hosts a visitor centre with a museum illustrating the history of Chinese winemaking and the history of Changyu from its foundation in 1892 by Zhang Bishi.

== International market ==
Since the opening of the winery in 2013, the Château has built a European network of importers. The main thrust has been towards the UK, via distribution partners Bibendum PLB Group.

== See also ==
- Ningxia wines
