= Kek Lok Si =

Buddhist temple in George Town, Penang, Malaysia

- Malay: Kuil Kek Lok Si; Chinese: 極樂寺
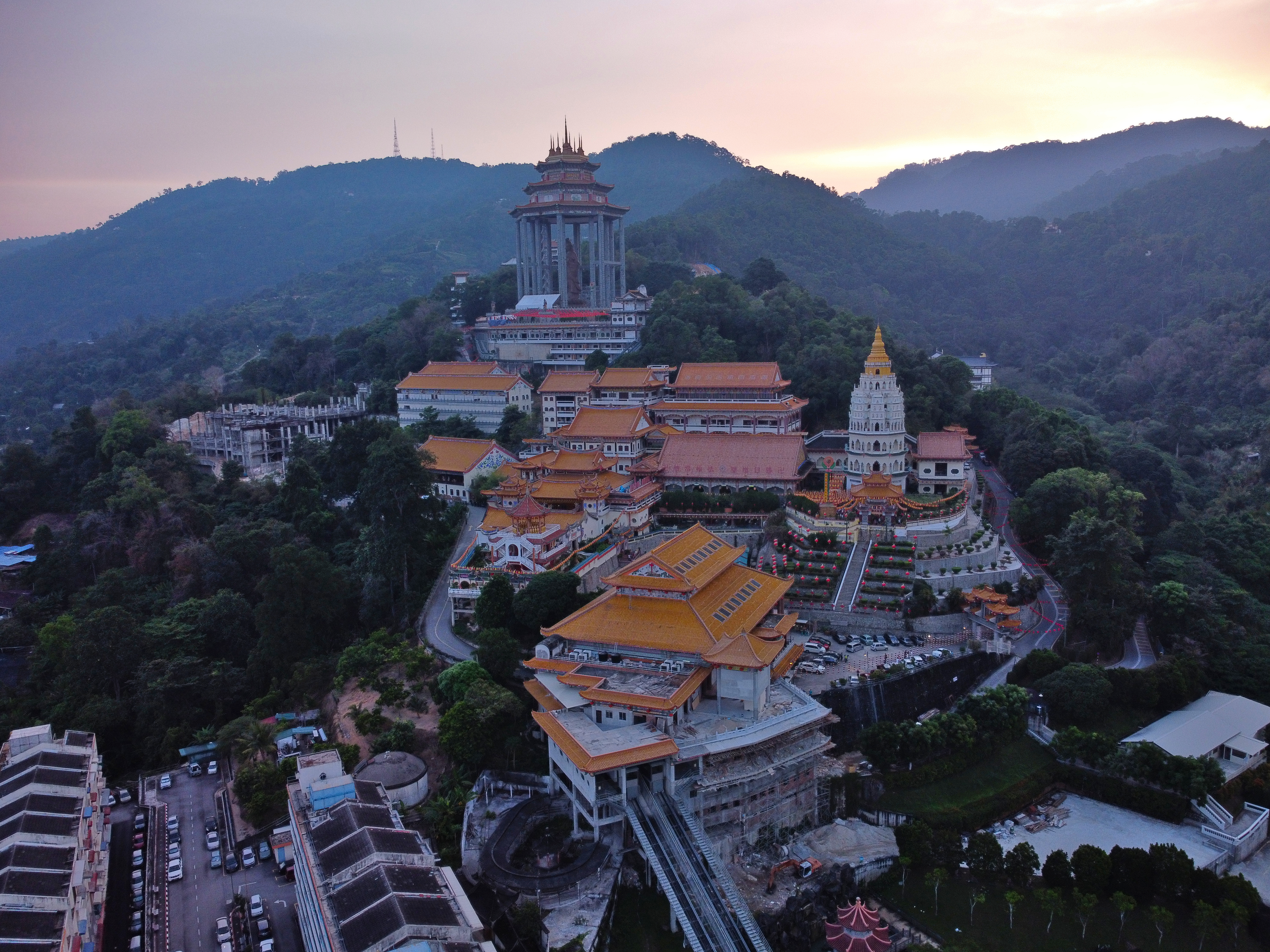

- Location within George Town

Religion
- Affiliation: Buddhism
- Status: Active

Location
- Location: Ayer Itam
- Municipality: George Town
- State: Penang
- Country: Malaysia
- Interactive map of Kek Lok Si
- Coordinates: 5°23′58.29″N 100°16′25.43″E

Architecture
- Type: Chinese; Thai; Burmese
- Founder: Beow Lean
- Completed: 1891; 135 years ago

Website
- kekloksitemple.com

Kek Lok Si
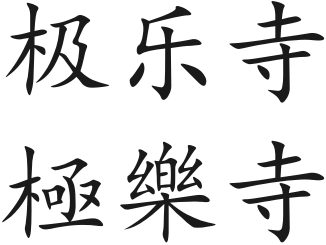
- Kek Lok Si in Simplified Chinese (top) and Traditional Chinese (below) character
- Traditional Chinese: 極樂寺
- Simplified Chinese: 极乐寺
- Hokkien POJ: Ke̍k-lo̍k-sī, Ke̍͘h-lo̍k-sī
- Literal meaning: "Temple of Ultimate Happiness"
Transcriptions
Standard Mandarin
- Hanyu Pinyin: Jílè Sì
- IPA: [tɕǐ lɤ̂ sɨ́]
Southern Min
- Hokkien POJ: Ke̍k-lo̍k-sī, Ke̍͘h-lo̍k-sī

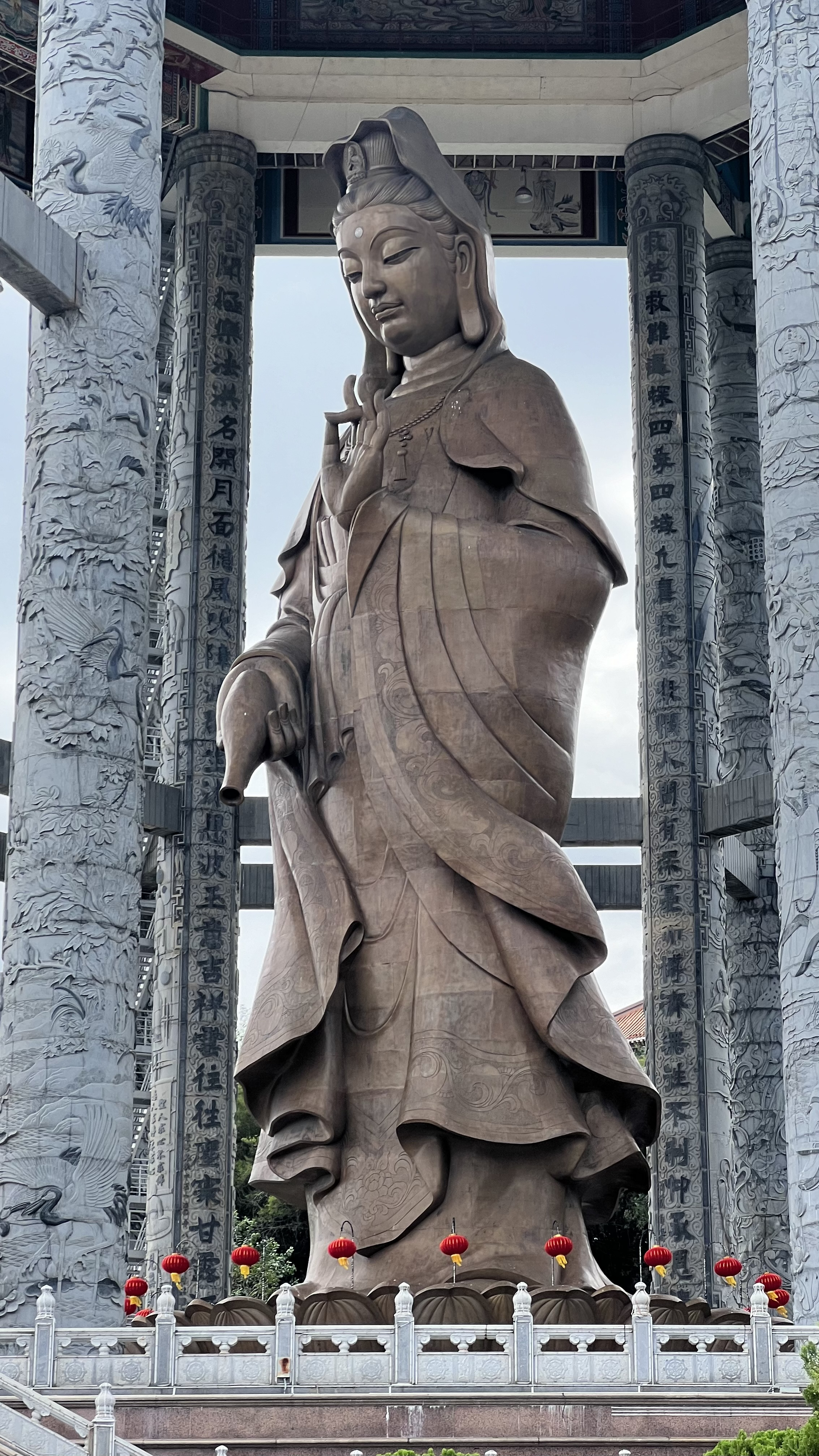
Guanyin statue with pavilion in 2024

The Kek Lok Si Temple (simplified Chinese: 极乐寺; traditional Chinese: 極樂寺) is a Buddhist temple in George Town in the Malaysian state of Penang. Located at Ayer Itam, it is the largest Buddhist temple in Malaysia and an important pilgrimage centre for Buddhists from Hong Kong, the Philippines, Singapore and other parts of Southeast Asia. The entire complex of temples was built over a period from 1890 to 1930, an inspirational initiative of Beow Lean, the abbot. The main feature of the complex is the seven-story Ten Thousand Buddhas Pagoda commissioned by the late Thai king Rama VI, featuring 10,000 alabaster and bronze statues of Buddha and the 36.57-metre-tall (120 ft) bronze statue of Guanyin (Kuan Yin), the Goddess of Mercy. The 10,000 Buddhas concept belongs to the Chinese Mahāyāna school of Buddhism while Rama VI was king over a Theravāda country and Buddhist tradition.

Mahayana Buddhism, Theravada Buddhism, and traditional Chinese rituals blend into a harmonious whole, both in the temple architecture and artwork as well as in the daily activities of worshippers.

== Etymology ==
Kek Lok Si means "Sukhāvatī temple". In Hokkien, kek-lok literally means "supreme joy", itself a translation of the Sanskrit Sukhāvatī, a Pure Land. si means "temple".

Kek Lok Si has also been translated as "heavenly temple", "Pure Land Temple", "temple of supreme bliss", and "temple of paradise".

== History ==
The construction of the temple began in 1890 and was completed in 1905. It was inspired by Beow Lean, the chief Chan Buddhist monk of the Goddess of Mercy Temple at Pitt Street in 1887; he had served earlier in the Kushan Abbey in Fujian in China. The site chosen by Beow, a spiritual location in the hills of Ayer Itam, facing the sea, was named "Crane Mountain". It was established as a branch of the Buddhist Vatican in Drum Mountain in Fuzhou, Fujian Province. Beow Lean was the first abbot of the temple. The buildings of the temple complex were sponsored by five leading Chinese business people of Penang known as "Hakka tycoons": Cheong Fatt Tze, his cousin Chang Yu Nan, Cheah Choon Seng, Tye Kee Yoon, and Chung Keng Kooi. Collection of funds for building the temple was also facilitated by dedicating the structures and artefacts in the name of the temple's benefactors. The main hall, which was completed first, housed a shrine to Guanyin, in a recessed area where many other female goddesses called the Queen of Heaven, the Goddess of the Earth, and Goddess of Childbirth are housed; which is said to represent, on a miniature scale, the island of Potalaka (as Mount Putuo), where there is a large shrine dedicated to Guanyin in the China Sea. People compared this shrine to the Amitabha Buddha's Western Paradise and started calling it the "Kek Lok Si" (Jile Si in Mandarin). There are also many other shrine chambers, which have stately statues, all gilded, of the Buddhas, Bodhisattvas, saintly Lohans, guardian spirits, and Heavenly (or Diamond) Kings of Pure Land Buddhism.

The consular representative of China in Penang reported the grandeur of the temple to the Qing imperial government. Following this, the Guangxu Emperor invited Beow Lean to Beijing in 1904 and bestowed on him 70,000 volumes (or 7,000, according to other sources) of the "psalms and other sacred works of Buddhism" and also presented him edicts anointing him the "dignity of the Chief Priest of Penang" and also declaring "the Chinese temple at Air Itam as the head of all Chinese temples in Penang". On the abbot's return to Penang, a royal procession, carrying the edict in a rattan chair and the scriptures in pony-driven carts, was organised leading to the temple complex. Prominent Chinese dignitaries of Penang in their royal mandarin attire accompanied the abbot in the procession.

Kek Lok Si pagoda tiers labelled with their architectural styles

In 1930, the seven-storey main pagoda of the temple, the "Ban Po Thar" (萬佛塔, "Pagoda of the Ten Thousand Buddhas"), a 30-metre-high (98 ft) structure, was completed. This pagoda combines a Chinese octagonal base with a middle tier of Thai design, and a Burmese crown (spiral dome); reflecting the temple's amalgam of both Mahayana and Theravada Buddhism. It represents syncretism of the ethnic and religious diversity in the country. There is a large statue of Buddha donated by King Bhumibol of Thailand deified here. King Rama VI of Thailand laid the foundation for the pagoda, so it is also named "Rama Pagoda".

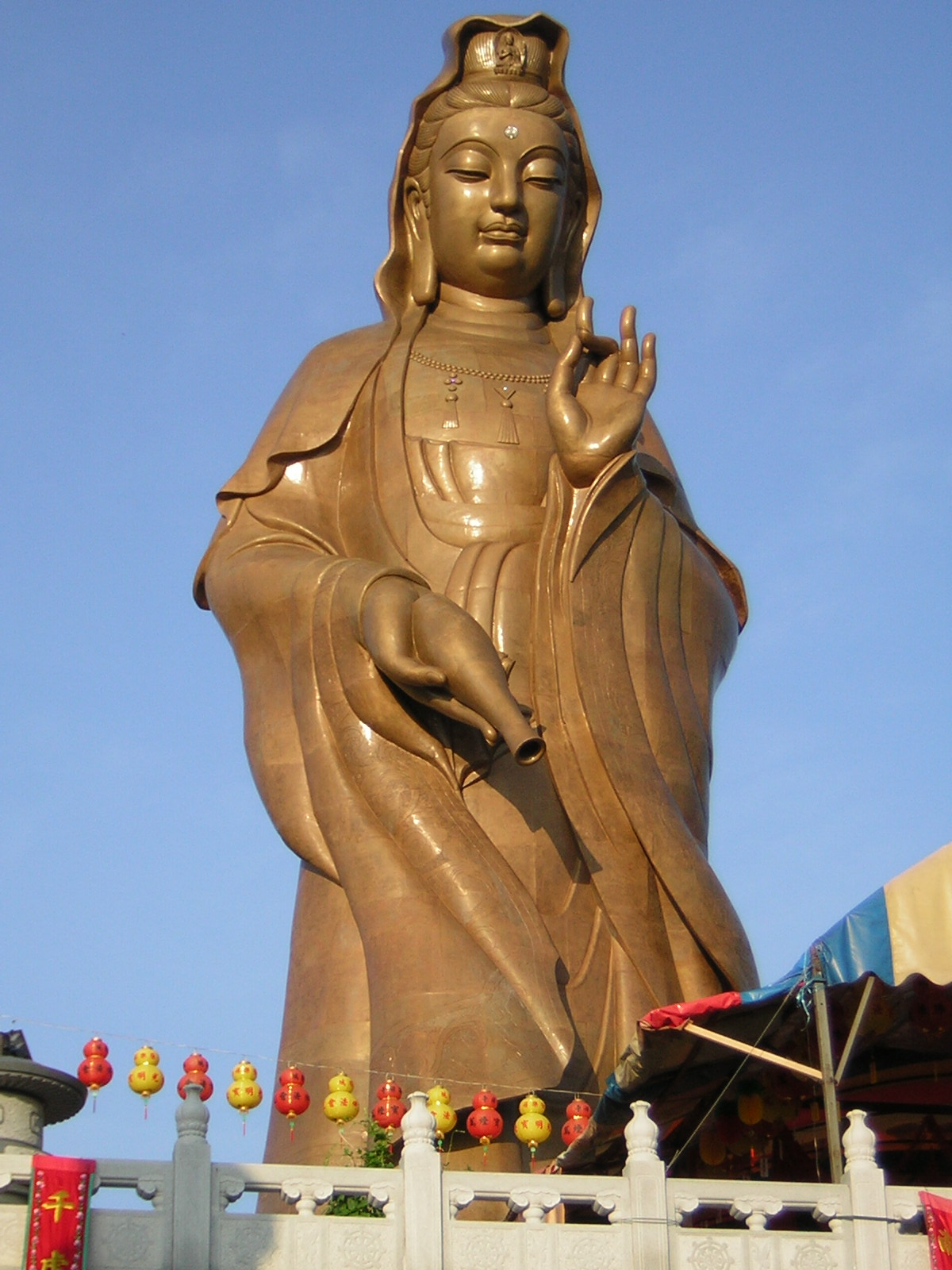
Statue of Guanyin, inaugurated in 2002 before the pavilion was built

In 2002, a 30.2-metre (99 ft) bronze statue of Guanyin, the Goddess of Mercy, was completed and opened to the public. It replaced the previous white plaster Kuan Yin statue which was damaged due to a fire a few years earlier. The bronze statue is located on the hillside above the pagoda. The statue is complemented with a 60.9 metres (200 ft) three-tiered roof pavilion (with 16 columns made of bronze supporting the pavilion), which was completed in 2009. At the time of completion, it was the second tallest Guanyin statue in the world. One hundred statues of the goddess Guanyin, each of 2 metres (6 ft 7 in) height, are set around the main statue of the goddess. However, its height was restricted to avoid its shadow falling on the Penang State Mosque. This shrine also has other 10,000 statues of Buddha, apart from a statue of 12 Zodiac Animal Signs of the Chinese Calendar.

The temple complex has a large hydraulically operated bell, which tolls with a high pitch at frequent intervals. Wood and stone carvings are profusely seen in the temple. In front of each deity there is a cushion, impressive scrolls, and candles set in very attractive suspended lamps, and with a large number of priests in attendance.

In October 2021, about 70% of one of the temple buildings was destroyed by a fire, with flames measuring about 12m by 15m. The cause of the fire has not been determined or revealed.

== Description ==
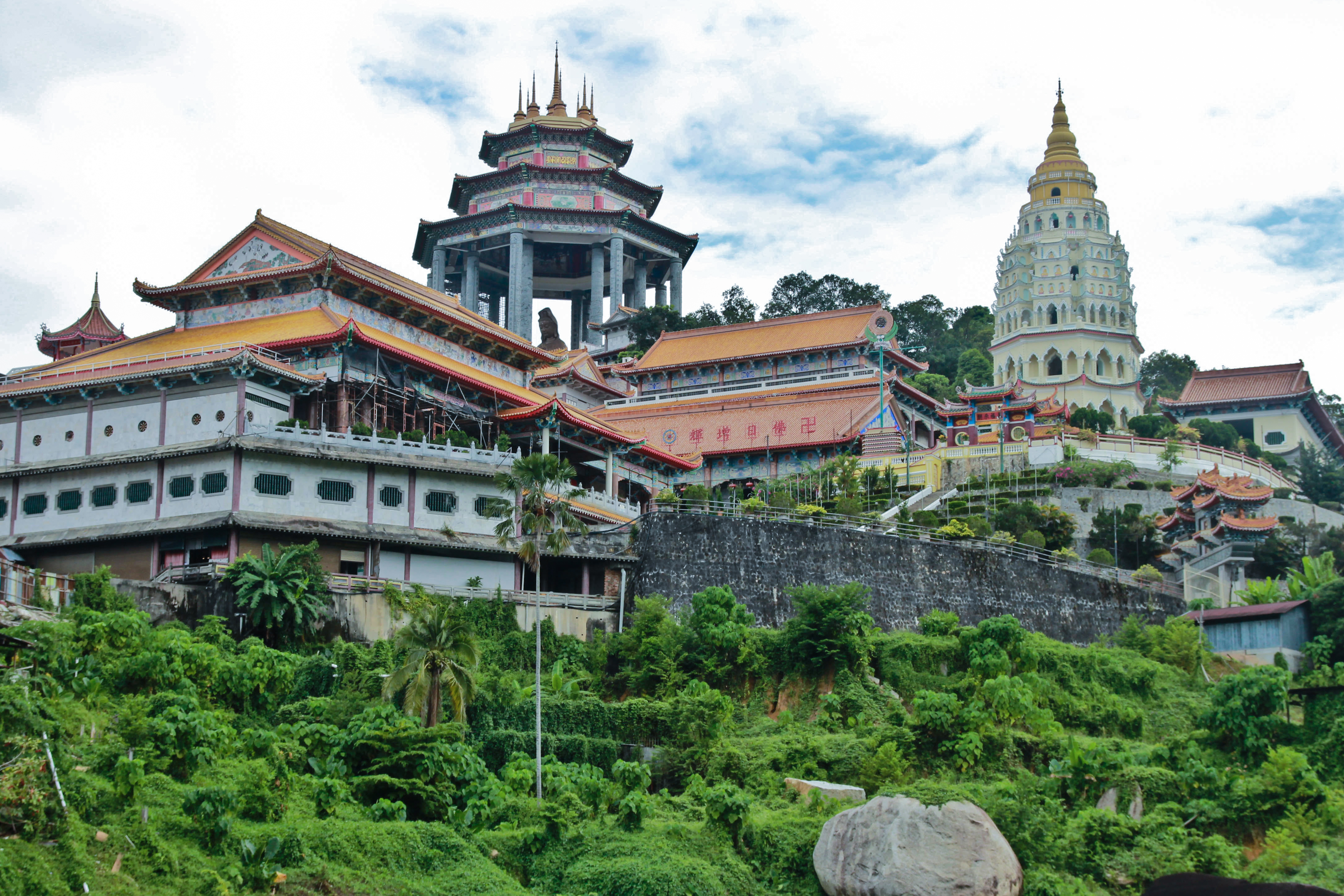
Kek Lok Si Temple viewed from Air Itam

Kek Lok Si Temple is located at the foot of the Air Itam mountain in George Town on Penang Island. It is built over a plot of an area of 12.1 hectares (30 acres) that was donated by Yeoh Siew Beow. It is about 3 kilometres (1.9 mi) walk from the Penang Hill Station.

Most visitors approach the temple as they ascend a stairway, roofs of which provide shelter to a multitude of shops selling souvenirs and other - mostly secular - commodities. They pass by a so-called Liberation Pond, following the Buddhist tradition of merit-making, turtles may be released into freedom, albeit a limited one.

The temple itself consists of several large prayer halls and pavilions for assembly and prayer, statues of Buddha; various Bodhisattvas as well as Chinese deities are being venerated. The architectural features include carved pillars, fine woodwork, mostly painted in bright colours, and a plethora of lanterns add to the visual impression. Fish ponds and flower gardens are also part of the temple complex.

There are two tiers of double-lane inclined elevators to carry pilgrims and visitors further uphill. An electric buggy service links the different tiers of elevators as their middle levels are some distance apart. On the elevated platform, there is a fish pond, and the towering statue of Guanyin, sometimes called the Goddess of Mercy due to her strong association with the Buddhist quality of compassion, beseeched by women hoping to have children. Monks and nuns reside in a monastery.

== Annual events ==
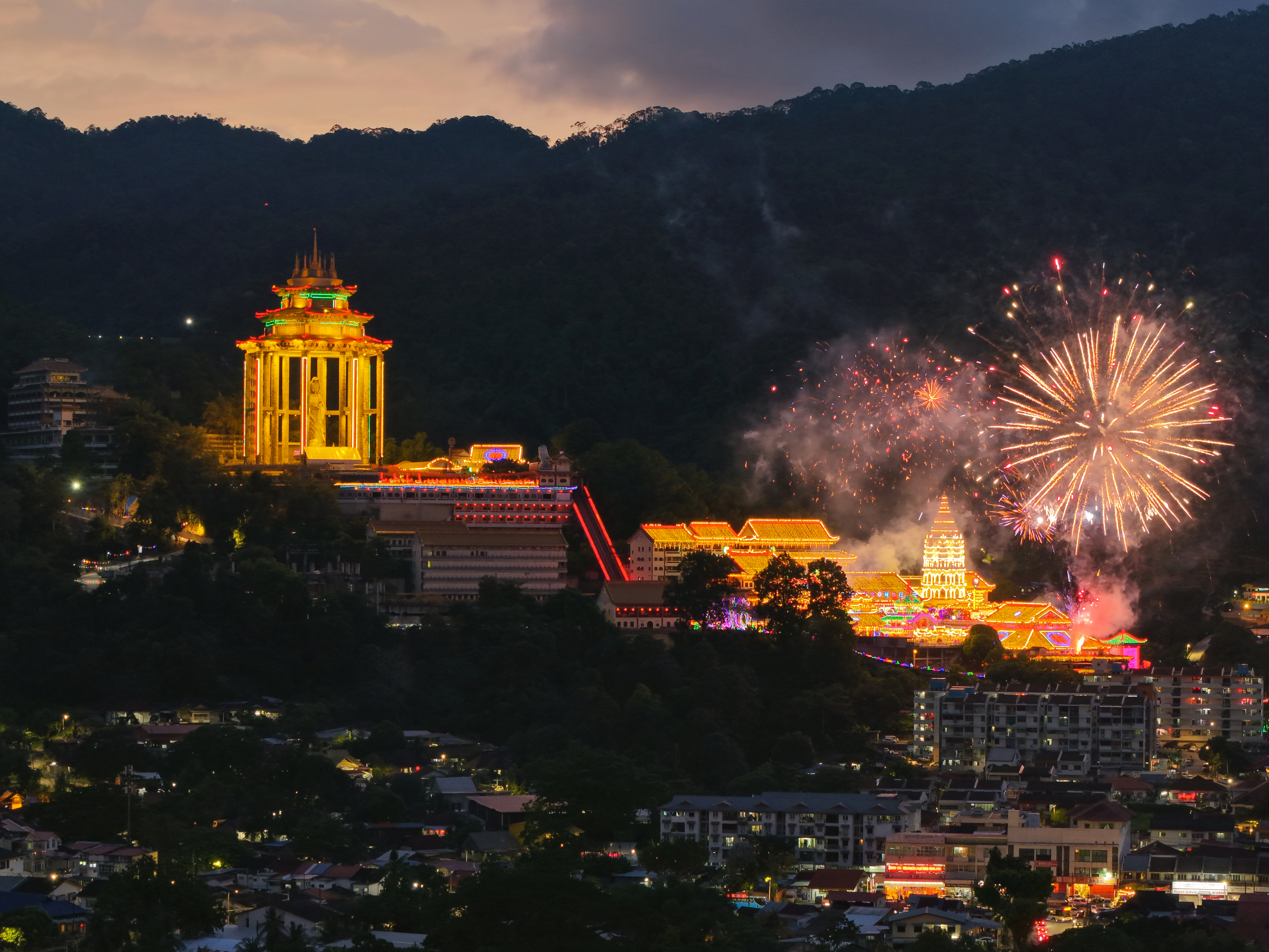
Kek Lok Si illuminated in preparation for Chinese New Year in 2025.

The temple is a focal point of festivals of the Chinese community in Penang. The Chinese New Year celebrations are particularly impressive. For 30 days following Chinese New Year, the temple remains open until late at night whilst thousands of lights turn the scenery into a sea of light. During the festival days, the complex is decorated with thousands of lanterns representing donations offered by devotees. Another festive feature is the long marches undertaken by hundreds of monks from Thailand to the temple, once or twice in a year.

== Worship ==
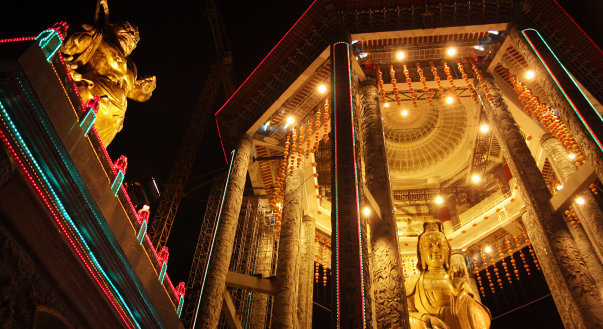
Octagonal pavilion over the statue of Guanyin

Worship of the deities in the temple complex reflects the diversity of the ethnic origins of the Buddhist devotees. Such worship could be in the form of counting prayer beads or by burning incense or by cash offerings or just by bowing and clapping to make one's presence known to the deity. Highly learned people offer prayers at the tower of Sacred Books in the upper part of the temple. Some pilgrims also offer prayers in the extensive gardens located in the precincts of the temple.

The religious paraphernalia sold along the winding steps that lead to the temple precincts cater to the religious offerings to be made by the pilgrims. The goods on sale comprise ornaments, books, pictures, collection of sayings and strings of a sacred orange colour and mementos such as T-shirts and CDs.

== Incidents ==
=== 2021 fire ===
A fire broke out at the temple on the morning of 12 October 2021. By the time the fire department arrived, flames had already engulfed one of the temple buildings . Penang fire and rescue department operations officer Muhamad Norhisham Ibrahim reported that the fire destroyed at least 70% of the 18.5 square-metre building. There were no casualties or injuries reported during the whole incident. The cause of the fire has not been revealed.

== See also ==
- Kek Lok Si Charitable Hospital
- Kong Meng San Phor Kark See Monastery
- Dhammikarama Burmese Temple
- Mahindarama Buddhist Temple
- Wat Buppharam
- Wat Chayamangkalaram
- Buddhism in Malaysia
