= Wine in China =

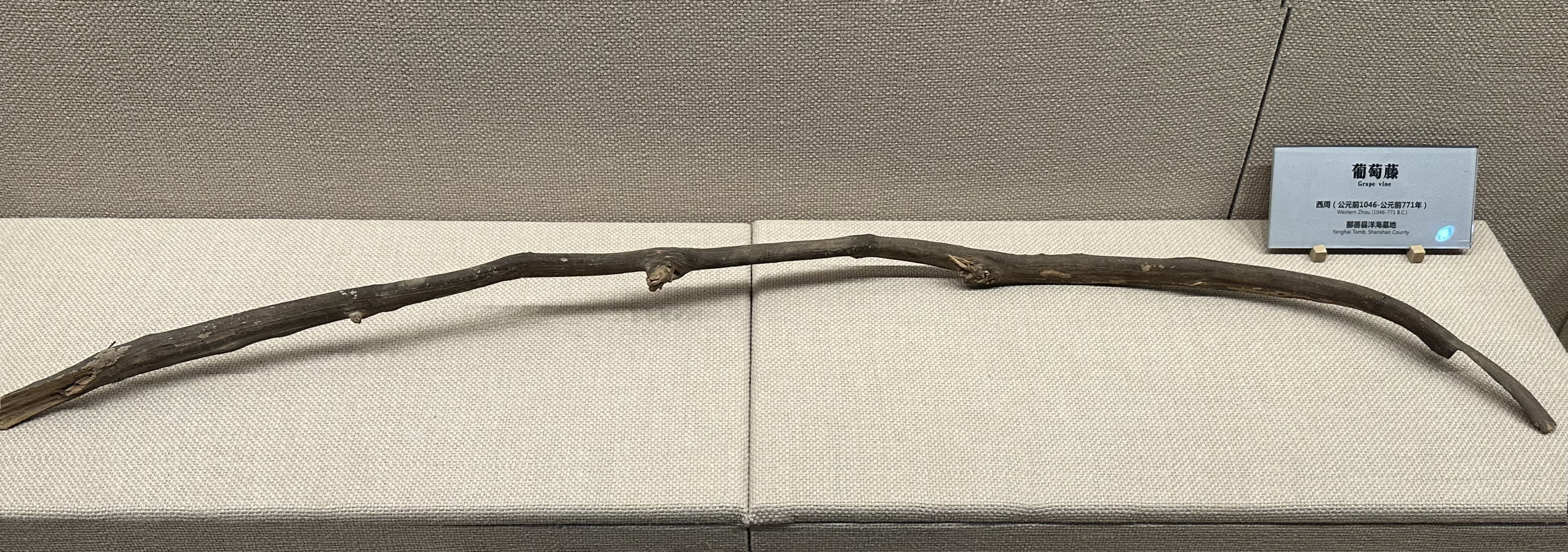
Grapevine from Yanghai, said to be the ancestor of wine in China. Turpan Museum.

Wine (Chinese: 葡萄酒 pútáojiǔ lit. "grape alcohol") has a long history in China. Although long overshadowed by huangjiu (sometimes translated as "yellow wine") and the much stronger distilled spirit baijiu, wine consumption has grown dramatically since the reform and opening up of the 1980s. China is now numbered among the top ten global markets for wine. Ties with French producers are especially strong, and Ningxia wines have received international recognition.

== History ==
"The Song of the Grape" (葡萄歌), by Liu Yuxi (772–842)

自言我晉人 We men of Tsin [Jin 晉 = Shanxi], such grapes so fair,
種此如種玉 Do cultivate as gems most rare;
釀之成美酒 Of these delicious wine we make,
令人飲不足 For which men ne'er their thirst can slake.
爲君持一斗 Take but a measure of this wine,
往取涼州牧 And Liang-chow's [= Liangzhou's] rule is surely thine.

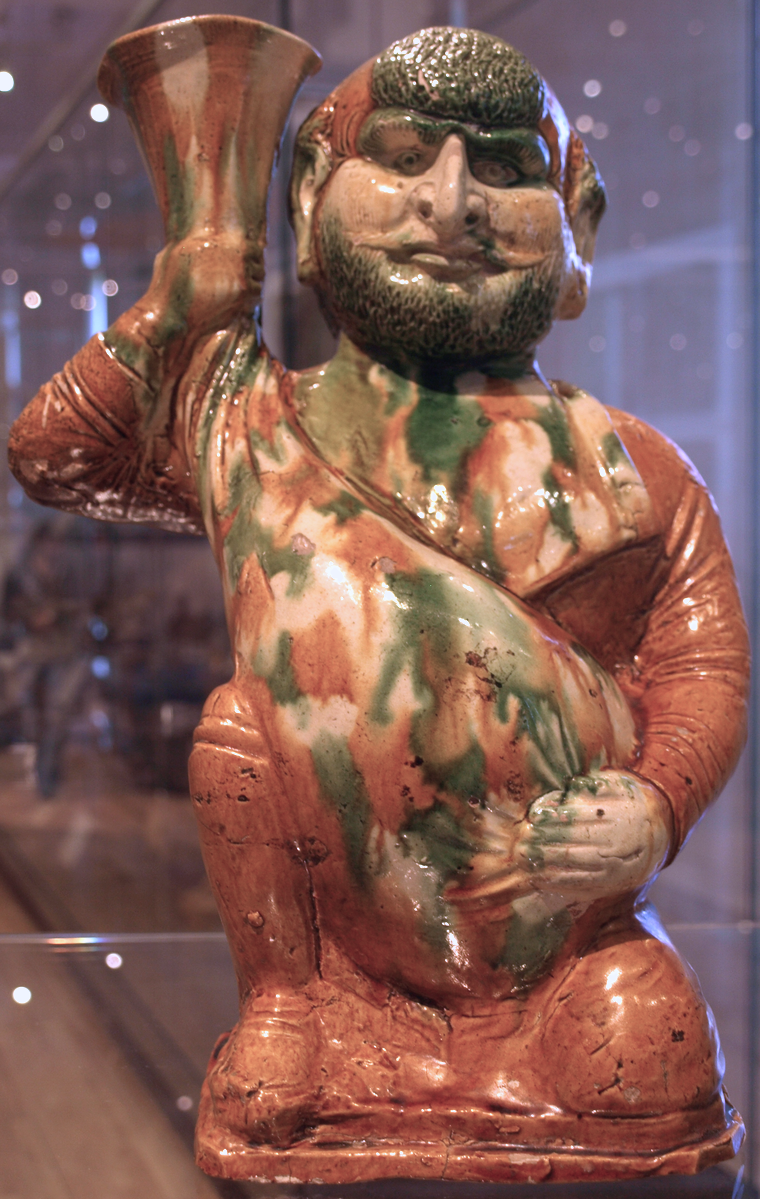
During the Tang dynasty (618–907), China started to import grape wine from Central Asia. Tang tricolor figurine of a Sogdian wine merchant holding a wineskin.

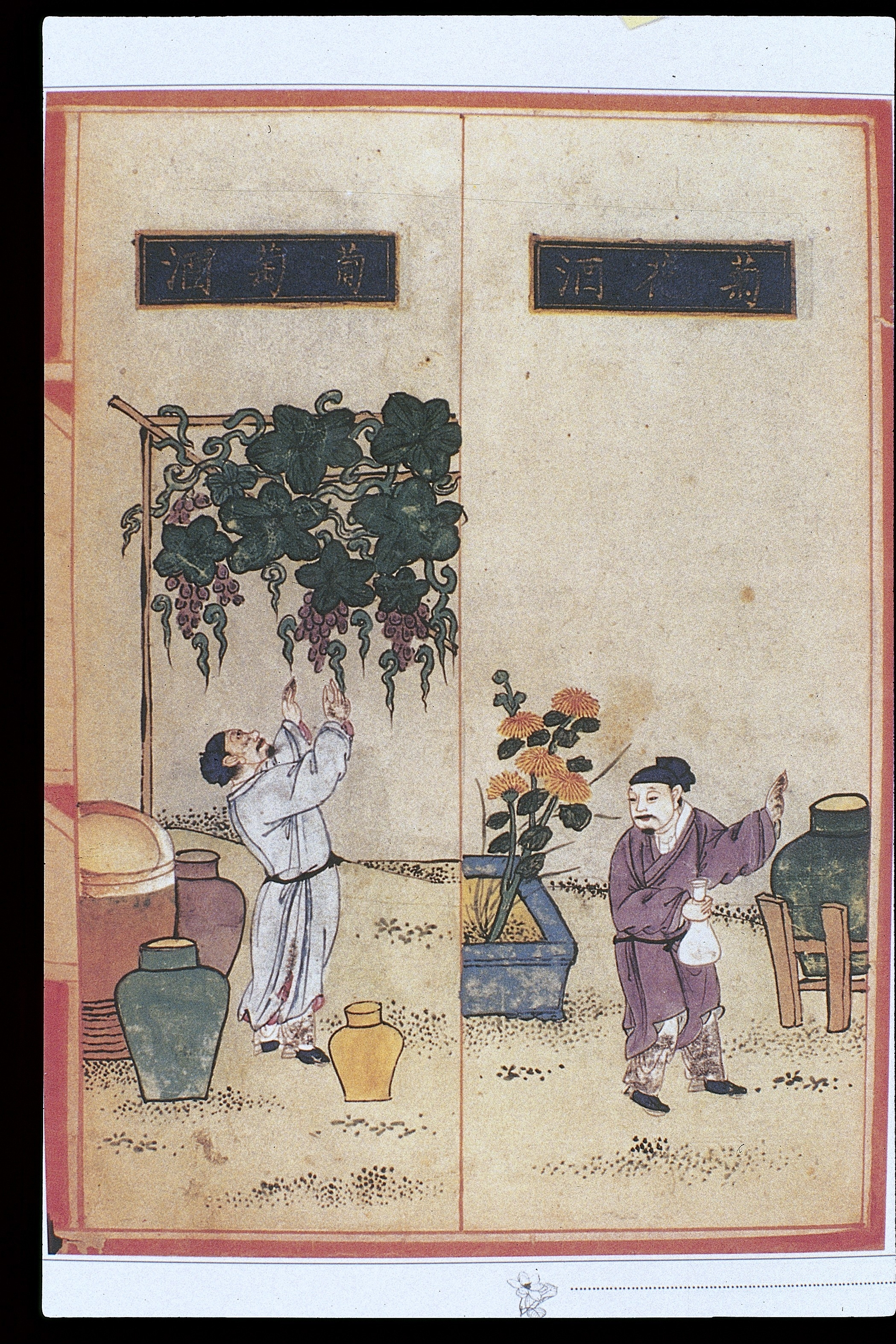
Illustration of the cultivation of grapes and winemaking in Materia Dietetica (Shiwu Bencao 食物本草), Ming dynasty (1368–1644)

Use of wild grapes in production of alcoholic beverages has been attested at the Jiahu archaeological site (c. 7000 BC). High quality wine called qióng jiāng yù yè (Chinese: 瓊漿玉液) is mentioned in the Complete Tang Poems (Quan Tangshi), an 18th-century collection of around 50,000 poems compiled during the reign of the Kangxi Emperor. The phrase translates literally to "jade-like wine", but has an idiomatic meaning along the lines of "wonderful wine".

In 1995, a joint Sino-USA archaeology team including archaeologists from the Archeology Research Institute of Shandong University and American archaeologists under the leadership of Professor Fang Hui investigated the two archaeological sites 20 km to the northeast of Rizhao, and discovered the remnants of a variety of alcoholic beverages including grape wine, rice wine, mead, and several mixed beverages of these wines. Out of more than two hundred ceramic pots discovered at the sites, seven were specifically used for grape wine. Remnants of grape seeds were also discovered. If grape wine consumption was once present in Bronze Age China, however, it was replaced by consumption of a range of alcoholic beverages made from sorghum, millet, rice, and fruits such as lychee or Asian plum. In the 130s and 120s BC, a Chinese imperial envoy of the Han dynasty (206 BC – 220 AD) named Zhang Qian opened diplomatic relations with several Central Asian kingdoms, some of which produced grape wine. By the end of the second century BC, Han envoys had brought grape seeds from the wine-loving kingdom of Dayuan (Ferghana in modern Uzbekistan) back to China and had them planted on imperial lands near the capital Chang'an (near modern-day Xi'an in Shaanxi province). The Shennong Bencao Jing, a work on materia medica compiled in the late Han, states that grapes could be used to produce wine. In the Three Kingdoms era (220–280 AD), Wei emperor Cao Pi noted that grape wine "is sweeter than the wine made [from cereals] using ferments and sprouted grain. One recovers from it more easily when one has taken too much." Grapes continued to be grown in the following centuries, notably in the northwestern region of Gansu, but were not used to produce wine on a large scale. Wine thus remained an exotic product known by few people.

Not until the Tang dynasty (618–907) did the consumption of grape wines become more common. After the Tang conquest of Gaochang – an oasis state on the Silk Road located near Turfan in modern Xinjiang – in 641, the Chinese obtained the seeds of an elongated grape called "mare teat" (maru 馬乳) and learned from Gaochang a "method of wine making" (jiu fa 酒法). Several Tang poets versified on grape wine, celebrating wine from the "Western Regions" – that from Liangzhou was particularly noted – or from Taiyuan in Shanxi, the latter of which produced wine made from the "mare teat" grape. Meng Shen's 孟詵 Materia Dietetica (Shiliao Bencao 食療本草) and the government-sponsored Newly Compiled Materia Medica (Xinxiu bencao 新修本草; 652) record that Tang people produced naturally fermented wine.

China's "first modern winery" Changyu was founded in 1892 in Shandong province near the treaty port of Chefoo (now called Yantai) by the overseas Chinese entrepreneur Zhang Bishi.

== Production ==
=== National trends ===
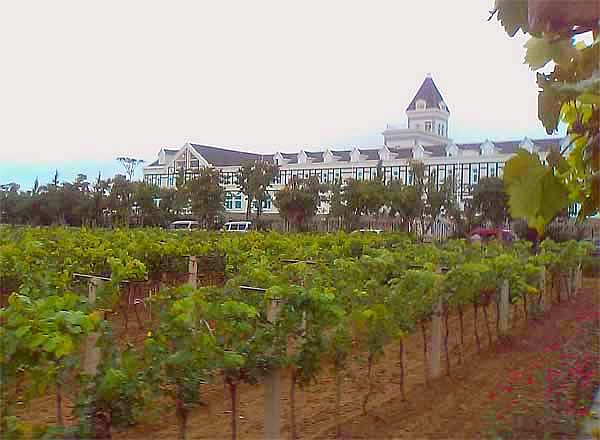
Château Changyu, Beiyujia Vineyards, Shandong, China

French wine was the first foreign wine imported into China. In 1980, at the beginning of the reform and opening up, Rémy Martin ventured into China to set up the first joint-venture enterprise in Tianjin: the Dynasty (Wang Chao, 王朝) Wine Ltd., which was also the second joint-venture enterprise in China. Over the years, the company developed over 90 brands of alcoholic beverages, and its products won numerous awards both domestically and abroad.

However, most of its products were exported abroad in the first two decades due to the low income of the local population, and it was not until after the year 2000 when the economic boom finally provided the domestic population with sufficient disposable income to support the domestic market; this relatively recent occurrence coincided with the increased popularity of French wine in China. Other companies, including China Great Wall Wine Co., Ltd, Suntime and Changyu, have also risen in prominence, and by 2005, 90% of grape wine produced was consumed locally.

Also, as globalization has brought China onto the international economic scene, so too has its winemaking industry come onto the international wine scene. China has a long tradition of the fermentation and distillation of Chinese wine, including all alcoholic beverages and not necessarily grape wine, but is one of the most recent participants in the globalization of wine that started years ago in Paris, when several countries such as Canada realized that they may be able to produce wines as good as most French wine.

Quite recently, Chinese grape wine has begun appearing on shelves in California and in Western Canada. While some critics have treated these wines with the same type of disregard with which Chilean and Australian wines were once treated, others have recognized a new frontier with the potential to yield some interesting finds. Others have simply taken notice that China is producing drinkable table wines comparable to wines from other countries. Among the latest developments is the production of organic wine in Inner Mongolia.

As of 2012, a small number of large companies, such as Changyu Pioneer Wine, China Great Wall Wine Co., Ltd. and the Dynasty Wine Ltd., dominate domestic production. The total production of wine in 2004 was 370 thousand tons, a 15% increase from the previous year. The total market grew 58% between 1996 and 2001, and 68% between 2001 and 2006.

In 2008, wine merchant Berry Brothers and Rudd predicted that within 50 years the quality of Chinese wine will rival that of Bordeaux.

=== Wine-producing regions ===
Notable wine-producing regions include Beijing, Yantai, Zhangjiakou in Hebei, Yibin in Sichuan, Tonghua in Jilin, Taiyuan in Shanxi, and Ningxia. The largest producing region is Yantai-Penglai; with over 140 wineries, it produces 40% of China's wine.

==== Xinjiang ====
China's Xinjiang Autonomous Region have an ancient history of viticulture going back to around the 4th Century BC, when Greek settlers brought the vine and more advanced irrigation techniques. However new archeological evidence has shown this to be untrue, because China produced grape wine, rice wine, mead (honey wine) 9000 years ago (7000 BC). The area around Turfan was, and still is, particularly noted for its grape production, and production of grape wines is mentioned in the historical record as well; Marco Polo mentioned that Carachoco (the name he used for Turfan) produced fine grape wines. The modern wine industry is largely patterned after French methods with a concentration on varieties like Cabernet. However, the Uighur traditional technique has survived especially in counties surrounding Kashgar. The Uighur home-made wine generally called "museles" (from Arabic "المثلث ", meaning "the triangle") is still being brewed by households in many villages. Unlike wines west of Xinjiang, the brewing of museles requires crushing of local varieties of grapes by hand, then strained using the Uighur atlas silk, then boiled with amount of water equal to the juice and desired portion of sugar, until the volume of the mixture is down to the original volume of the juice, then stored in clay urns together with folk recipes varying by localities---in some counties, traditional Uighur herbal medicines, and goji, mulberries, sea-buckthorn, cloves, etc. in others, and even raw and unfeathered pheasants or poussin in others. The brew usually takes more than a month to accomplish. It is then un-urned, filtered and bottled to be stored for long periods. In some villages, the ritual of communally gathering a mixture of folk museles brews in a large village urn marks the occasion following the harvest and process of grapes. Museles is now being standardized by the wine producing industry in China and marketed under the brand-name of Merceles.

==== Ningxia ====
In September 2011, Ningxia winery Helan Qingxue won the Decanter World Wine Award's Red Bordeaux Varietal Over £10 International Trophy for its 2009 Jiabeilan, a Cabernet sauvignon blend. This win was widely considered an upset, with some wine experts even questioning the veracity of origin of the wine. On 14 December 2011 in Beijing, in a competition tagged "Bordeaux against Ningxia", experts from China and France blind-tasted five wines from each region. Four out of five of the top wines were from Ningxia. Emma Gao of Silver Heights Vineyard is one of the top winemakers in the region, her first vintage was praised by Chinese and international winemakers, and two of her red wines are among the best known produced in China.

==== Shanxi ====
In the "Bordeaux against Ningxia" wine challenge held in Beijing in October 2011, Grace Vineyard's 2009 Chairman's Reserve, a 100% Cabernet Sauvignon, was voted best.

== Consumption ==
=== Market trends ===
China is among the top ten wine markets in the world. According to a study by Vinexpo and International Wine and Spirits Research (IWSR), China was the world's fifth-largest consumer of wine (both domestic and imported) in 2011. A study by the same organizations revealed in 2014 estimates that 2.17 billion bottles of wine were consumed in China in 2013, keeping China in fifth place. Because Chinese mostly drink red wine, China is now the world's largest market for red wine. China's consumption of red wine has grown by 136% since 2008, whereas it has declined by 18% in France, the second-largest consumer. The United States remains the largest market for all types of wine (red, white, rosé, and sparkling), with total sales of approximately 4 billion bottles, slightly ahead of France and followed by Italy and the United Kingdom.

The Chinese wine market has experienced a 20% annualized growth rate between 2006 and 2011, and is forecast to grow by another 54% by 2015.

In 2009, Sotheby's reported that Hong Kong had become the world's largest market for fine wines at auction, surpassing previous leaders New York City, and London.

=== Products and availability ===
Most medium to large restaurants, regardless of the fare, sell wine by the bottle, usually only red. Generally, only high-end restaurants serve wine by the glass. Wine sold by the bottle is also available at large KTV establishments, and major hotels.

Since around 2008, many small convenience stores have begun to carry a small selection of wines, with specialty wine shops emerging in cities throughout the country. These specialize in both foreign and domestic brands. Meanwhile, major supermarkets have steadily increased their selection, from several domestic brands, to a wide variety of wines from around the world. In addition, plenty varieties of wines are also available through online shops and platforms. Among these are sweetened, flavoured wines. These are made of a mixture of grape wine and a sweetened, flavoured drink similar to Kool-aid. These wines have similar labels to genuine wines, have an alcohol content of approximately 6%, and are much lower in price.

=== Demographics and preferences ===
A survey conducted with 1,440 respondents reveals that Chinese prefer red wine to white wine. 94% of the respondents consumed red wine, while only 35% of them drank white wine. This trend is, however, contrasting when measured among younger generations. Chinese young people prefer white to red wine and they consider the latter traditional and outdated.

Statistics show that the main market for white wine is among females, who prefer it over beer, still the main alcoholic beverage for most males; red wine has become a symbol of the elite and rich and is usually used as a table wine. In 2005, 80% of vineyards produce red wine and 20% of vineyards produce white wine, while 90% of wine consumed as of 2007 is red wine.

=== Method of consumption ===
Both red and white wines are commonly served chilled. The wine may be poured into ordinary wine glasses in tiny amounts, or very small, glass baijiu glasses. When served at a table with more than two people, similar to the style of drinking baijiu, it is typically consumed during a group toast, and often with the entire glass being finished at once. This is particularly true when served during restaurant meals.

== See also ==
- Baijiu
- Chinese alcoholic beverages
- Globalization of wine
- Huangjiu
- Kaoliang wine
- Maotai
- Tonghua Grape Wine
- Zhuolu County
- Winemaking
