= Yongning County =

Yongning 永宁县 يٌ‌نِئٍ ثِيًا
- County
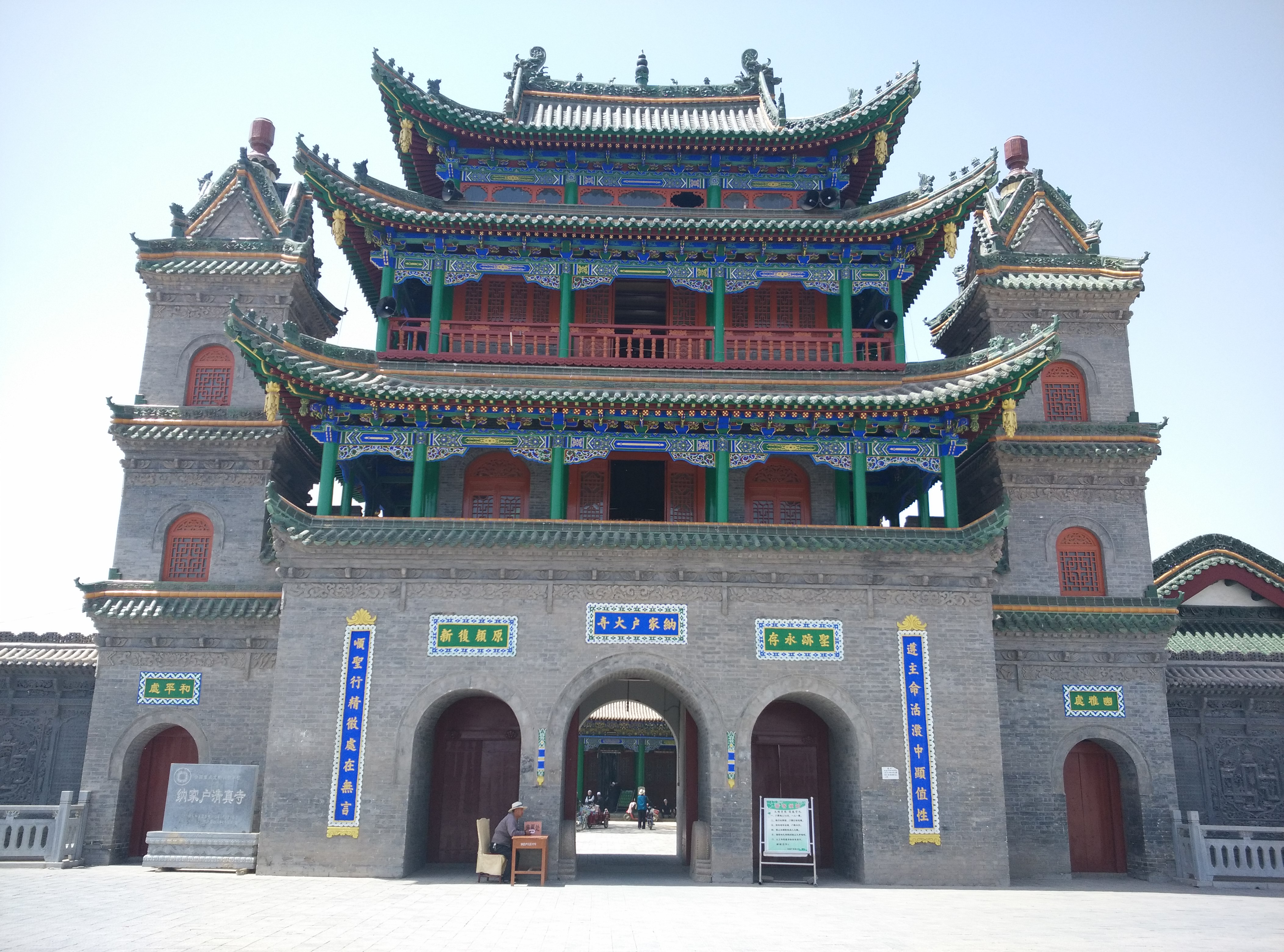

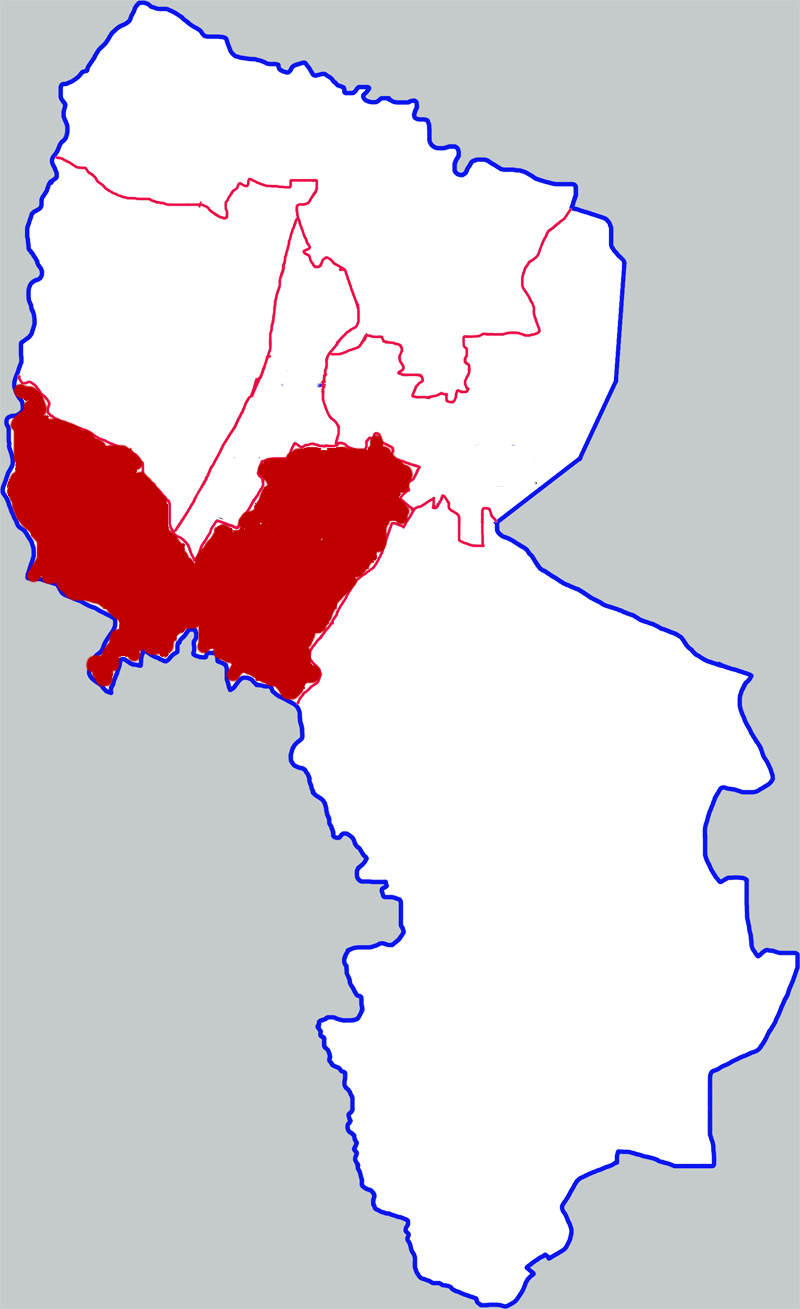
- Yongning in Yinchuan

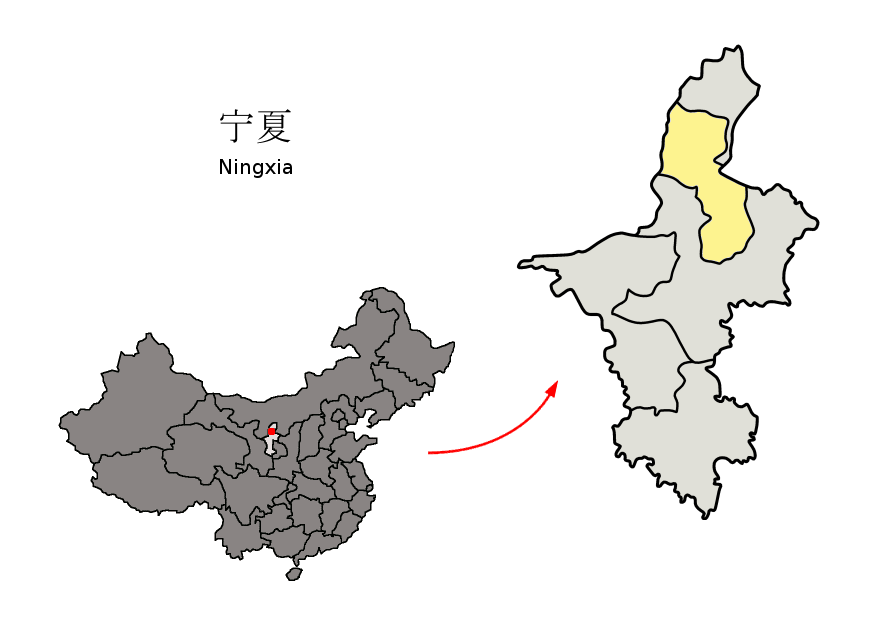
- Yinchuan in Ningxia
- Coordinates: 38°16′39″N 106°15′11″E
- Country: China
- Autonomous region: Ningxia
- Prefecture-level city: Yinchuan
- County seat: Tuanjiexilu

Area
  - Total: 934.06 km^{2} (360.64 sq mi)

Population
  - Total: 218,260
  - Density: 233.67/km^{2} (605.20/sq mi)
- Time zone: UTC+8 (China Standard)

Yongning County (simplified Chinese: 永宁县; traditional Chinese: 永寧縣; pinyin: Yǒngníng Xiàn; Wade–Giles: Yung-ning Hsien, Xiao'erjing: يٌ‌نِئٍ ثِيًا) is a county of Ningxia Hui Autonomous Region, China, it is under the administration of the prefecture-level city of Yinchuan, the capital of Ningxia, bordering Inner Mongolia to the west. It has a total area of 1,295 km^{2} (500 sq mi), and a population of approximately 200,000 people.

== Characteristics ==
Yongning County is an agricultural county, with abundant resources and high quality products. In recent years, the county's major crops have been melons and vegetables. Food processing factories have been established as well. The county government is located on Yanghe Street, and the county's postal code is 750100.

The Helan Mountain foothills of Yongning are the center of Ningxia's wine industry.

== Administrative divisions ==
Yongning County has 1 subdistrict, 5 towns, 1 township and 2 other.

1 subdistrict

- Tuanjiexilu (团结西路街道)

5 towns

- Yanghe (杨和镇, یَانْ‌حَ جٍ)
- Minning (闽宁镇, مٍ‌نِئٍ جٍ)
- Wanghong (望洪镇, وَانْ‌خْو جٍ)
- Wangyuan (望远镇, وَانْ‌يُوًا جٍ)
- Lijun (李俊镇, لِ‌ڭٌ جٍ)

1 township

- Shengli (胜利乡, 胜利乡, شٍْ‌لِ ثِيَانْ)

2 other

- Yuquanying Farm (玉泉营农场, ۋِٿُوًايٍ نْوچَانْ)
- Huangyangtan Farm (黄羊滩农场, خُوَانْ‌يَانْ‌تًا نْوچَانْ)

== Climate ==
Climate data for Yongning, elevation 1,116 m (3,661 ft), (1991–2020 normals, extremes 1981–2010)
Month	Jan	Feb	Mar	Apr	May	Jun	Jul	Aug	Sep	Oct	Nov	Dec	Year
Record high °C (°F)	13.5 (56.3)	19.8 (67.6)	27.1 (80.8)	34.7 (94.5)	34.5 (94.1)	37.5 (99.5)	38.5 (101.3)	36.9 (98.4)	35.4 (95.7)	28.7 (83.7)	23.7 (74.7)	16.7 (62.1)	38.5 (101.3)
Mean daily maximum °C (°F)	0.5 (32.9)	5.8 (42.4)	12.9 (55.2)	20.6 (69.1)	25.4 (77.7)	29.4 (84.9)	31.0 (87.8)	29.1 (84.4)	24.3 (75.7)	18.0 (64.4)	9.2 (48.6)	2.0 (35.6)	17.3 (63.2)
Daily mean °C (°F)	−6.5 (20.3)	−1.9 (28.6)	5.3 (41.5)	12.9 (55.2)	18.2 (64.8)	22.6 (72.7)	24.5 (76.1)	22.5 (72.5)	17.2 (63.0)	10.3 (50.5)	2.6 (36.7)	−4.4 (24.1)	10.3 (50.5)
Mean daily minimum °C (°F)	−12.0 (10.4)	−7.9 (17.8)	−0.8 (30.6)	6.0 (42.8)	11.5 (52.7)	16.2 (61.2)	18.6 (65.5)	17.1 (62.8)	11.7 (53.1)	4.6 (40.3)	−2.0 (28.4)	−9.3 (15.3)	4.5 (40.1)
Record low °C (°F)	−24.7 (−12.5)	−23.2 (−9.8)	−16.6 (2.1)	−6.3 (20.7)	−3.0 (26.6)	4.4 (39.9)	10.2 (50.4)	8.9 (48.0)	−1.5 (29.3)	−9.4 (15.1)	−14.5 (5.9)	−25.1 (−13.2)	−25.1 (−13.2)
Average precipitation mm (inches)	1.5 (0.06)	2.0 (0.08)	5.4 (0.21)	10.3 (0.41)	20.0 (0.79)	26.6 (1.05)	38.8 (1.53)	36.2 (1.43)	27.7 (1.09)	11.9 (0.47)	5.1 (0.20)	1.1 (0.04)	186.6 (7.36)
Average precipitation days (≥ 0.1 mm)	1.8	1.3	2.1	3.2	4.7	6.0	7.2	7.7	6.7	4.0	1.8	0.9	47.4
Average snowy days	2.7	1.6	1.2	0.3	0	0	0	0	0	0.3	1.4	1.3	8.8
Average relative humidity (%)	53	45	41	37	44	53	60	65	65	58	59	56	53
Mean monthly sunshine hours	196.9	203.9	239.8	260.4	291.4	286.9	283.1	260.9	221.3	234.2	206.4	197.5	2,882.7
Percentage possible sunshine	64	66	64	65	66	65	63	63	60	68	69	67	65
Source: China Meteorological Administration

== Transportation ==
- China National Highway 211
