= Leith Street, George Town =

Road in the Malaysian state of Penang

Leith Street
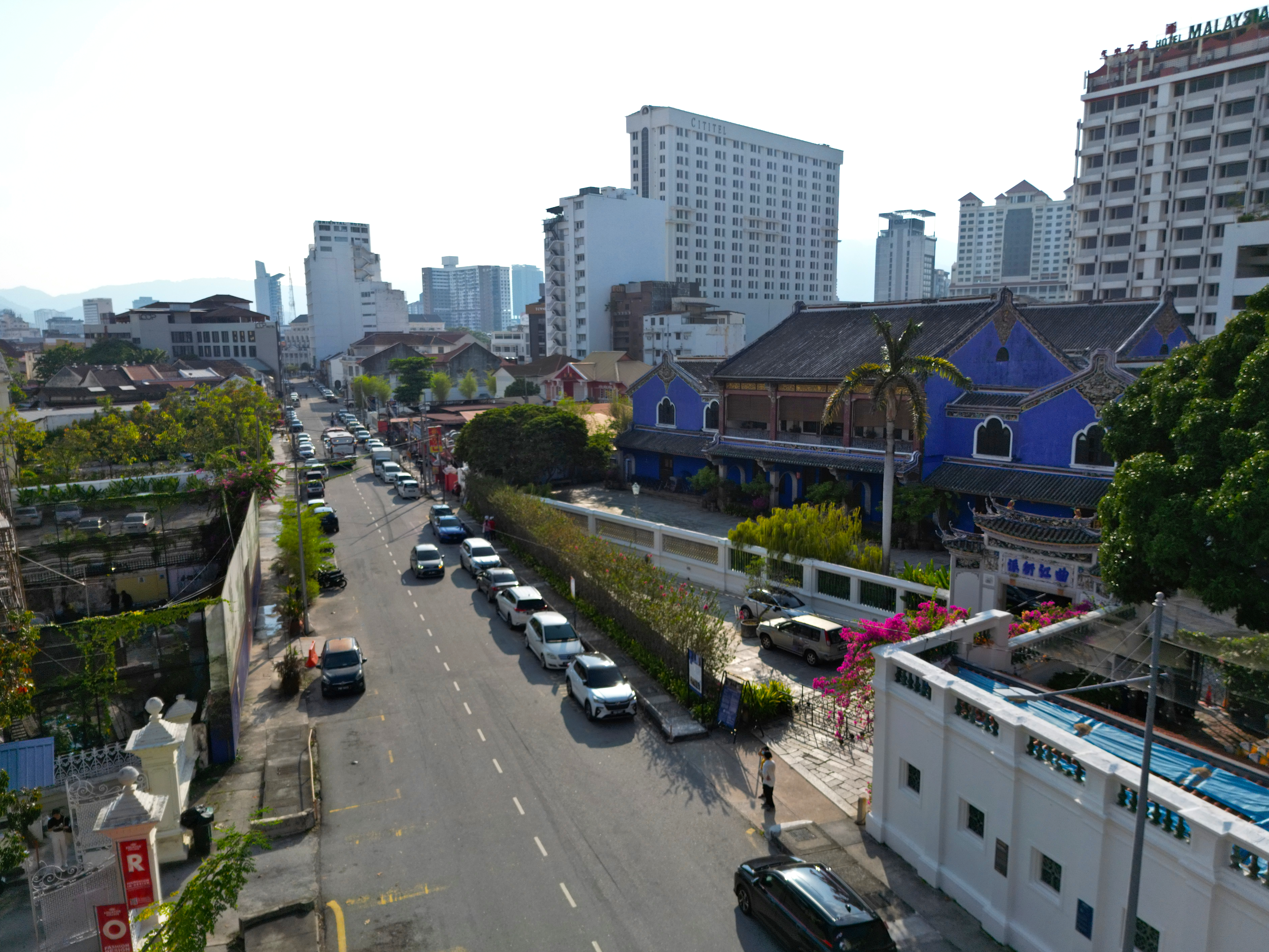
- Native name: Malay: Lebuh Leith; Simplified Chinese: 莲花河; traditional Chinese: 蓮花河; Hokkien POJ: Liân-hua-hô
- Maintained by: Penang Island City Council
- Location: George Town
- Coordinates: 5.42112°N 100.334914°E
- North end: Farquhar Street
- South end: Chulia Street

Construction
- Inauguration: Early 19th century
- LEBUH LEITH Leith St10200 P. PINANG

UNESCO World Heritage Site
- Type: Cultural
- Criteria: ii, iii, iv
- Designated: 2008 (32nd session)
- Part of: George Town UNESCO Buffer Zone
- Reference no.: 1223
- Region: Asia-Pacific

Leith Street is a narrow road within the UNESCO World Heritage Site of the city of George Town within the Malaysian state of Penang. Once known as an enclave for rich Hakka tycoons, it is home to the famous Cheong Fatt Tze Mansion.

The road was laid out in the early 19th century and named after one of the first Governors of Penang.

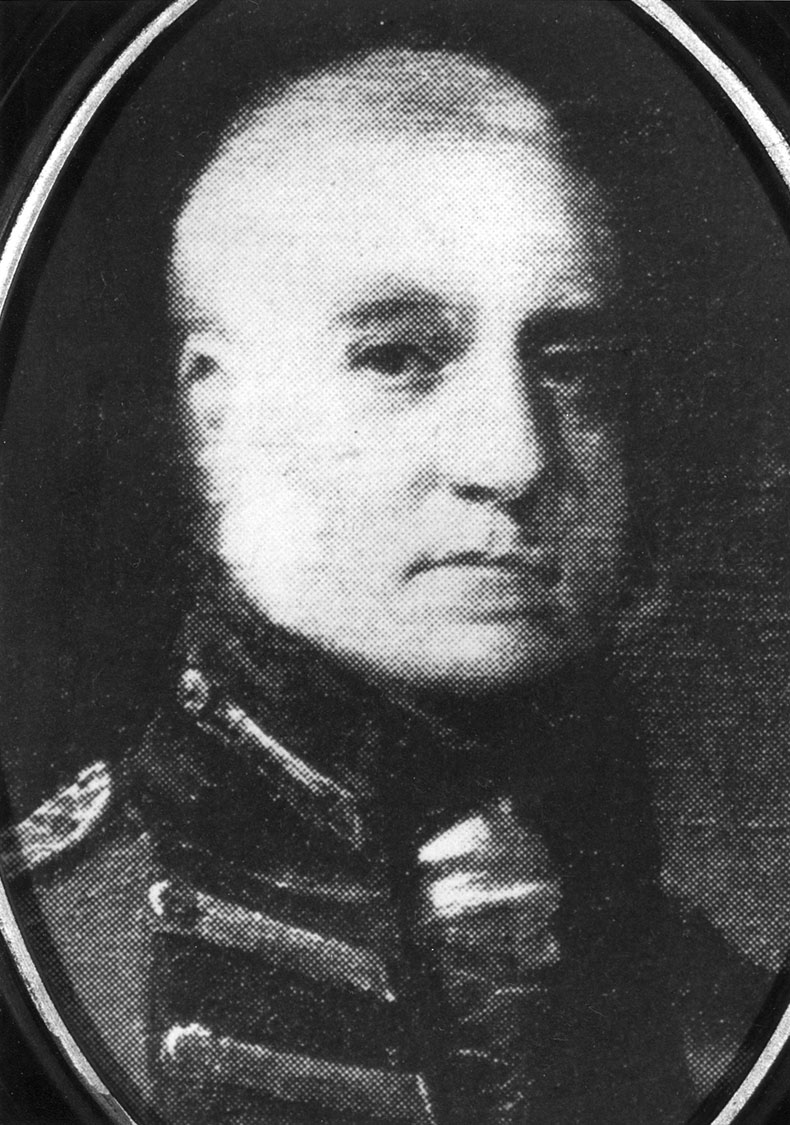
Sir George Alexander William Leith, the Lieutenant-Governor of the Prince of Wales Island (1800-1803)

== Etymology ==
Leith Street was named after George Alexander William Leith, who became the Lieutenant-Governor of Penang between 1800 and 1803. During Leith's tenure, he succeeded in gaining a narrow hinterland on the Malay Peninsula directly opposite Penang Island from Kedah; the land was subsequently named Province Wellesley (now Seberang Perai).

Leith also presided over the establishment of a committee of assessors in 1800. It was the first local authority to be founded in Malaya; the committee would gradually evolve over the centuries into the present-day Penang Island City Council.

When Leith Street was created in the early 19th century, the road was to be lined with palm trees, hence the Malay nickname Nyior Cabang.

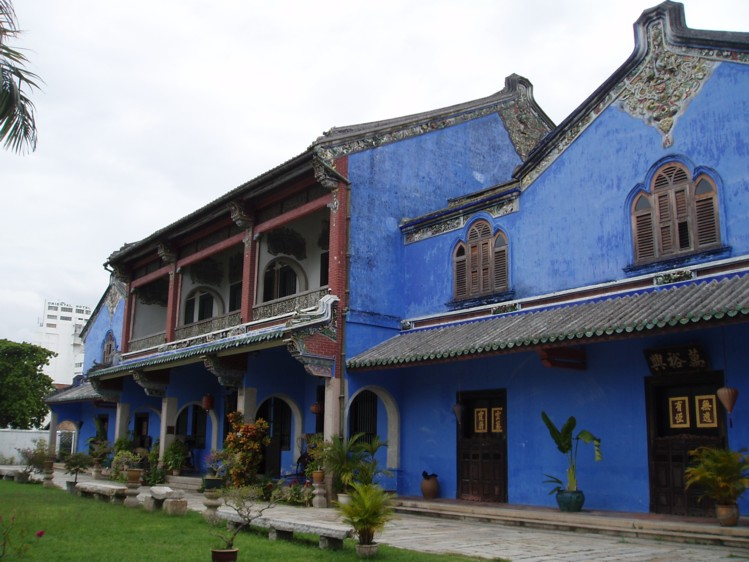
The famous Cheong Fatt Tze Mansion was built towards the end of the 19th century.

== History ==
Leith Street was originally populated by Indian Muslims who arrived from southern India, such as the Bengalis and Biharis. At the time, ethnic Indians dominated a large portion of the new settlement of George Town, with Leith Street becoming an extension of the Little India enclave that was centred around the adjoining Chulia Street.

During the 19th century, Leith Street witnessed major demographic changes. As rich Chinese businessmen moved in, the road became gentrified. By the start of the 20th century, Leith Street was known as the Hakka Millionaire's Row, after the rich Hakkas who resided along the road, such as Tye Kee Yoon and Cheong Fatt Tze. The Hakka tycoons built elegant mansions combining European and Chinese architectural styles along Leith Street; the Cheong Fatt Tze Mansion stands to this day as a testimony of this particular opulent era in Penang's history.

Notably, Leith Street is also known as the place where the renowned shoemaker, Jimmy Choo, started making shoes as an apprentice.

== Landmarks ==
- Cheong Fatt Tze Mansion

== See also ==
- List of roads in George Town
- Architecture of Penang
