= Hsieh Yung-kuan =

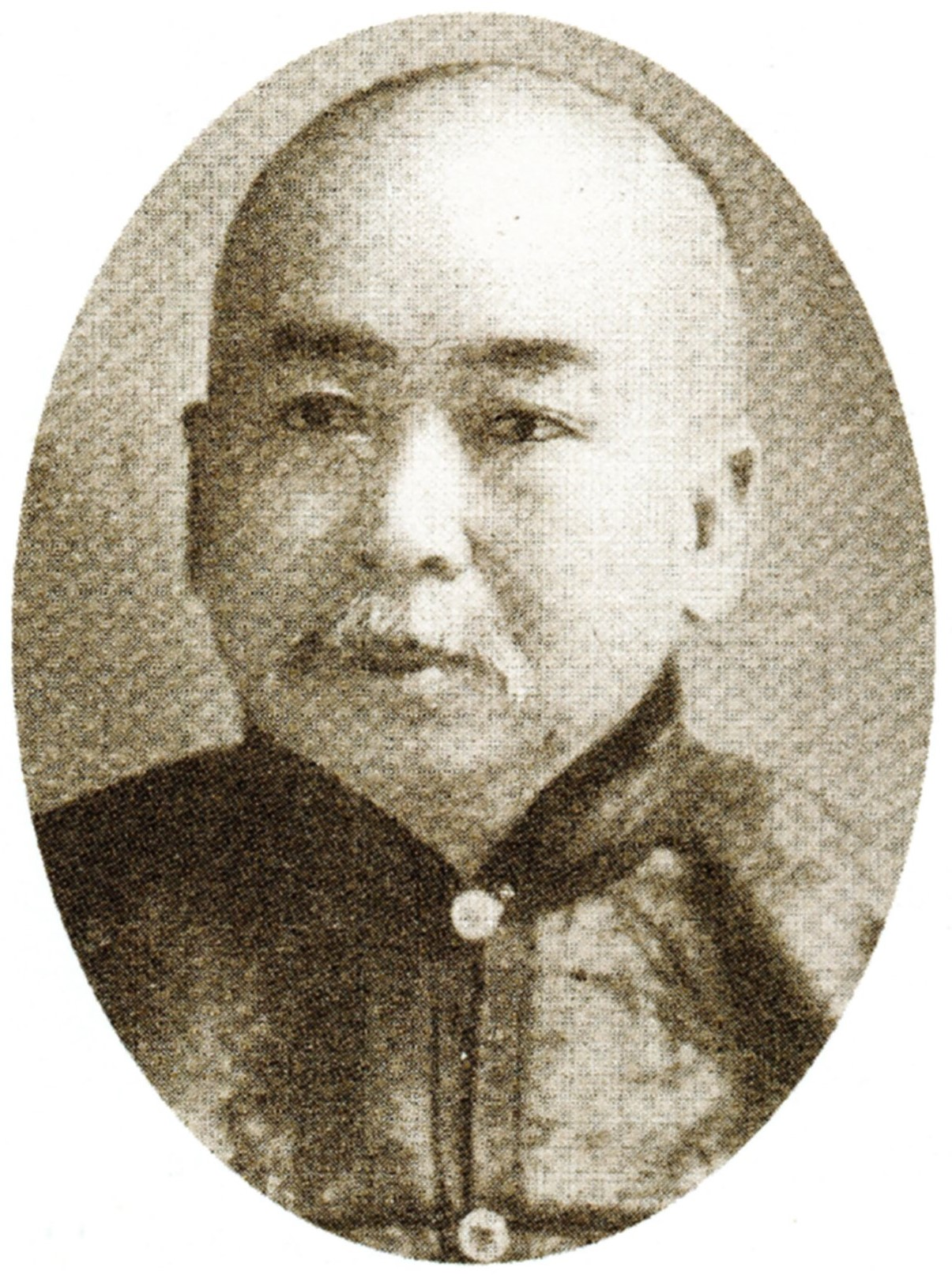
- Born: 1848; Pontianak, Dutch East Indies
- Died: February 4, 1916 (aged 67–68); Leith Street, George Town, Penang, Straits Settlements
- Occupation(s): Kapitein der Chinezen, Chinese Vice Consul to Penang, Merchant
- Notable work: Founder of Deli Bank in Medan

Hsieh Yung-kuan, Kapitein der Chinezen (Chinese: 謝榮光; born in 1848), also known as Cheah Meng Chi (謝夢池), Cheah Choon Seng or Tjia Tjoen Sen (謝春生), was a Hakka businessman and bureaucrat from Meixian, Guangdong, China, who was Chinese Vice Consul in Penang from 1895–1903 and from 1906-1907. He was also a founding director of the Deli Bank in Medan, Indonesia.

Born in 1848 in Pontianak, Dutch East Indies, he became a contractor of provisions and foodstuffs to the Dutch Government for eight years before moving to Kota Raja or Banda Acheh on the east coast of Sumatra. There, he further obtained fresh contracts for the construction of railroads and for opium and other revenue farms.

He was appointed Luitenant der Chinezen, an administrative post in the Dutch colonial government which he held for twenty-one years, after which he was promoted to the higher rank of Kapitein der Chinezen. The Dutch Government conferred on him the Gold Star for "Trouw en Verdienste" and with a gold medal for outstanding contributions to the colonial authorities. Around 1898 he relinquished management of his business interests there, handing them over to the management of his attorney, Mr. Leong Mok On, and moved to Penang where he lived at No. 8, Leith Street. He was appointed Chinese Vice-Consul to Penang, a position that was taken up by his son-in-law, Mr. Leong Fee, upon his resignation. He had interests in the Tambun mines in Perak and the Bentong mines near Kuala Lumpur. He was a member of the Penang Chinese Town Hall committee. He married the daughter of the Mayor of Pontianak, Mr. Chong Hi. Together with Cheong Fatt Tze (Tjong Tjen Hsoen), Leong Fee (梁輝), Tjong Yiauw Hian/Zhang Yao Xuan (張耀軒), and Foo Choo Choon (胡子春), he founded the Chung Hua School (中華學校 or 中華學堂, the first modern Chinese school in Malaya teaching in Mandarin. Cheah Choon Seng died on 4 February 1916.
