= Deli Bank =

First Chinese bank in Indonesia

The Deli Bank; (Chinese: 日里银行) was the first Chinese bank in Indonesia. It was founded in Medan, Indonesia, in 1907 by the Tjong brothers, Tjong A Fie, (1860-1921) and Tjong Yong Hian (1850-1911), Mandarin capitalists from Mei Hsien, Guangdong, China, who had come over originally to recruit and supply Chinese coolies for plantation workers. Also involved at this time were Cheong Fatt Tze who had entered the region from China, through Indonesia where he built his fortune but who was by that time, Vice-Consul for China, in Penang. Hsieh Yung-kuan was the fourth founding director of the bank.
