= Minning, Ningxia =

Minning 闽宁镇
- Town
- Location in Ningxia
- Coordinates: 38°14′40″N 105°58′18″E
- Country: People's Republic of China
- Autonomous region: Ningxia
- Prefecture-level city: Yinchuan
- County: Yongning County
- Time zone: UTC+8 (China Standard)

Minning (simplified Chinese: 闽宁; traditional Chinese: 閩寧; pinyin: Mǐnníng) is a town under the administration of Yongning County, Ningxia, China. As of 2021, it administers Funing Community (福宁社区) and the following six villages:

- Funing Village (福宁村)
- Mulan Village (木兰村)
- Wuhe Village (武河村)
- Yuanyi Village (园艺村)
- Yuhai Village (玉海村)
- Yuanlong Village (原隆村)

Minning, which literally means "Fujian–Ningxia", was named by Xi Jinping in 1997, then deputy secretary of the Fujian Provincial Party Committee and the leader of the Fujian-Ningxia poverty-alleviation leading group. The town was officially established in 2001 after its population swelled to 14,000. Most of its residents are resettled farmers from Xihaigu in southern Ningxia, one of the poorest places in China and a main target of the government's poverty-alleviation resettlement program.

The 2021 TV series Minning Town is based on the history of this town. It depicts poverty alleviation efforts. Starring Huang Xuan, Zu Feng, Rayzha Alimjan, Zhang Jiayi, Huang Yao, Bai Yufan, Guo Jingfei, You Yongzhi, Yao Chen, Huang Jue, Tao Hong, Yan Ni with Wang Kai and Bai Yu, the show was a huge critical success and described as "a new standard for Chinese dramas". It won Best Television Series and three other awards at the 2021 Shanghai Television Festival. It is one of the CGTN shows most popular with foreign audiences, particularly in the Arab countries.

NCPA commissioned an opera of the same name premiered September 2022.
