= Kek Lok Si Charitable Hospital =

Hospital in Penang, Malaysia

- Kek Lok Si
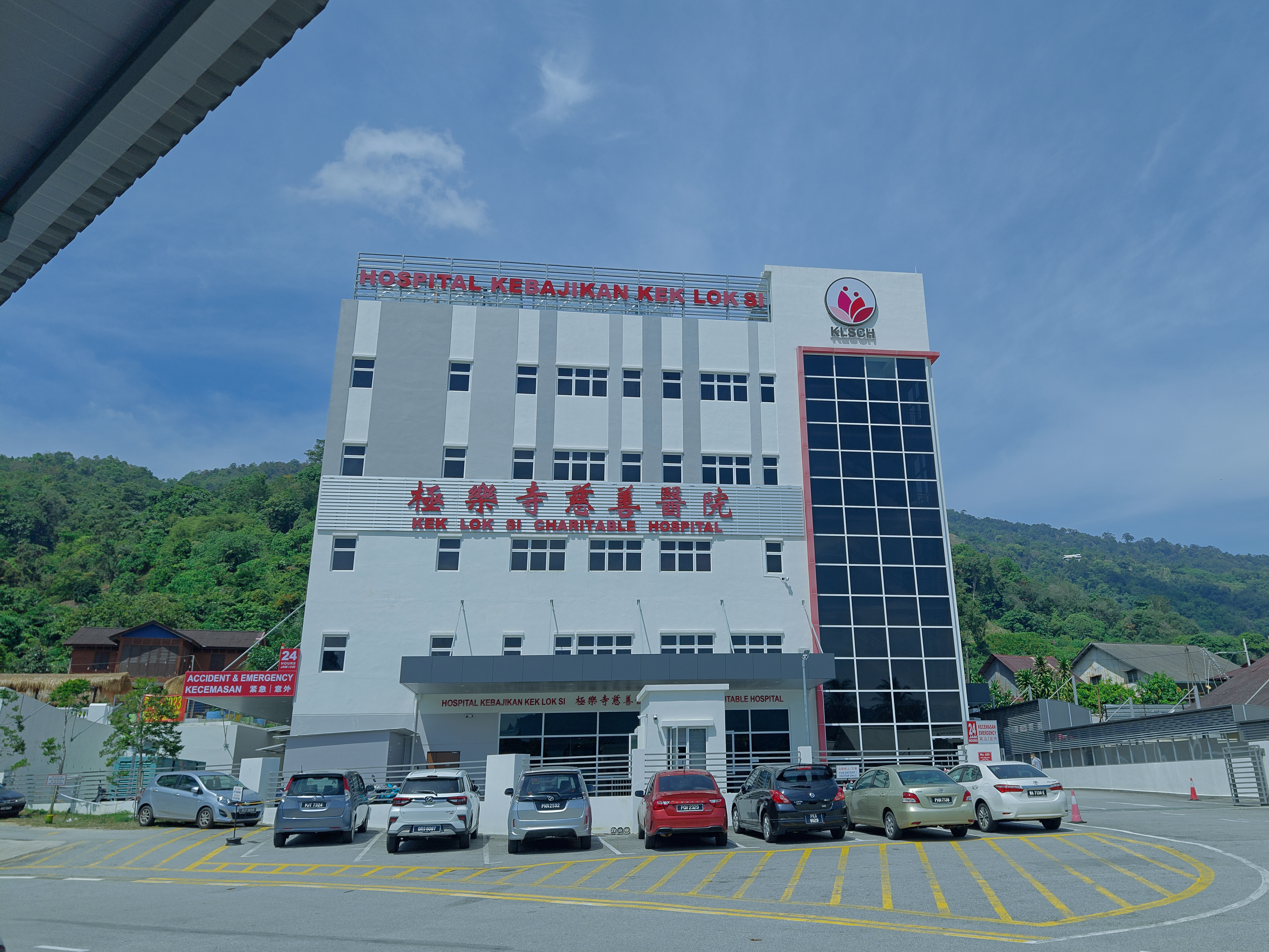

Geography
- Location: 623, Jalan Balik Pulau, 11500 Ayer Itam, George Town, Penang, Malaysia
- Coordinates: 5.401637°N 100.275705°E

Services
- Emergency department: Yes
- Beds: 50

History
- Founded: 2021

Links
- Website: www.klsch.my

Kek Lok Si Charitable Hospital is a non-profit hospital in George Town within the Malaysian state of Penang. Established in 2021, the 50-bed hospital at Ayer Itam is the first Buddhist hospital in the state and is run by the nearby Kek Lok Si Temple. The hospital provides services including internal medicine, orthopaedics, otorhinolaryngology, radiology, anesthesiology, nephrology, medical diagnostics, general surgery and hemodialysis.

First proposed as a "charitable hospital" for lower-income groups, the medical centre has maintained a policy against medical tourism, in contrast to other healthcare establishments in Penang. Plans for its construction had been submitted to the Penang Island City Council in 2014. Upon its opening, the hospital was also equipped with six hemodialysis machines and two operation theatres. As an extension of the existing non-profit centre, a proposed 400-bed hospital at Paya Terubong was announced in 2023.

== See also ==
- List of hospitals in Malaysia
