= Museles =

Wine produced in Xinjiang, China

Museles is a wine produced in Xinjiang, China. It is commonly made for local consumption, but is now also produced commercially for export outside the region.

== History ==
China's Xinjiang Autonomous Region have an ancient history of viticulture going back to around the 4th century BC, when Greek settlers brought the vine and more advanced irrigation techniques. The area around Turfan was, and still is, particularly noted for its grape production, and its production of grape wines is mentioned in the historical record as well. Its wine was noted during the Tang dynasty, Marco Polo also mentioned that Carachoco (the name he used for Turfan) produced fine grape wines. The modern wine industry is largely patterned after French methods, with a concentration on varieties like Cabernet. However, the Uighur traditional technique has survived, especially in counties surrounding Kashgar.

== Production ==
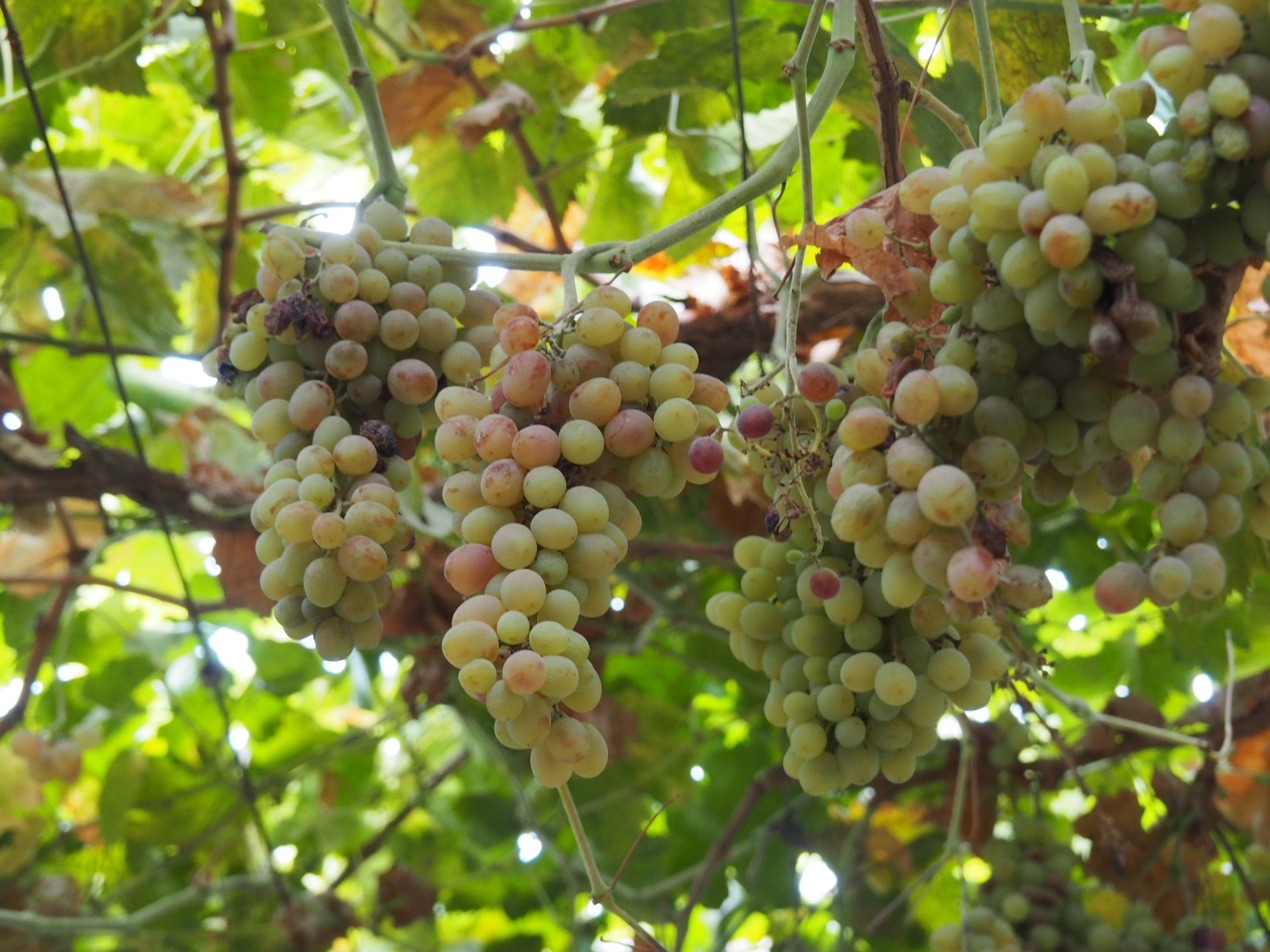
Grapes in Turpan

The Uighur home-made wine generally called "museles" (from Arabic "المثلث", meaning "the triangle") is still being brewed by households in many villages. Unlike wines west of Xinjiang, the brewing of museles requires crushing of local varieties of grapes by hand, then strained using the Uighur atlas silk, then boiled with an amount of water equal to the juice and desired portion of sugar, until the volume of the mixture is down to the original volume of the juice, then stored in clay urns together with folk recipes varying by localities---in some counties, traditional Uighur herbal medicines, and goji, mulberries, sea-buckthorn, cloves, etc. in others, and even raw and unfeathered pheasants or poussins in others.

The brew usually takes more than a month to accomplish. It is then un-urned, filtered and bottled to be stored for long periods. In some villages, the ritual of communally gathering a mixture of folk museles brews in a large village urn marks the occasion following the harvest and process of grapes.

Museles is now being standardized by the wine producing industry in China and marketed under the brand-name of Merceles.
