= Cheong Fatt Tze Mansion =

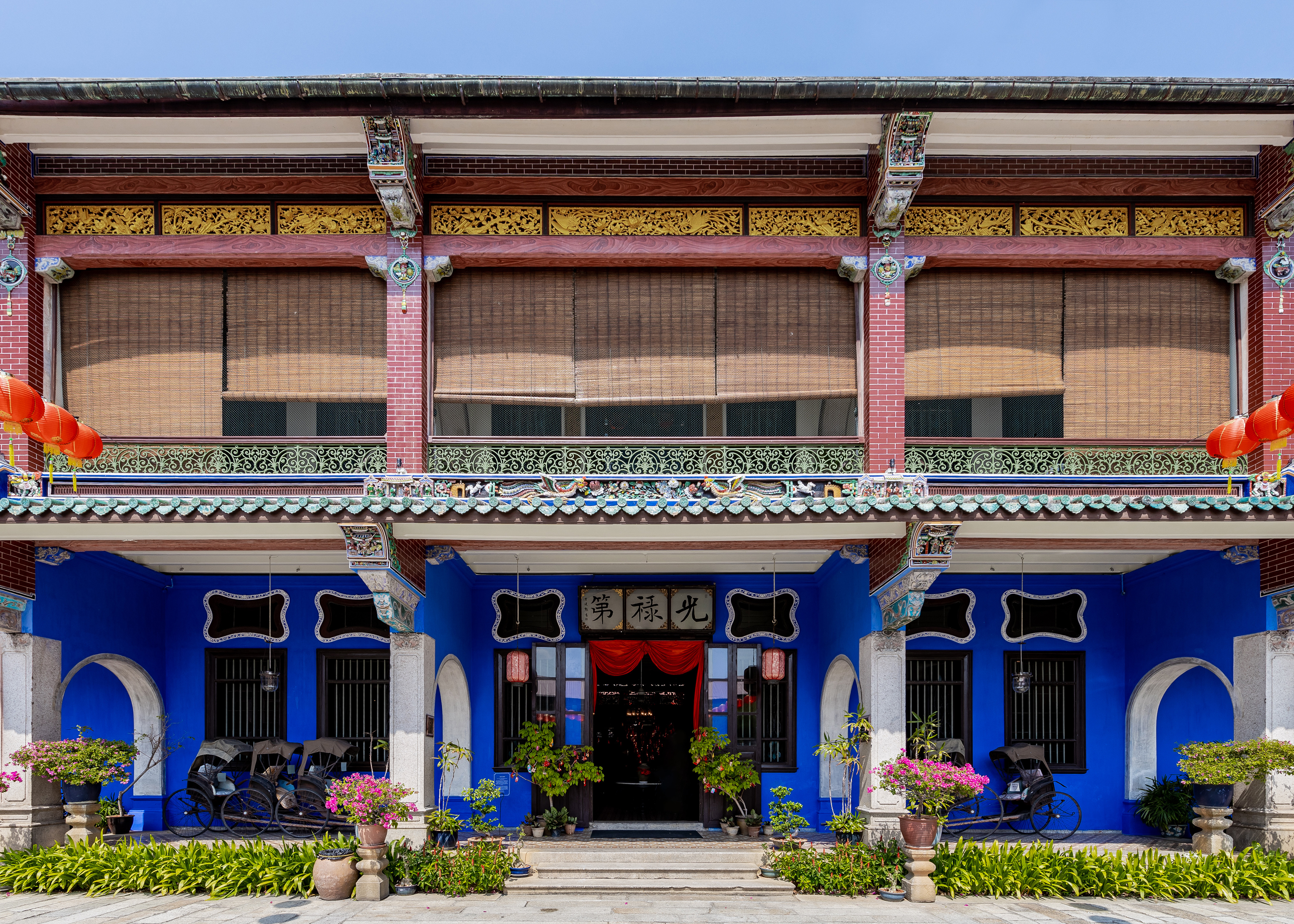

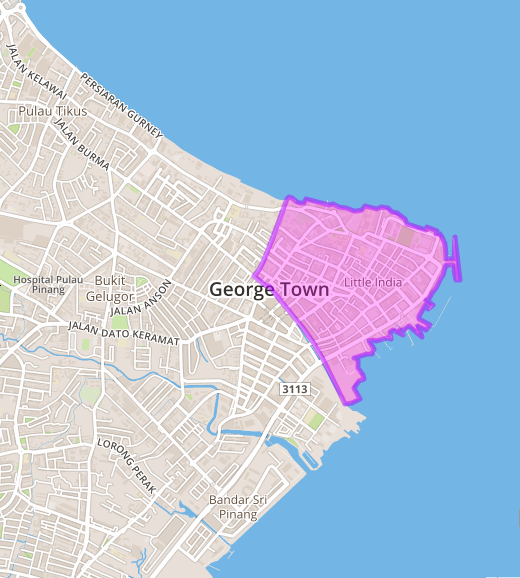
- Location within central George Town, Penang

General information
- Type: Boutique hotel
- Architectural style: Straits Chinese Eclectic
- Location: 14 Leith Street, 10200 George Town, Penang, Malaysia, George Town, Penang, Malaysia
- Coordinates: 5.421408°N 100.334947°E
- Groundbreaking: 1897; 129 years ago
- Completed: 1904; 122 years ago
- Renovated: 1995

Technical details
- Floor count: 2

Website
- cheongfatttzemansion.com

UNESCO World Heritage Site
- Type: Cultural
- Criteria: ii, iii, iv
- Designated: 2008 (32nd session)
- Reference no.: 1223
- Region: Asia-Pacific

The Cheong Fatt Tze Mansion is a government gazetted heritage building located on Leith Street in George Town, Penang, Malaysia. The mansion's external decorations and indigo-blue outer walls make it a very distinctive building, and it is sometimes referred to as The Blue Mansion. Built by the merchant Cheong Fatt Tze at the end of the 19th century, the mansion has 38 rooms, 5 granite-paved courtyards, 7 staircases and 220 vernacular timber louvre windows. It served as Cheong's private residence as well as the seat of his business activities in Penang.

The mansion is eclectic, but mainly reflects Chinese architectural styles of the Imperial Period with some European elements such as louvered windows and metal balustrades. Features of the house include Gothic louvred windows, Chinese cut and paste porcelain work, Stoke-on-Trent floor tiles made of encaustic clay in geometric pieces all shaped to fit to a perfect square, Glasgow cast iron works by MacFarlane's & Co. and Art Nouveau stained glass windows.

The mansion was originally built with careful attention to the principles of Feng Shui. The domestic annexe is built in front of it to prevent any road being built to create a T-junction in front of it; it has water running through a meandering network of pipes that begin from the eaves of the roof, channelled through the upper ceiling, down the walls collecting in the central courtyard before being channelled away from the property via a similar network of pipes, in this case, underneath the entire flooring system and is built with a step in the middle to create a slope (to ride on the dragon's back). The distinctive blue colour of the mansion is the result of mixing lime with natural blue dye made from the indigo plant. The blue was very popular in the Colonial period and the dye was imported from India to Penang by the British. The lime-wash was very effective in a tropical weather as it absorbed moisture and cooled the house whilst dispelling moisture without damage to the structural integrity of the walls. Though white was the most easily available colour, the indigo-blue was chosen because it was highly prized by all communities, adding stature to the mansion.

The mansion was purchased from Cheong Fatt Tze's descendants in 1989 by a group of local Penang individuals to save the edifice from encroaching development and possible demolition. The property operates as an 18 Room Hotel-cum-museum as part of the adaptive reuse of an ongoing restoration project which has won awards from UNESCO. Tours are offered in English two times a day to central parts of the house. In 2016, a restaurant called 'Indigo' opened on the first floor of the mansion. The mansion has been featured in various films including the 1993 Oscar-winning French film Indochine starring Catherine Deneuve, The Red Kebaya, Road to Dawn, 3rd Generation and the critically acclaimed The Blue Mansion in 2009 by Singapore director Glen Goei of Forever Fever fame. The mansion has also been featured in programs broadcast on various international television channels (CNN, BCC, The History Channel, Discovery Travel & Living). Most recently the mansion served as one of the locations for the Hollywood blockbuster Crazy Rich Asians.

The current Managing Director of the mansion is Shen Loh-Lim. Its Executive Chef is Jack Yeap.

== Awards ==
- 1995 Malaysian National Architectural Award For Conservation
- 2000 UNESCO 'Most Excellent' Heritage Conservation Award
- 'Best Tourist Attraction 2003' Merit Award - Malaysian Ministry of Culture, Arts & Tourism
- ASEANTA 2004 Excellence Award; ASEAN Cultural Preservation Effort
- Featured in Hip Hotels of the Orient - TASCHEN
- Best Boutique Hotel 2008 - Best of Malaysia Travel Awards by Expatriate Lifestyle\

== See also ==
- Tjong A Fie Mansion
