= Chung Hwa Confucian High School =

School in Penang, Malaysia

Chung Hwa Confucian National Type Chinese High School
- 孔圣庙中华国民型华文中学
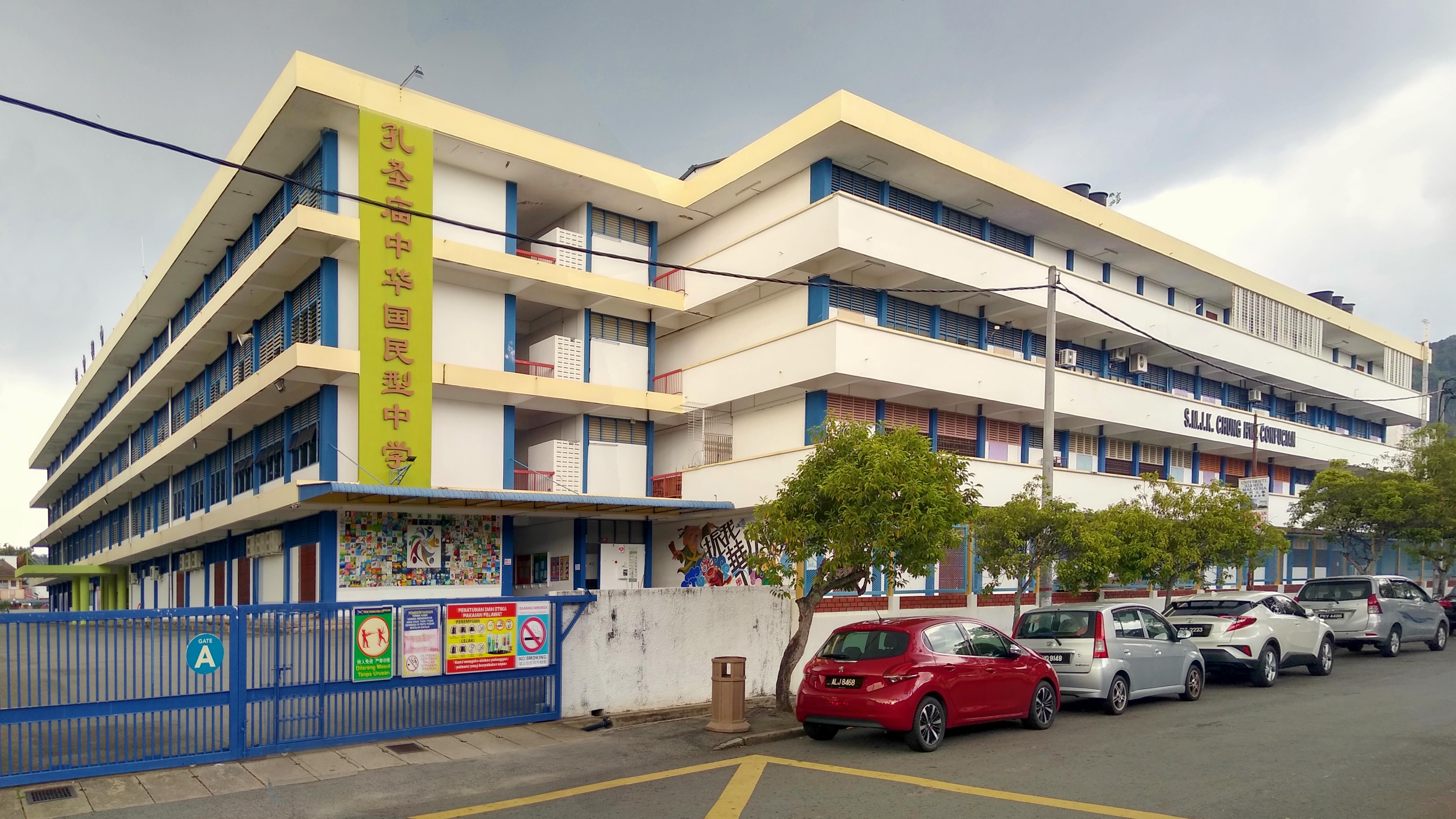
- Chung Hwa Confucian High School in May 2022

Location
- 2, Persiaran Tembaga, Georgetown, Penang, 11600; Malaysia
- 5.3908°N 100.3010°E

Information
- School type: National-type Chinese secondary school
- Motto: 敬诚勤朴 (Respect, Sincerity, Diligence, Moderation)
- Founded: 1904
- Founder: Cheong Fatt Tze
- School code: PEB1095
- Principal: Yeoh Lye Hock 杨来福
- Teaching staff: 140
- Grades: From 1-6
- Gender: Mixed
- Age range: 13-20
- Enrollment: 2,000
- Website: chchs.edu.my

Chung Hwa Confucian National Type Chinese High School
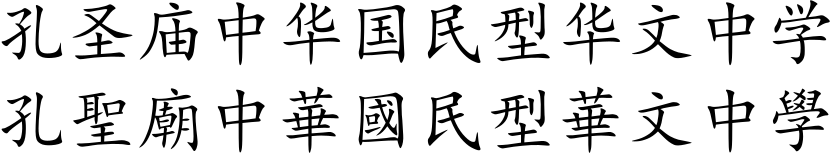
- Chung Hwa Confucian National Type Chinese High School in Simplified Chinese (top) and Traditional Chinese character (below)
- Traditional Chinese: 孔聖廟中華國民型華文中學
- Simplified Chinese: 孔圣庙中华国民型华文中学
Transcriptions
Standard Mandarin
- Hanyu Pinyin: Kǒngshèngmiào Zhōnghuá Guómínxíng Huáwén Zhōngxué
Southern Min
- Hokkien POJ: Khong Chèng Biō Tiong-hua Kok-bîn-hêng Hua-bûn Tiong-hak

Chung Hwa Confucian High School, officially the Chung Hwa Confucian National Type Chinese High School (Chinese: 孔圣庙中华国民型华文中学) is a national-type chinese secondary school located in Green Lane, Penang, Malaysia. The school is one of 11 National-type Chinese secondary school in Penang.

It is the only overseas Chinese school that had been sanctioned by the Qing dynasty government of China, which officially presented it with royal seals bearing the school's name through its consulate and local businessman Cheong Fatt Tze, who is also credited with being the founder of the school.

Chung Hwa Confucian High School is known as the oldest Chinese school in Malaysia.

== History ==
The school was founded in 1904 and it is the first school in Southeast Asia to have used Mandarin as a medium of teaching students.

Cheong Fatt Tze was worried that new generations of Chinese might eventually forget their mother tongue and their own culture. He therefore donated funds to build Chung Hwa School (1904) in Penang and Ying Sin School (1905) in Singapore. These schools were the oldest formal Chinese schools established in South-east Asia as a result of influence by the educational reforms in China in the early 1900s. Mandarin is the school's medium of instruction.

It is also the only Chinese school outside of China that had been accredited by the Qing dynasty, which presented it to Mr. Cheong Fatt Tze. He was the founder of this school. Cheong Fatt Tze led a team of Qing dynasty officers in their mission to construct the Chung Hwa Confucian School. They raised a big sum of money and founded the school.

In its early years, Chung Hwa Confucian School was situated in the Ping Zheng Association building (now known as the Penang Chinese Town Hall) that was located in Jalan Masjid Kaptian Keling (formerly Pitt Street). Initially, the school had only an enrolment of 160 students and eight teachers, and classes were only conducted at primary level. The administration of the school came under the patronage of the school's board of governors. In 1908, the school moved to Maxwell Road (currently the site of Komtar Tower) in George Town.

In 1912, the Republican overthrew the Qing dynasty government and took over the administration of China. In the same year, the Confucian Association known as the Confucian Temple allocated funds to sponsor the school, which came under the patronage of the temple and the term "Confucian" became part of the name of the school. The school was then renamed to Chung Hwa Confucian School. In 1913, the board of directors was founded and the first sports day was held. This was a significant achievement.

Lower secondary classes were started at Chung Hwa Confucian School in 1924. The school enrolment increased to 900 pupils. In 1941, during World War II, when the Japanese occupied Malaya, the school was used as a centre of teaching the Japanese language. On 7 May 1956, the school attempted to set up a secondary school but failed because it was rejected by the then Education Ministry. In 1958, Chung Hwa Confucian School received financial help from the Education Ministry of the Federation of Malaya, and at that time the school was split into two schools, namely Chung Hwa Confucian Primary School and Chung Hwa Confucian High School.

A year after independence was declared in Malaya, in 1958, Chung Hwa Confucian Primary School became a government-aided school, which is known as a national-type primary school. Meanwhile, Chung Hwa Confucian Secondary School remained under the administration of the school's board of governors.

By 1970, the building that was occupied by both Chung Hwa Confucian schools had become overcrowded, and therefore a fund-raising drive was set to raise money to buy a piece of land for a new building. Within a few weeks, the funds were collected, and the school's board of directors bought a piece of land in Green Lane. Construction began immediately. In 1971, Chung Hwa Confucian High School's four-storey new building was completed. In 1972, the whole school shifted to the current site, which is located within Pesiaran Tembaga and Tingkat Tembaga. The primary school remained at Maxwell Road (now Jalan Dr. Lim Chwee Leong).

In 1973, the first batch of students sat for the MCE examinations. By this time SMJK Chung Hwa Confucian had become a modern, advanced and fully equipped school. In 1975, Chung Hwa Confucian Primary School was split into two schools, which are SJK(C) Chung Hwa Confucian A and B. In 1976, The Science and Technology Building of SMJK Chung Hwa Confucian was completed. In 1980, the state government claimed the land in Maxwell Road for the construction of Komtar Tower. Therefore, both Chung Hwa Confucian Primary Schools have to be moved to Jalan Ibbetson, which is beside the Penang State Mosque.

In 1985, the new building with 12 classrooms and two science labs was completed. In 1994, an extra building with nine classrooms and a library was completed in the school in conjunction with its 90th anniversary. In the 1990s, the board of directors decided to change the school to a co-ed school and Form 6 classes (pre-university studies) were also established. Currently, Chung Hwa Confucian High School has 2,000 students and 140 teaching staff.

In 2004, the school celebrated its 100th anniversary and being the only few Chinese schools to have received 100 years of establishment. A grand dinner and exhibition were held in the main hall of SMJK Chung Hwa Confucian. In 2010, a new canteen and a new block consisting of nine classrooms for Form-6 classes and the school's resource centre was completed.

== The campus ==
=== Main Blocks ===
Completed in 1972, it consists of 19 classrooms, the school's 2 meeting rooms, 3 science labs, a computer room, a teacher's office and a store room.

=== School Hall Blockckock ===
The school hall, which consists of 5 badminton courts and could accommodate 2000 people is located here. Other facilities are the school administration office, the main teacher's office, a canteen and a book store. Co-curriculum societies' rooms and closets are also found in this block.

=== STEM Block ===
Science and Technology block was constructed in 1976, most of the school's facilities are housed here. They include the Auditorium Room, Electrical Room, Living Skills Workshop, School Band Room, Art Room, Technical Drawing Room, Physics Lab, Biology Lab, Chemistry Lab, and Computer Room. Now, renamed to STEM (Science, Technology, Engineering & Mathematics) Block.

=== 1985 New Blocks ===
Completed in 1985, it consists of 12 classrooms, 2 science labs, also an block dedicated for form 3 students

=== 1994 New Blocks ===
Completed in 1994, it consists of 9 classrooms and a library.

=== Canteen and Form 6 Blocks ===
Completed in 2010, it consists of the new canteen, classrooms, the school's resource centre.

== Location ==
SMJK Chung Hwa Confucian is situated inside the residential area of Jalan Tembaga in Green Lane. Its location is in 2, Pesiaran Tembaga. It is connected to Jalan Masjid Negeri and the Penang Bridge and the township of Batu Lanchang are situated nearby.

== Achievements ==
Anugerah Sekolah Terbaik Sijil Tinggi Persekolahan Malaysia (STPM) 2016.
