= Cabernet Gernischt =

Variety of grape

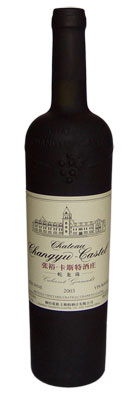
Changyu-Castel 2003 Cabernet Gernischt

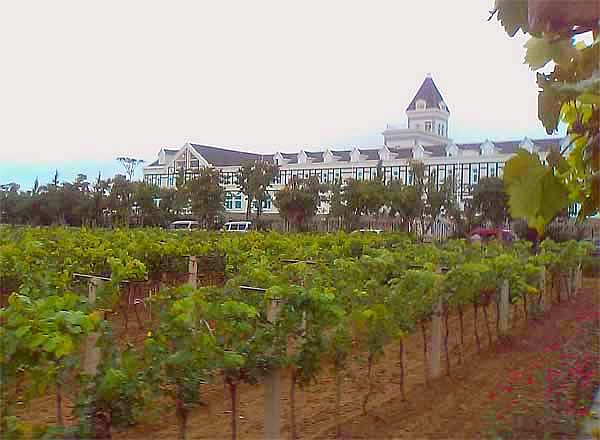
Chateau Changyu, Beiyujia Vineyards

Cabernet Gernischt is the name given to a red wine grape variety used in China. Originally believed to be of European origin, and similar if not identical to Cabernet Franc, Cabernet Gernischt has since been proven to be genetically identical to Carménère.

== Name ==
It was believed that the name is derived from the now-lost European Cabernet Gemischt grape, whose name at some point was changed to Cabernet Gernischt (either by intent or by misspelling). The vine was mistakenly called "mixed cabernet" (German: "gemischt") when it arrived in China.

According to a story, one of the many Shanghai-based Jewish traders bought cuttings of the vine and named it "Cabernet gernischt", a play on the Yiddish word gornischt, which taken together would mean "no Cabernet at all".

== History ==
The history of the grape dates back to the late 19th century when the Phylloxera epidemic destroyed most of the European vineyards, most notably in France. It was believed that one of the varieties lost to the European vineyards was the Cabernet Gemischt grape, an ancestor of today's Cabernet Franc. The grape variety was introduced into the Shandong region of China in 1892 by Zhangyu Winery (or Changyu Pioneer Wine Company).

DNA profiling carried out by grape geneticist José Vouillamoz (co-author of Wine Grapes) confirms Gernischt's relationship to two classic Bordeaux varieties, Cabernet Sauvignon and Cabernet Franc, but shows it is, in fact, Carménère. This explains the gamey notes and aromas of green bell pepper that mark out Cabernet Gernischt wines; these are also notably similar to Carménère of Chile.
