= Emma Gao =

Chinese oenologist

- 高源
- Born: 1978 (age 47–48); Yinchuan, Ningxia, China
- Occupation: Winemaker
- Employer: Silver Heights Vineyard

Emma Gao (Chinese: 高源; pinyin: Gāo Yuán; born 1978) is a Chinese oenologist, who is the chief winemaker at Silver Heights winery, one of China's most prestigious vineyards.

== Biography ==
Gao was born in Yinchuan, Ningxia. After studying literature, she and her father, Gao Lin, moved to Russia in the late 1980s, where she studied economic agriculture at Leningrad State University. Shortly after, her father, also a winemaker, spent several weeks in France and upon his return, he encouraged his daughter to pursue the same craft. This decision coincided with the Chinese government's efforts to establish a wine region in Ningxia's Helan Mountains, with Gao helping in the family business, which produced Ningxia wine.

Gao moved to France in 1999, aged 21, to study oenology at the University of Bordeaux, where she was awarded a Diplôme national d'œnologue, as the first Chinese woman to achieve this. Between 2000 and 2002, she trained at Château Gerbaud in Saint-Émilion, Château Calon-Ségu in Saint-Estèphe, the Oenology Laboratory of Lamarque and Château Gloria. At Château Calon-Ségur, she met her future husband, Thierry Courtade, with whom he had a daughter, Emma. After working at Domaine d’Eyssac for a year, Gao returned to China in 2004, first working at a winery in Xinjiang, then working in wine sales in Shanghai. In 2007 she and her father founded Silver Heights winery on land he was already cultivating in Ningxia.

By 2018 Silver Heights had become known as a "leading boutique winery". Gao's first vintage as chief winemaker was praised by Chinese and international winemakers, and two of her red wines are among the best known produced in China. They are a Cabernet Sauvignon ‘Emma’s Reserve’ and a Bordeaux blend ‘The Summit’. Dubbed a 'micro-vineyard' Silver Heights produces 40,000 bottles of wine each year. In 2017 Gao began to convert their winemaking processes to purely biodynamic ones. In 2020 the company made its first exports to the UK, US, Singapore, Belgium, Denmark and Italy. Pioneer of Chinese wine, Gérard Colin, stated that Gao is "considered the best winemaker, with practically the best wine, in all of China".

Gao has spoken out about how the climate crisis is affecting wine production, in particular causing damage to the vines due to increasingly harsh winters.
