= Tye Kee Yoon =

Chinese Vice Consul (1849–1919)

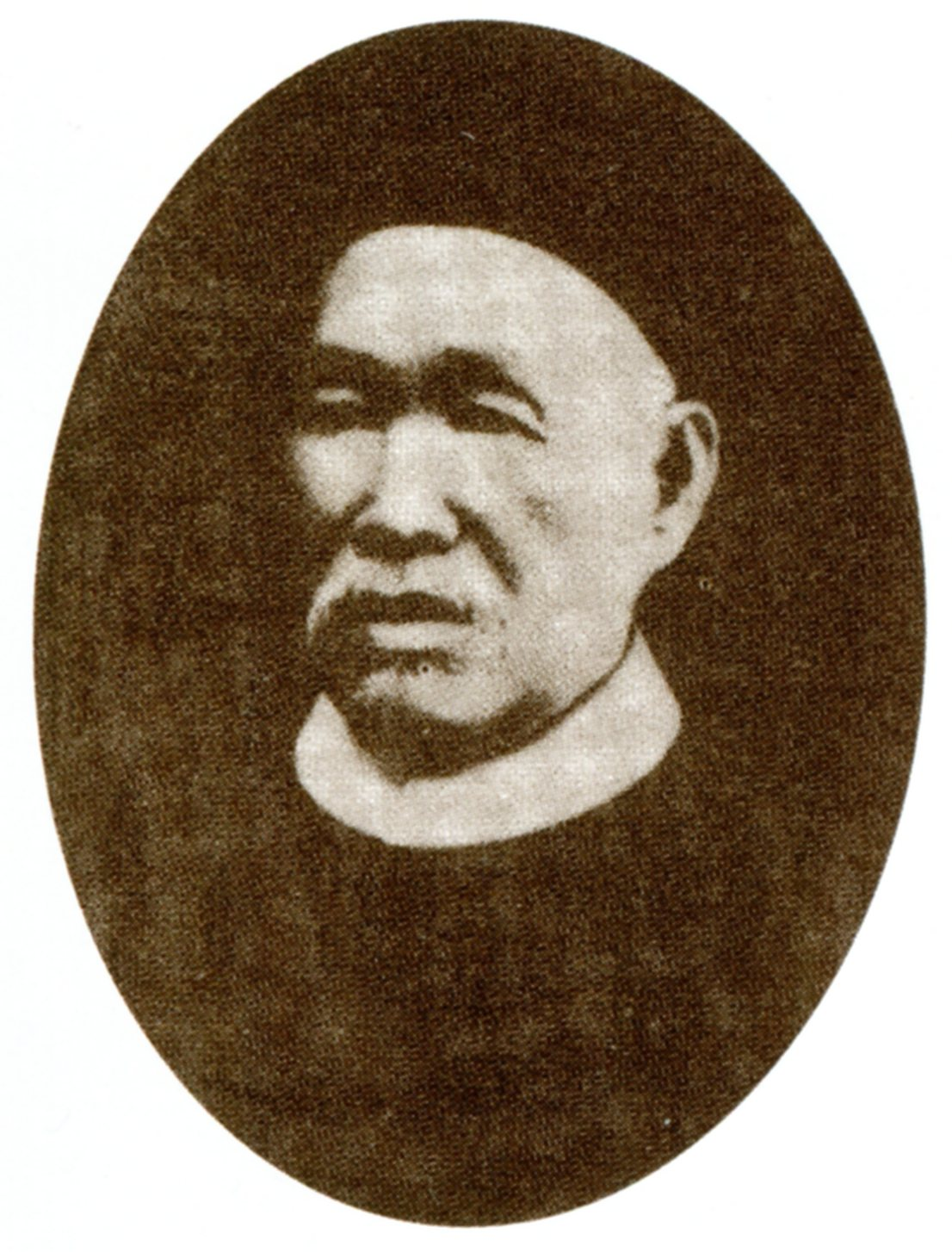

Tye Kee Yoon (Chinese: 戴喜云; pinyin: Dài Xǐyún; 1849–1919) was a Vice Consul of Qing dynasty China in Penang, one of the founders and 'Five Great Sponsors,' of the Kek Lok Si owned property in Perak, and was proprietor of a business named Chop Hen Choong Toong. He arrived at Penang, a penniless coolie from China, in 1873, but by December 1907, had risen to the prominent position of diplomat. Success and recognition followed that appointment. He became a Revenue Farmer, and succeeded in obtaining the Gambling Farm for Taiping (Perak), the following year. In 1910 he was appointed to the Committee of the District Hospital, Penang. Disaster soon followed success beginning with the death of his wife, Khoo Lye Neoh on Sunday 6 April 1913 and later that year, on Friday 14 November, of his daughter, Siew Kee Tye, the wife of Khoo Chye Hean.

He was Chinese Vice Consul in Penang between 1907 and 1911, an Acting Consul-General of Singapore from 1911 to 1912, toward the end of the Qing dynasty and a philanthropist of Lebuh Tye Kee Yoon fame. He was one of the largest individual town-property holders in the state.

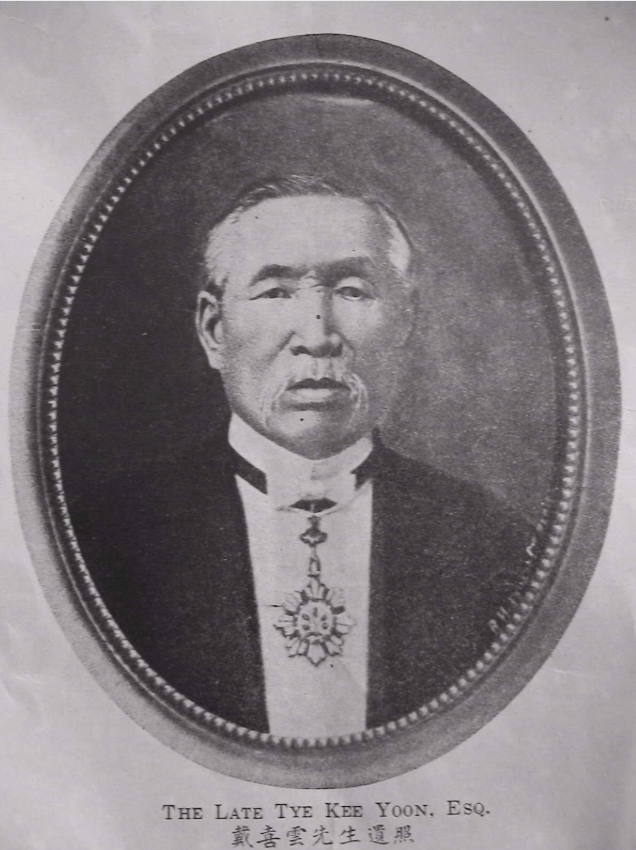
Tye Kee Yoon, date unknown

He contributed handsome donations to schools, hospitals, temples and many other philanthropic establishments, among which are the King Edward Memorial Hospital, the Adventist Hospital, the Penang Free School, the Chung Hwa Confucian School and the Kek Lok Si Temple. He contributed to the Malayan Aircraft Fund during the First World War.

The Shih Chung School premises which was, at one time, known as "The Chinese Residency," belonged to Tye Kee Yoon, who used it for China's Consulate in Penang.

His other well-known property was on Leith Street.

He died in Penang in 1919 at the age of 71. According to newspaper reports, after his death, Tye Kee Yoon was regarded as the richest man in Penang at the time of his demise. Upon his death, Tye Kee Yoon's son, Tye Phey Yuen, also known as Tye Shook Yuen, succeeded him as Chinese Consul at Penang, appointed to that position by Dr. Sun Yat Sen.
