= Changyu =

Chinese winery

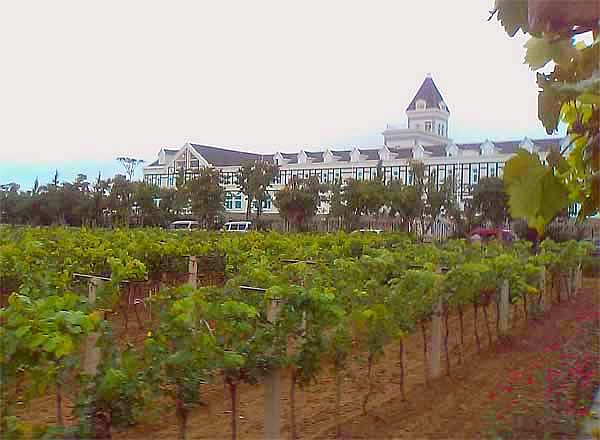
Modern day Chateau Changyu, Yantai, Shandong Province

Changyu Pioneer Wine Co. Inc., located in Yantai, Shandong, is China's oldest and largest winery. It was founded in 1892 by Cheong Fatt Tze (Zhang Bishi).

== History ==
Zhang Bishi established the winery in Yantai in 1892. He bought 2,000 plants from the United States, but few bore fruit and were not sweet enough. As well, half of the vines rotted away before harvest, so he bought 640,000 more from Europe. Even these plants found difficulty growing in the foreign Chinese soil that only 20 to 30% of them survived.

In order to save the venture, Zhang sent for and brought back wild plants from northeast China, plants that produced a bitter fruit. They were grafted to the foreign plants and, after three years, they were planted in the Shandong vineyards. The new vines survived, granting fruit rich in sugar with good color and were insect, disease, and cold resistant.

Zhang Bishi's nephew Zhang Chengqing was the company's first general manager.

== The Grand Cellar ==
The Grand Cellar was first built in 1894. Although it needed to be rebuilt three times in the first 11 years, it has lasted for more than 100 years.

The Grand Cellar is 1,976 square metres in size and seven metres in depth. The ground of the cellar is one metre below sea level and the whole of the cellar is no more than 100 metres away from the sea. It maintains a constant temperature and humidity throughout the year and is ideal for wine maturation. Still in use today, thousands of oak barrels arranged around the cellar, with three of them large enough to store 15 tonnes of wine each.

== Wineries ==
- Chateau Changyu-Castel – Located at the Beiyujia Village of the Yantai Economic and Technical Development Zone, Chateau Changyu-Castel has a total are 135 hectares of vineyards and large wine-making chateau. Following the traditional European chateau style, the design of the square, the interior decoration and the wine tasting room was made byMicel Mirande, a member of the French Architecture Association. The primary grape variety is Cabernet Gernischt, introduced from Europe over 100 years ago.
- Chateau Changyu-AFIP – Located just to the northeast of Beijing, Chateau Changyu-AFIP is Changyu's newest chateau and is regarded by the OIV as the 'new model of global chateau'.
- Golden Icewine Valley – The area around Hanlong Lake in Liaoning is recognized as "golden ice wine valley" or "eastern Ontario". Currently, there are more than 5,000 hectares of ice wine vineyard at an altitude of 380 meters. The adjacent lake ensures that the weather is cold, but not too dry. The primary grape variety is Vidal, introduced by Aurora, a Canadian wine company.
- Chateau Changyu–Moser XV – Located near Yinchuan in the Ningxia wine region, Chateau Changyu Moser XV is a complex chateau. In March 2013, UK royal wine dealer Berry Brothers & Rudd listed the Changyu Moser XV wines, making Moser XV the first Chinese chateau that has entered into European market. Chateau Changyu Moser XV is the cooperation between Changyu and Lenz M. Moser.
- Chateau Changyu Baron Balboa – Named after the company's first wine maker - Baron Balboa, Xinjiang Chateau Changyu Baron Balboa lies in Nanshan New District, Shihezi City. It is a large-scale modern chateau serving for grape cultivating, wine making and sales, culture communication and tourism. The unique gobi gravel soil and sunshine comparable with Bordeaux in the region allow the chateau to produce 13.5 degree wine every year.
- Chateau Changyu Reina – Named after the Reina family, its brewing technology partner and a historic Italian wine making family, Shaanxi Chateau Changyu Verna is located in Weicheng district of Xianyang City. Augustus, a descendant of the family, serves as Chief Enologist of the chateau. With unique "changing-barrel" technology, the wine stored in barrels from over 20 different origins and in different degree of roasting are in the optimal balance.
- Changyu Kely – Located in New Zealand.
