= Ningxia wine =

Wine produced in the Ningxia province of China

Ningxia
- Wine region
- Country: China
- Location: Eastern base of the Helan Mountains, Ningxia
- Soil conditions: Sandy and loamy soils
- Grapes produced: Cabernet Sauvignon, Merlot, Chardonnay, Riesling
- No. of wineries: Over 100 (as of 2016)

A Ningxia wine is any wine produced in the Chinese autonomous region of Ningxia (Chinese: 宁夏; pronounced [nǐŋɕjâ]). Since large producers moved into the region in the 1980s and local producer successes at wine competitions in the 2010s spurred further development, Ningxia has become one of the premier wine regions in China.

== History ==
Wine grapes have been grown in the area since 1982, when large Chinese wine producers such as Changyu and Great Wall established vineyards in the region. At that time, little wine was vinified in the region; rather, the grapes were shipped to more developed regions to be turned into wine. In the late 1990s, the Ningxia Agricultural Reclamation Management Bureau began a concerted effort to turn once arid land between the Yellow River and the Helan Mountain foothills into a potential site for vineyard development.

From the mid 2000s onwards, Ningxia saw a steady increase in quality wine production, with international wine brands such as Pernod Ricard and LVMH investing in the area. Several boutique, Chinese-owned wineries also began operations in this period, including Helan Qingxue Winery and Silver Heights Vineyard.

In London in September 2011, the Decanter Red Bordeaux Varietal Over £10 International Trophy went to a 2009 Bordeaux blend from Ningxia autonomous region called Jiabeilan from Helan Qingxue winery. The same winery also won a silver medal for its Classic Chardonnay 2008 and a bronze for its Premium Collection Riesling. The winemaker was Li Demei, a wine consultant to six Chinese wineries and a lecturer at the Beijing University of Agriculture. He completed his studies at Enita de Bordeaux in 2001. Following Helan Qingxue's surprise win at the Decanter Worldwide Wine Awards in 2011, Ningxia has seen an explosion of winery development. One unique viticultural feature of the region is the use of sand and earth to bury the vines in the winter, a labor-intensive practice necessary to protect the vines against the cold and dry months from November through March.

On 14 December 2011 in Beijing, in a competition tagged "Bordeaux against Ningxia", experts from China and France tasted five wines from each region. Ningxia was the clear winner with four out of five of the top wines. Wine experts have praised the quality of the top Ningxia wines, assessing the region have a strong potential for wine production, with the local climate and geography being well suited for growing wine grapes.

=== Plans for expansion ===
In the 21st century, Chinese authorities gave approval to the development of the eastern base of the Helan Mountains in Ningxia Hui autonomous region as an area for wine production. Several large Chinese wine companies including Changyu and Dynasty Wine have begun development in the western region of the autonomous region. Together they own 20,000 acres of land for wine plantations, while Dynasty has invested 100 million yuan into Ningxia. In addition, the major oil company China Petroleum and Chemical Corporation has founded a grape plantation near the Helan Mountains. The household appliance company Midea has also begun participating in Ningxia's wine industry.

Since the early 2010s, winemaking in Ningxia has grown quickly in size and reputation. The area of land with planted vines in Ningxia increased from 2,660 hectares in 2004 to 39,300 hectares in 2014. As of late 2016, Ningxia has 100 operational wineries with 80 more under construction and 50 further in the planning stages.

In 2013, LVMH opened its winery 'Domaine Chandon China' in Ningxia.

According to data from British consulting firm International Wine and Spirit Research, China's wine consumption has doubled over the past five years and is currently the world's seventh-largest consumer in terms of volume. It is expected to become the world's top wine consumer within the next 20 years.

=== Climate crisis ===
Winemaker Emma Gao has spoken out about how the climate crisis is affecting wine production, in particular causing damage to the vines due increasingly harsh winters.
