= Cheong Fatt Tze =

Qing Dynasty politician

- 張弼士
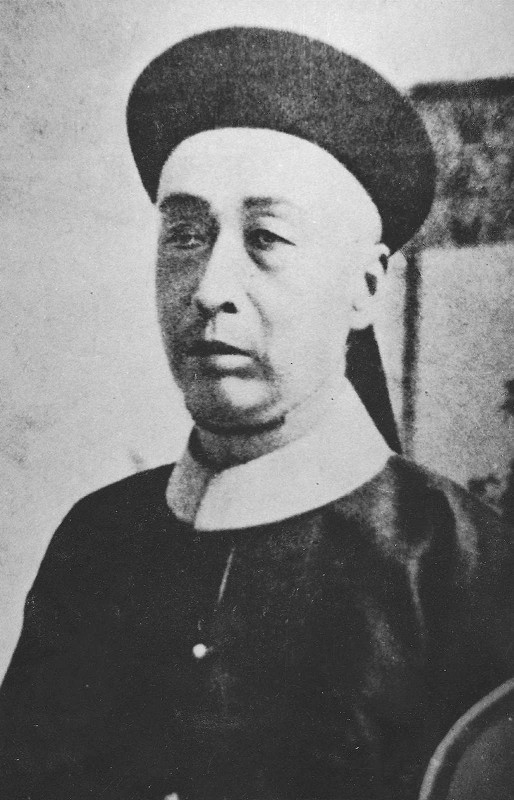
- Born: Chang Chin Hsun c. 1840; Dabu, Guangdong, China
- Died: 1916 (aged 75–76); Batavia, Dutch East Indies
- Burial place: China
- Occupations: Industrialist, politician and philanthropist
- Spouse: 8
- Children: 14

Cheong Fatt Tze

Chinese name
- Traditional Chinese: 張弼士
- Hanyu Pinyin: Zhāng Bìshì
- Pha̍k-fa-sṳ: Chông Phi̍t-su
- Jyutping: Zoeng1 Bat6 Si6
- Hokkien POJ: Tiuⁿ Pi̍t-sū

Cheong Fatt Tze (born Chang Chin Hsun; c. 1840–1916), also known as Tjong Tjen Hsoen, Thio Tiauw Siat or Zhang Bishi was a Chinese industrialist, politician and philanthropist. Spending the majority of his life residing in Malaya and the Dutch East Indies, he was a powerful Nanyang business magnate and a first-class Mandarin of China; he was made Consul-General in Singapore and economic advisor. He was once regarded as the richest man in Malaya, with a reputed net worth of 80 million taels worth of silver (equivalent to approximately $2.4 billion today), which brought him the moniker "the Rockefeller of China". He died in Batavia from pneumonia.

== Early life ==
He was born in 1840 in Dabu, Guangdong, China to a poor Hakka family. Cheong started working at an early age as a cowherd back in his village. At age 16, Cheong had left Guangdong while the Cantonese Red Turban rebellion and political purges ravaged much of Guangdong, and in that same year another war had broken out between the Hakkas and the Cantonese locals. The people had experienced starvation hardship and suffering as they fled during the war. As a result, Cheong Fatt Tze migrated to South-East Asia together with other coastal Chinese families to seek their fortune.

== Career ==
He started as a water-carrier and then became a shopkeeper in Batavia, Dutch East Indies (today Jakarta, Indonesia). After his marriage, he established a trading company with the help of his father-in-law. Gradually, he began to accumulate his wealth through hard work and perseverance. In 1877, he expanded his business from Jakarta to Medan. His business was based on agricultural products such as rubber, coffee and tea but he branched out to the financial sector by acquiring a bank. This move made him a wealthy man.

In 1886, he expanded again to Penang, Malaysia. As his business grew, he owned three ships which plied between Penang and Medan. In the course of his work, he occasionally resided in Penang and owned a mansion in Leith Street, which stands to this day as protected heritage building.

== Political career ==
In 1890, in recognition of his hard work and contribution, he was appointed the Chinese Consul, based in Penang. This office was shifted to Singapore when that city became established as a well-known trading port in South-East Asia. As the Chinese Consul, he worked tirelessly for the interests of overseas Chinese residents through diplomatic channels with the British Raj authorities.

In 1899, he was summoned to China twice to present a national development plan, which was well received by government officials. As a result, he was promoted to be the Minister for agriculture, industries, roads and mines for the provinces of Fujian and Guangdong. Later he was instructed to conduct a study of trade and education in Penang and Singapore. Subsequently, the Singapore Chinese Chamber of Commerce was established. In 1904, he established the first Chinese school in Southeast Asia, the Chung Hwa Confucian School in Penang.

In 1912, the Kuomintang overthrew the Qing and established a republican government. Cheong was appointed as a member of the Legislative Assembly so that he could be actively involved with politics. He was also appointed as the Chairman of the Chinese national Chamber of Commerce, which was well received by all parties.

In 1915, he was sent to the United States to study all aspects of industrialization of that nation. During his journey, when he stopped over in Hong Kong, he was awarded a Ph.D. in Law.

== Death ==
Cheong Fatt Tze died in Indonesia in 1916. His body was sent back to China to be buried. On its final journey through Penang, Singapore and Hong Kong, the overseas Chinese were greatly saddened by the loss of this great personality. The Chinese government sent a high-ranking official to his funeral and ordered the National Archives to record his life in historical documents so that his contributions would always be remembered. Both the British Raj and the Dutch authorities ordered flags to be flown at half mast to honour the man who was known as "the Rockefeller of the East". He had eight wives and owned many residences throughout his trading empire (mostly Southeast Asia) but made Penang his base, where he raised his six sons.

== Legacy ==
In 1894, Chung Keng Quee hosted in his own gardens, in the name of Vice Consul Chang Pi Shih (Cheong Fatt Tze), a dinner to welcome Admiral Ting (see Battle of Yalu River (1894) and Battle of Weihaiwei) and the Chinese Imperial Fleet of warships that he commanded.

Cheong Fatt Tze first introduced grape vineyards in China's Shandong province, and later brought in Austrian wine-producing experts to improve the ChangYu vineyard in Yantai, Shandong. Cheong Fatt Tze also gave shelter to Sun Yat Sen and Sun Yat Sen 's fourth wife in Penang, Cheong Fatt Tze also helped Sun Yat Sen with Money to promote a Chinese Nationalist movement in China after 1911.

A street in George Town, Penang, which was formerly named Hong Kong Street, was renamed after him, Jalan Cheong Fatt Tze. His blue mansion, Cheong Fatt Tze Mansion, is a heritage building, located at Leith Street in George Town. It is open for guided tours, and also offers accommodation and has an on-site restaurant. He left another mansion in his birthplace, Dabu, Guangdong Province, China.
