= List of Hakka people =

A list of notable Hakka people, belonging to the Han Chinese.

== Revolutionary, political and military leaders ==
=== China – Taiping Heavenly Kingdom ===
Name (Hakka pronunciation)	Chinese name	Birth-Death	Born	Ancestry	Description
Hong Xiuquan (Fung Siew Chen)	洪秀全	1812–1864	Huaxian, Guangdong	Meixian, Guangdong	Heavenly King (天王), 1851; Leader, Taiping Rebellion; The Taiping Heavenly Kingdom (太平天国), 1851–1864, established by Hong had, at one stage, occupied one-third of China, and almost toppled the Qing dynasty
Feng Yunshan (Fung Yun San)	馮雲山 冯云山	1815–1852	Huaxian, Guangdong	Longchuan, Guangdong	South King (南王), 1851; Strategist of the Taiping Rebellion; Administrator of the Taiping Heavenly Kingdom during its early years
Yang Xiuqing (Yong Siew Tshin)	楊秀清 杨秀清	1821–1856	Guiping, Guangxi	Meixian, Guangdong	East King (东王), 1851; Commander-in-chief, Taiping Army
Shi Dakai (Sak Dat Ho)	石達開 石达开	1831–1863	Guixian, Guangxi	Heping, Guangdong	Wing King (翼王), 1851; The youngest of the six top leaders of Taiping at the age of 19; Shi's heroics as an outstanding general were later to inspire his fellow Hakka clansman, Zhu De, who founded the Red Army (红军), later known as the People's Liberation Army (人民解放军) His mother was of Zhuang origin.
Li Xiucheng (Lee Siew Sin)	李秀成	1823–1864	Tengxian, Guangxi	Fengle, Guangdong	Loyal King (忠王), 1858; one of the key leaders at the later stages of the Kingdom
Bong Yucheng (Bong Nyuk Sin)	陳玉成 陈玉成	1837–1862	Tengxian, Guangxi	Wengyuan, Guangdong	Heroic King (英王), 1859; one of the key leaders at the later stages of the Kingdom
Hong Rengan (Fung Yin Kon)	洪仁玕	1822–1864	Huaxian, Guangdong	Meixian, Guangdong	Shield King (干王), 1859; Premier of the Kingdom; first person in China to advocate modern-style government and opening-up reforms

=== China – Qing dynasty ===
Name (Hakka pronunciation)	Chinese name	Birth-Death	Born	Ancestry	Description
Lai Enjue (Lai En Cheok)	赖恩爵	1795–1848	Shenzhen	Zijin, Guangdong	Admiral (水师提督), Guangdong Navy, 1843–1848; Commander, Battle of Kowloon, First Opium War, 1839; Just before Lai died due to illness, he told his family clan that his wish was to see the return of Hong Kong to China; Ten days before the handover of Hong Kong on 1 July 1997, more than a hundred of the Lai clan descendants from different parts of the world returned to their ancestral home to mark the event
Yan Botao	颜伯焘	1792–1855	Lianping, Guangdong	Lianping, Guangdong	Viceroy (总督), Fujian and Zhejiang Provinces, 1841–1842; Commander, Battle of Amoy, First Opium War, 1841
Feng Zicai (Fung Tse Choi)	馮子才 冯子才	1818–1903	Qinzhou, Guangxi	Bobai, Guangxi	Commander-in-chief, Provincial Army (提督), 1862-; Commanding general, Sino-French War, 1884–1885; Feng was instrumental in the defeat of the French at the Battle of Bang Bo which led to the French Retreat from Lạng Sơn and the conclusion of the war
Liu Yongfu (Liew Yun Fook)	劉永福 刘永福	1837–1917	Qinzhou, Guangxi	Bobai, Guangxi	Founder and commander of the celebrated Black Flag Army (黑旗军), 1857–1885; president, Republic of Formosa, 1895
Qiu Fengjia (Hiew Fung Kap)	丘逢甲	1864–1912	Miaoli, Taiwan	Jiaoling, Guangdong	Commander, Taiwanese militia forces, Japanese invasion of Taiwan, 1895; Revolutionary leader, Xinhai Revolution; Guangdong Representative for the Republic of China Provisional Presidential Election, 1911; Feng Chia University in Taiwan is named in honour of Qiu
Liu Guangdi (Liew Kong Tee)	劉光第 刘光第	1859–1898	Fushun, Sichuan	Wuping, Fujian	One of the "Six Gentlemen of the Hundred Days' Reform (戊戌六君子) – a group of six intellectuals executed by Empress Dowager Cixi for their attempts to help Guangxu Emperor implement the "Hundred Days' Reform" (戊戌变法)
Wen Shengcai (Voon Sang Choi)	溫生才	1869–1911	Meixian, Guangdong	Meixian, Guangdong	One of the Four Martyrs of Honghuagang (红花岗四烈士); Wen assassinated the Manchu general, Fu Qi, in 1911; All of the four martyrs of Honghuagang are Hakkas

=== China – Republic of China ===
Name (Hakka pronunciation)	Chinese name	Birth-Death	Born	Ancestry	Description
Sun Yat-sen (Soon Tsung San)	孫中山 孙中山	1866–1925	Xiangshan, Guangdong	Zijin, Guangdong	Founding father of modern China; first president, Provisional Government of the Republic of China, 1912
Yao Yuping	姚雨平	1882–1974	Pingyuan, Guangdong	Pingyuan, Guangdong	General, 1912-; Commander-in-chief, Guangdong Northern Expeditionary Army (广东北伐军), Xinhai Revolution, 1911–1912; Yao's successive victories against the Qing Army were vital in the successful defence of the Provisional Government in Nanjing and the early abdication of Xuan Tong Emperor
Liao Zhongkai (Liao Tshung Koi)	廖仲愷	1877–1925	San Francisco, USA	Huiyang, Guangdong	Sun Yat-sen's main advisor on financial matters; Liao was one of the three most powerful figures in Kuomintang when Sun died
Eugene Chen	陈友仁	1878–1944	San Fernando, Trinidad and Tobago	Meixian, Guangdong	Outstanding Foreign Minister in the 1920s known for his success in promoting Sun Yat-sen's anti-imperialist foreign policies; Chen's father is a former Taiping
Huang Shaohong	黃紹竑	1895–1966	Rong County, Guangxi	Rong County, Guangxi	General; Warlord of the New Guangxi clique which controlled Guangxi and much of Guangdong, Hunan, and Hubei, 1924–1929
Chen Jitang (Chin Tsi Thong)	陳濟棠 陈济棠	1890–1954	Fangcheng, Guangxi	Bobai, Guangxi	General First-class (four-star general), 1935-; Chen was a warlord known as the "Southern Heavenly King" (南天王) as he wielded absolute control of the government and army of autonomous Guangdong, 1929–1936
Chen Mingshu	陈铭枢	1889–1965	Bepu, Guangxi	Bepu, Guangxi	Acting premier of the Republic of China, 1931–1932; General, 1947-; Commander-in-Chief, 19th Route Army (十九路军), Battle of Shanghai, 1931–1932; The 19th Route Army, which started off as a Regiment unit under the command of Chen in the First Division of the Guangdong Army, was one of Nationalist China best fighting forces
Deng Yanda	鄧演達 邓演达	1895–1931	Huiyang, Guangdong	Huiyang, Guangdong	Leftist Nationalist politician who, in 1930, founded the Chinese Peasants' and Workers' Democratic Party, one of the eight non-communist, legally recognised political parties in the People's Republic of China today; Deng was a military commander in the elite First Division of the Guangdong Army
Sun Ke (Soon Kho)	孫科 孙科	1895–1973	Xiangshan, Guangdong	Zijin, Guangdong	Premier of the Republic of China, 1932, 1948–1949
Xue Yue (Siet Ngok)	薛岳	1896–1998	Lechang, Guangdong	Rucheng, Hunan	General First-class (four-star general), 1952-; Commander-in-chief, 9th War Zone, Second Sino-Japanese War, 1938–1945; called "Patton of Asia" by the west and the "God of War" (战神) by the Chinese, Xue was China most outstanding general during the war against the Japanese
Zhang Fakui (Tshong Fat Khui)	張發奎 张发奎	1896–1980	Shixing, Guangdong	Shixing, Guangdong	General, 1936-; Commander-in-chief, National Revolutionary Army ground forces, 1949; Commander-in-chief, 4th War Zone, Second Sino-Japanese War, 1939–1944; As Honorary President of the "Hong Kong Tsung Tsin Association" (香港崇正总会), the umbrella body for Hakkas in Hong Kong, Zhang initiated and organized the first World Hakka Congress in 1971
Huang Qixiang	黃琪翔	1898–1970	Meixian, Guangdong	Meixian, Guangdong	General, 1946-; Leftist Nationalist; Deputy Commander-in-chief, 5th War Zone (later 6th War Zone), Second Sino-Japanese War, 1938; Led the Chinese Peasants' and Workers' Democratic Party, 1931–1938, after Deng Yanda's death; one of the two most outstanding generals (the other being fellow Hakka Ye Ting) during the First Expedition of the Northern Expedition, 1926, and was promoted to Commander, Fourth Army, for the Second Expedition, 1927, at the age of 28
Luo Zhuoying	羅卓英 罗卓英	1896–1961	Dabu, Guangdong	Dabu, Guangdong	General, 1946-; Commander-in-chief, 1st Route Expeditionary Forces, Burma (China first participation of a war overseas), 1942; Deputy Commander-in-chief, 9th War Zone, Second Sino-Japanese War, 1941
Huang Baitao	黄百韬	1900–1948	Tianjin	Meixian, Guangdong	General, 1948; Commander-in-chief, 7th Army Group; Twice recipient of the Order of Blue Sky and White Sun (the highest honour for a military commander); Huang committed suicide rather than surrendering after he was defeated at the Huaihai Campaign, the most decisive battle of the Chinese Civil War, in 1948
Fan Hanjie	范漢傑 范汉杰	1896–1976	Dabu, Guangdong	Dabu, Guangdong	Lieutenant General, 1945-; Deputy Commander-in-chief, National Revolutionary Army ground forces, 1948; Deputy Commander-in-chief, Dongbei (Manchuria) Force, Chinese Civil War, 1948; Deputy Commander-in-chief, 1st War Zone, Second Sino-Japanese War, 1945; Fan was one of the favourite generals of Chiang Kaishek
Wu Qiwei	吳奇偉 吳奇伟	1890–1953	Dabu, Guangdong	Dabu, Guangdong	Lieutenant General, 1935-; Governor of Hunan, 1945–1946; Commander-in-chief, Changjiang (Yangtze River) Defence Force, Second Sino-Japanese War, 1942–1944; Deputy Commander-in-chief, 4th War Zone (later 6th War Zone), Second Sino-Japanese War, 1939; Wu defected to the Communists in 1949
Miao Peinan	缪培南	1890–1970	Wuhua, Guangdong	Wuhua, Guangdong	Lieutenant General, 1936-; Commander-in-chief, 9th Army Group, Second Sino-Japanese War, 1940; Miao represented the Chinese government to accept the Japanese surrender in Guangdong, 1945
Xie Jinyuan (Tsia Tshin Ngian)	謝晉元 谢晋元	1905–1941	Jiaoling, Guangdong	Jiaoling, Guangdong	Major General, 1941; Commander, Defence of Sihang Warehouse, Shanghai, 1937; The heroism of Xie and the defenders of the warehouse which lifted flagging Chinese morale was made into films in 1938 and 1976 named "Eight Hundred Heroes" (八百壯士)
Yao Ziqing	姚子青	1909–1937	Pingyuan, Guangdong	Pingyuan, Guangdong	General; Commander during the Defence of Baoshan, part of the Battle of Shanghai, 1937; The heroism of Yao and the defenders of the Baoshan where all 600 soldiers but one lost their lives to defend the county was made into film named "Defenders" (捍衛者)

=== China – People's Republic ===
Name (Hakka pronunciation)	Chinese name	Birth-Death	Born	Ancestry	Description
Li Lisan	李立三	1899–1967	Liling, Hunan	Liling, Hunan	Top leader of Chinese Communist Party, 1928–1930
Zhu De	朱德	1886–1976	Yilong, Sichuan	Shaoguan, Guangdong	Chairman of the National People's Congress (Head of State), People's Republic of China, 1975–1976; Marshal, 1955-; Founder and Commander-in-chief of the Red Army (红军), later known as the People's Liberation Army (人民解放军)
Ye Ting	葉挺 叶挺	1896–1946	Huiyang, Guangdong	Huiyang, Guangdong	Commander-In-chief, New Fourth Army, one of the two main Chinese communist forces fighting the Japanese Imperial Army during the Second Sino-Japanese War (the other main communist force, Eighth Route Army, was commanded by Zhu De)
Ye Jianying (Yap Kiam Yin)	葉劍英 叶剑英	1897–1986	Meixian, Guangdong	Meixian, Guangdong	Chairman of the National People's Congress (Head of State), People's Republic of China, 1978–1983; Marshal, 1955-; Communist China first Governor of Guangdong, 1949–1953; Ye led the overthrow of the Gang of Four, which marked the end of the Cultural Revolution
Hu Yaobang (Fu Yau Bong)	胡耀邦	1915–1989	Liuyang, Hunan	Ji'an, Jiangxi	Chairman of the Chinese Communist Party, 1981–1982; General Secretary of the Chinese Communist Party, 1980–1987; Both positions during these periods made Hu the highest-ranked in the Chinese Communist Party and the second most powerful person in China after Deng Xiaoping; In 1989, the memorial service for his death sparked off a pro-democracy movement which led to the Tiananmen Square protests
Liao Chengzhi (Liau Sin Chee)	廖承志	1908–1983	Tokyo, Japan	Huiyang, Guangdong	Liao died four days after he was nominated to be the vice-president, People's Republic of China; first Director, Hong Kong and Macau Affairs Office, 1978–1983
Liu Yalou	劉亞樓 刘亚楼	1910–1965	Wuping, Fujian	Wuping, Fujian	General, 1955-; first commander-in-chief, People's Liberation Army Air Force, 1949–1965
Wang Shoudao	王首道	1906–1996	Liuyang, Hunan	Liuyang, Hunan	Vice-Chairman, Chinese People's Political Consultative Conference (中国人民政治协商会议), 1978–1983; Governor of Hunan, 1950–1952
Yang Chengwu (Yong Sin Woo)	楊成武 杨成武	1904–2004	Changting, Fujian	Changting, Fujian	Vice-Chairman, Chinese People's Political Consultative Conference (中国人民政治协商会议), 1983–1988; General, 1955-; Acting Chief of General Staff, People's Liberation Army, 1965–1968
Xiao Hua	肖华	1916–1985	Xingguo, Jiangxi	Xingguo, Jiangxi	Youngest General at the age of 39, 1955; Vice-Chairman, Chinese People's Political Consultative Conference (中国人民政治协商会议), 1983–1985; Chief Political Commissar, People's Liberation Army, 1964–1967
Yang Yong	杨勇	1913–1983	Liuyang, Hunan	Liuyang, Hunan	Member, Secretariat of the Chinese Communist Party (中国共产党中央书记处), 1982–1983; General, 1955-; Deputy Chief of General Staff, People's Liberation Army, 1959; Governor of Guizhou, 1950–1951
Lai Chuanzhu	赖传珠	1910–1965	Ganxian, Jiangxi	Ganxian, Jiangxi	General, 1955-; Political Commissar, 15th Army Corps (later 13th Army Corps), Fourth Field Army, 1948–1950; Chief of Staff, New Fourth Army, 1941–1945; The life story of Lai was made into a television drama, "General Diary Complete" (将军日记), in 2011
Chen Qihan	陈奇涵	1910–1965	Ganxian, Jiangxi	Ganxian, Jiangxi	General, 1955-; first president, Military Court, People's Liberation Army, 1954–1957; Commander-in-chief, Jiangxi Military Region, 1949
Li Tianyou	李天佑	1914–1970	Lingui, Guangxi	Lingui, Guangxi	General, 1955-; Deputy Chief of Staff, People's Liberation Army, 1962–1970; A film, titled "Li Tianyou Jagged Siping" (李天佑血战四平), about how Li led the Communist first-ever attack and victory of a city, Battle of Siping, 1946, was made in 2009
Ding Sheng	丁盛	1913–1999	Yudu, Jiangxi	Yudu, Jiangxi	Major General, 1955-; Governor of Guangdong, 1972–1974
Zhang Tingfa	张廷发	1918–2010	Shaxian, Fujian	Shaxian, Fujian	Major General, 1955-; Commander-in-chief, People's Liberation Army Air Force, 1977–1985
Chen Pixian	陳丕顯 陈丕显	1916–1995	Shanghang, Fujian	Shanghang, Fujian	Member, Secretariat of the Chinese Communist Party (中国共产党中央书记处), 1982–1985; Governor of Hubei, 1978–1980
Ye Xuanping (Yap Sen Phin)	葉選平 叶选平	1924-	Meixian, Guangdong	Meixian, Guangdong	Vice-Chairman, Chinese People's Political Consultative Conference (中国人民政治协商会议), 1991–2003; Governor of Guangdong, 1985–1991
Xie Fei (Chia Fui)	謝非 谢非	1932–1999	Lufeng, Guangdong	Lufeng, Guangdong	Vice-Chairman, National People's Congress (全国人民代表大会), 1998–1999
Zhang Zhen	张震	1914–2015	Pingjiang, Hunan	Pingyuan, Guangdong	General, 1988-; Vice Chairman of the Central Military Commission, 1992–1997
Liao Hui	廖暉 廖晖	1942-	Hong Kong	Huiyang, Guangdong	Vice-Chairman, Chinese People's Political Consultative Conference (中国人民政治协商会议), 2003-; director, Hong Kong and Macau Affairs Office, 1997–2010
Huang Huahua (Wong Fah Fah)	黃華華 黄华华	1946-	Xingning, Guangdong	Xingning, Guangdong	Governor of Guangdong, 2003–2011; The stepping down of Huang as governor in 2011 marked the end of the dominance of the provincial government by the "Hakka clique" (客家帮)
Wu Changde	吴昌德	1952-	Dayu, Jiangxi	Dayu, Jiangxi	General, 2013-; Deputy Director, People's Liberation Army General Political Department, 2011-

=== Taiwan ===
Name (Hakka pronunciation)	Chinese name	Birth-Death	Born	Ancestry	Description
Lee Teng-hui	李登辉	1923-2020	New Taipei, Taiwan	Yongding, Fujian	President of the Republic of China, 1988–2000; first popularly elected president in Chinese history
Tsai Ing-wen (Chai Yin Vun)	蔡英文	1956-	Pingtung, Taiwan		President of the Republic of China, 2016–; first and only female president in Chinese history; first female without any political lineage to head a government in Asia
Li Yuan-tsu	李元簇	1923-	Pingjiang, Hunan	Pingjiang, Hunan	Vice-President of the Republic of China, 1990–1996
Annette Lu	呂秀蓮 吕秀莲	1944-	Taoyuan, Taiwan	Nanjing, Fujian	First and only female vice-president of the Republic of China, 2000–2008
Hsu Fu-lin	徐傅霖	1878–1958	Heping, Guangdong	Heping, Guangdong	Losing candidate in the Republic of China Presidential Election to Chiang Kai-shek, 1954; Leader, China Democratic Socialist Party, 1946–1958; Hsu was the finance minister in the Republic of China government in China, 1946-
Wang Sheng	王昇 王升	1915–2006	Longan, Jiangxi	Longan, Jiangxi	General, 1970-; director, General Political Warfare Department (总政治作战部), which was responsible for secret military and intelligence operations, 1975–1983; Wang was the second most powerful person in Taiwan after President Chiang Ching-kuo as he led the "Liu Shaokang Office" (刘少康办公室) which was described as the inner court of the Kuomintang party headquarters, 1979–1983 and he was rumoured to be the successor to Chiang
Yu Shyi-kun	游錫堃 游锡堃	1948-	Yilan, Taiwan	Zhao'an, Fujian	Premier of the Republic of China, 2002–2005; chairman, Democratic Progressive Party, 2006–2007
Jiang Yi-huah	江宜樺 江宜桦	1960-	Keelung, Taiwan		Premier of the Republic of China, 2013–2014
Hsu Hsin-liang (Hee Sin Leong)	許信良 许信良	1941-	Taoyuan, Taiwan	Raoping, Guangdong	Co-founder and chairman, Democratic Progressive Party, 1991–1994, 1996–1998; Presidential candidate, 2000 Republic of China presidential election
Hsu Hsin-ying	徐欣瑩	1972-	Hsinchu, Taiwan		Founder and chairman, Minkuotang, 2015-; Vice-Presidential candidate, 2016 Republic of China presidential election; Member of the Legislative Yuan, 2012–2015; Won by the highest majority among more than 100 legislative yuan seats in the 2012 Republic of China legislative election
Hsu Ching-chung	徐慶鐘 徐庆钟	1907–1996	Taipei, Taiwan	Jiaoling, Guangdong	Vice-Premier, Republic of China, 1972–1981
Chiu Chuang-huan	邱創煥 邱创焕	1925-	Changhua, Taiwan	Raoping, Guangdong	Vice-Premier, Republic of China, 1981–1984; Governor of Taiwan Province, 1984–1990
Liu Kwo-tsai	刘阔才	1911–1993	Miaoli, Taiwan	Pingyuan, Guangdong	President of the Legislative Yuan, 1988–1990
Yeh Chu-lan (Yap Kiuk Lan)	葉菊蘭 叶菊兰	1949-	Miaoli, Taiwan		Vice-Premier, Republic of China, 2004–2005
Chiang Pin-kung	江丙坤	1932-	Nantou, Taiwan	Pinghe, Fujian	Acting chairman, Kuomintang, 2007; chairman, Straits Exchange Foundation (海峽交流基金会), 2008–2012
Wu Po-hsiung (Ng Pak Hiung)	吳伯雄 吴伯雄	1939-	Taoyuan, Taiwan	Yongding, Fujian	Chairman, Kuomintang, 2007–2009; Mayor, Taipei, 1988–1990
Chen Ta-ching	陳大慶 陈大庆	1904–1973	Chongyi, Jiangxi	Chongyi, Jiangxi	Minister of National Defense, 1972–1973; Governor of Taiwan Province, 1969–1972; General First-class (four-star general), 1973-; Commander-In-chief, Republic of China Army, 1967–1969
Tang Yao-ming	湯曜明 汤曜明	1940-	Taichung, Taiwan	Yunxiao, Fujian	First Local (non-Mainlander) Taiwanese Minister of National Defense, 2002–2004; General First-class (four-star general), 1999-; Chief of General Staff, Republic of China Armed Forces, 1999–2002

=== Hong Kong ===
Name (Hakka pronunciation)	Chinese name	Birth-Death	Born	Ancestry	Description
Zeng Sheng	曾生	1910–1995	Huiyang, Guangdong	Huiyang, Guangdong	Legendary Commander, Dong River Column guerrilla force (东江纵队), which was made up mainly of Hakkas; Noteworthy accomplishments of the guerrilla force included the aiding of British and Commonwealth prisoners of war to escape successfully from Japanese internment camps and the rescuing of twenty American pilots who parachuted into Hong Kong when they were shot down during the Japanese occupation of Hong Kong, 1941–1945
David Lan	藍鴻震	1940-	Hong Kong	Dabu, Guangdong	Secretary for Home Affairs, 1997–2000
Martin Lee	李柱銘 李柱铭	1938-	Hong Kong	Huiyang, Guangdong	Founding chairman, Democratic Party, 1994–2002; Leading figure of Pan-democracy camp; Lee is hailed as the Father of democracy of Hong Kong
Lau Wong-fat	劉皇發 刘皇发	1936-	Hong Kong	Huiyang, Guangdong	Chairman, Heung Yee Kuk (乡议局), a powerful body representing 700 indigenous villages in New Territories, 1980–2015; Known as the "Land Emperor of the New Territories" (新界土皇帝), Lau is the political kingpin in the New Territories
Lee Wing Tat	李永達 李永达	1955-	Hong Kong	Huiyang, Guangdong	Chairman, Democratic Party, 2004–2006
Tam Yiu Chung (Tham Yau Tsung)	譚耀宗 谭耀宗	1949-	Hong Kong	Huiyang, Guangdong	Chairman, Democratic Alliance for Betterment of Hong Kong, the largest pro-Beijing political party in Hong Kong, 2007-

=== Singapore ===
Name (Hakka pronunciation)	Chinese name	Birth-Death	Born	Ancestry	Description
Elizabeth Choy	蔡楊素梅 蔡杨素梅	1910–2006	Sabah, Malaysia	Guangdong	War heroine; first and only woman in the Legislative Council of Singapore, 1951–1955
Lee Kuan Yew (Lee Kong Yau)	李光耀	1923–2015	Singapore	Dabu, Guangdong	Founding father of modern Singapore; first Prime Minister of Singapore, 1959–1990, mother was a Peranakan
Lee Hsien Loong (Lee Sen Lung)	李顯龍 李显龙	1952-	Singapore	Dabu, Guangdong	Prime Minister of Singapore, 2004-2024; Youngest Brigadier General, Singapore Armed Forces, 1983–1984 He is a mix of Hakka, Perankan and mostly Hokkien Nyonya.
Yong Nyuk Lin	楊玉麟 杨玉麟	1918–2012	Negri Sembilan, Malaysia	Meixian, Guangdong	Cabinet Minister, 1959–1976
Hon Sui Sen (Hon Sui Sang)	韓瑞生 韩瑞生	1916–1983	Penang, Malaysia	Jiexi, Guangdong	Cabinet Minister, 1970–1983
Howe Yoon Chong (Hiew Yoon Chong)	侯永昌	1923–2007	Meixian, Guangdong	Meixian, Guangdong	Cabinet Minister, 1979–1984 (Minister of Defence, 1979–1982)
Richard Hu (Foo Su Thau)	胡賜道 胡赐道	1926-	Singapore	Yongding, Fujian	Cabinet Minister, 1985–2001

=== Malaysia ===
Name (Hakka pronunciation)	Chinese name	Birth-Death	Born	Ancestry	Description
Yap Ah Loy	葉亞來 叶亚来	1837-1885	Huizhou, Guangdong	Huizhou, Guangdong	Founder of modern Kuala Lumpur, the capital of Malaysia; Kapitan Cina of Kuala Lumpur, 1868–1885
Chung Keng Quee (Chang Kin Gui)	鄭景貴 郑景贵	1827-1901	Zengcheng, Guangzhou, Guangdong	Zengcheng, Guangzhou, Guangdong	Founder, Taiping, Perak; Kapitan Cina, Perak, 1875–1900; Leader, Hai San Secret Society, Larut War, 1861–1874
Chin Ah Yam	陳亞炎 陈亚炎	-1899	Dabu, Guangdong	Dabu, Guangdong	Kapitan Cina, Perak, 1875–1899; Leader, Ghee Hin Secret Society, Larut War, 1861–1874
Leong Fee	梁輝 梁辉	1857-1911	Meixian, Guangdong	Meixian, Guangdong	First Chinese Member, Federal Legislative Council, 1909
Philip Lee Tau Sang	李道生	1912-1959	Sabah, Malaysia	Guangdong	Highly respected and leading Chinese politician who was greatly favoured by the British colonial rulers in North Borneo (now Sabah) in the 1950s
Lau Pak Khuan (Liew Pak Khiun)	劉伯群 刘伯群	1894-1971	Zengcheng, Guangzhou, Guangdong	Zengcheng, Guangzhou, Guangdong	First Chinese to be conferred the "Datuk Seri" title; Led the unsuccessful bid for Chinese equal citizenship-rights and official language status during the drafting of the Malaysian Constitution
Omar Ong Yoke Lin	翁毓麟	1917-2010	Kuala Lumpur, Malaysia	Huizhou, Guangdong	Cabinet Minister, 1955–1973; first Chinese president, Malaysian Senate, 1973–1980
Wong Pow Nee	王保尼	1911-2002	Penang, Malaysia	Xingning, Meizhou, Guangdong	First Chief Minister of Penang, 1957–1969
Peter Lo Sui Yin	羅思仁 罗思仁	1923-2020	Sabah, Malaysia	Longchuan, Heyuan, Guangdong	Chief Minister of Sabah, 1965–67; Cabinet Minister, 1963–1965
Chong Kah Kiat	章家傑	1947-	Sabah, Malaysia	Guangdong/Fujian	Chief Minister of Sabah, 2001–2003; Sabah state Minister of Tourism, Science, Technology and Environment, 1999–2007; Minister's in the Prime Minister's Department cum Senator, 1995–1996
James Wong Kim Min	黄金明	1922-2011	Sarawak, Malaysia	Guangdong	Leader of the Opposition of Malaysia, 1974; first Deputy Chief Minister, Sarawak, 1963–1966; president, Sarawak National Party, 1981–2003; Hold the record for being the longest serving Member of the Sarawak State Assembly for forty-five years, 1956–2001
Liew Vui Keong	刘伟强 劉偉強	1960-2020	Sabah, Malaysia	Guangdong	President of the Liberal Democratic Party 2014–2019; Minister's in the Prime Minister's Department, 2018–2020
Stephen Yong Kuet Tze	楊國斯 杨国斯	1921-2001	Sarawak, Malaysia	Dabu, Guangdong	Cabinet Minister, 1982–1990; Co-founder, Sarawak United Peoples' Party, Sarawak's first political party, 1959 (President, 1983–1990); Yong is best remembered for giving the Chinese in Sarawak a political voice
Lee Kim Sai (Lee Kim Sze)	李金狮	1937-2019	Selangor, Malaysia	Guangdong	Cabinet Minister, 1986–1995
Edmund Chong Ket Wah	章家傑	1956–2010	Sabah, Malaysia	Guangdong	Member of Parliament, 2004–2010
Yong Teck Lee	楊德利 杨德利	1958-	Sabah, Malaysia	Longchuan, Heyuan, Guangdong	Chief Minister of Sabah, 1996–1998; Founder and president, Sabah Progressive Party, 1994-
Peter Chin Fah Kui	陳華貴 陈华贵	1945-	Sarawak, Malaysia	Bao'an, Shenzhen/Dongguan, Guangdong	Cabinet Minister, 2004–2013; president, Sarawak United Peoples' Party, 2011-
Chong Sin Woon	魏家祥	1973-	Negeri Sembilan, Malaysia	Guangdong	Secretary-General, Malaysian Chinese Association, 2019-
Chor Chee Heung (Chau Chee Hiung)	曹智雄	1955-	Kedah, Malaysia	Dabu, Guangdong	Cabinet Minister, 2010–2013
Liow Tiong Lai (Liau Tsung Loi)	廖中莱	1961-	Malacca, Malaysia	Dabu, Guangdong	Cabinet Minister, 2008-2018; president, Malaysian Chinese Association, 2013-2018
Vivian Wong Shir Yee	廖中莱	1989-	Sabah, Malaysia	Guangdong	Member of Parliament, 2019-
Wee Ka Siong (Ngui Ka Seong)	魏家祥	1968-	Malacca, Malaysia	Lufeng, Guangdong	Cabinet Minister, 2013-2022; president, Malaysian Chinese Association, 2018-
Teresa Kok (Kok Su Sim)	郭素沁	1964-	Kuala Lumpur, Malaysia	Huizhou, Guangdong	Member of Parliament, 1999-; Won by the highest majority among more than 200 constituency seats in the 2008 and 2013 Malaysian general elections; In the 2013 election, Kok won more than 85% of the total votes cast, a record in Malaysia history
Stephen Wong Tien Fatt	黄天发 黃天發	1954-2019	Sabah, Malaysia	Guangdong	Member of Parliament, 2013-2019
Mary Yap Kain Ching	叶娟呈	1951-	Sabah, Malaysia	Guangdong	Member of Parliament, 2013-2018
Linda Tsen	曾道玲	1956-	Sabah, Malaysia	Guangdong	Member of Parliament, 2010–2018
Christina Liew	曾道玲	1953-	Hong Kong	Guangdong	Member of Parliament, 2013–2022; Deputy Chief Minister, 2018–2020
Chong Hon Nyan (Chong Hon Nyan)	張漢源 张汉源	1924-2020	Kuala Lumpur, Malaysia	Guangdong	Minister of Health (1978–1982) and Transport (1983–1986)
Lo Su Fui	曾道玲	1981-	Sabah, Malaysia	Guangdong	Member of Parliament, 2022–
Liew Chin Tong	曾道玲	1977-	Johor, Malaysia	Guangdong	Member of Parliament, 2008–

=== Indonesia ===
Name (Hakka pronunciation)	Chinese name	Birth-Death	Born	Ancestry	Description
Luo Fangbo (Lo Fong Bak)	羅芳伯 罗芳伯	1738–1778	Meixian, Guangdong	Meixian, Guangdong	Founder and president, Hakka Republic of Lanfang in West Kalimantan, 1777–1884; The republic lasted for 107 years and had ten presidents who are all Meixian Hakkas
Basuki Tjahaja Purnama (Tjung Ban Hok)	鍾萬學 钟万学	1966-	Bangka–Belitung Islands, Indonesia	Meixian, Guangdong	First Chinese governor, Jakarta, capital of Indonesia, which is considered to be the third most powerful position in Indonesia, 2014-; Basuki is more popularly known by his Hakka name, "Ahok" (阿学)
Christiandy Sanjaya (Wong Hon San)	黄汉山	1964-	West Kalimantan, Indonesia	Jiexi, Guangdong	Deputy Governor, West Kalimantan, 2008–2013; first elected Chinese deputy governor of Indonesia
Teddy Jusuf (Hiung Tet Yie)	熊德怡	1966-	West Java, Indonesia	Meixian, Guangdong	First and only Chinese to attain the rank of Brigadier General, Indonesian National Armed Forces, 1983
Willybrodus Lay (Lay Wie Fa)		1961-	Atambua, East Nusa Tenggara, Indonesia	Meixian, Guangdong	First Chinese regent of Belu, East Nusa Tenggara from 2016-2021

=== Thailand ===
Name (Hakka pronunciation)	Chinese name	Birth-Death	Born	Ancestry	Description
Thaksin Shinawatra (Hiew Tat Sin)	丘達新 丘达新	1949-	Chiang Mai, Thailand	Fengshun, Guangdong	Only prime minister of Thailand to be re-elected in Thailand history, 2001–2006; Parties linked to Thaksin had won all the five general elections in Thailand since 2001
Yingluck Shinawatra (Hiew Yin Lok)	丘仁樂 丘仁乐	1967-	Chiang Mai, Thailand	Fengshun, Guangdong	First and only female prime minister of Thailand, 2011–2014
Supachai Panitchpakdi		1946-	Bangkok, Thailand		Deputy Prime Minister, 1992–1995, 1997–2001; first and only Asian director-general, World Trade Organization, 2002–2005
Sudarat Keyuraphan		1961-	Bangkok, Thailand		Cabinet Minister, 2002–2006
Chaiyasit Shinawatra		1945-	Chiang Mai, Thailand	Fengshun, Guangdong	Supreme Commander, Royal Thai Armed Forces, 2004–2005; Commander-in-Chief, Royal Thai Army, 2003–2004
Paetongtarn Shinawatra		1986-	Bangkok, Thailand	Fengshun, Guangdong	Prime Minister of Thailand, 2024-present

=== Cambodia ===
Name (Hakka pronunciation)	Chinese name	Birth-Death	Born	Ancestry	Description
Sok An (Soo On)	索安	1950-	Takéo, Cambodia		Deputy Prime Minister, Cambodia, 2004-2017

=== Myanmar ===
Name (Hakka pronunciation)	Chinese name	Birth-Death	Born	Ancestry	Description
Ne Win	奈温	1910–2002	Bago Region, Myanmar	Meixian, Guangdong	President of Myanmar, 1974–1981; chairman, Union Revolutionary Council, 1962–1974; Prime Minister of Myanmar, 1958–1960, 1962–1974; Commander-in-chief (formerly known as chief of staff), Myanmar Armed Forces, 1949–1972; Ne Win was the paramount leader of Myanmar for three decades
San Yu	山友	1918–1996	Bago Region, Myanmar		President of Myanmar, 1981–1988; Commander-in-chief, Myanmar Armed Forces, 1972–1974
Khin Nyunt	钦纽	1939-	Yangon Region, Myanmar	Meixian, Guangdong	Prime Minister of Myanmar, 2003–2004; General, Myanmar Armed Forces, 2002–2003

=== Timor-Leste ===
Name (Hakka pronunciation)	Chinese name	Birth-Death	Born	Ancestry	Description
Pedro Lay (Lai Sze Fong)	黎事芳		Timor-Leste	Meixian, Guangdong	First Chinese Cabinet Minister, 2007–2015
Francisco Kalbuadi Lay (Lai Fatt Fong)	黎发芳	1954-	Timor-Leste	Meixian, Guangdong	Cabinet Minister, 2012-; first Chinese to be elected to National Parliament, 2002–2005

=== Australia ===
Name (Hakka pronunciation)	Chinese name	Birth-Death	Born	Ancestry	Description
Penny Wong	黃英賢 黃英贤	1968-	Sabah, Malaysia	Bao'an, Shenzhen, Guangdong	First Chinese and first Asian Cabinet Minister, 2007–2013; first female Leader of the Government in the Senate, 2013; first female leader of the opposition in the Senate, 2013-
Helen Sham-Ho	何沈慧霞	1943-	Hong Kong	Bao'an, Guangdong	Member, New South Wales Legislative Council, 1988–2003; first Chinese to be elected to an Australian parliament
Peter Wong	黄肇强	1942-	Zhaoqing, Guangdong	Zijin, Heyuan, Guangdong	Member, New South Wales Legislative Council, 1999–2007; Leading anti-white nationalist politician; Founder, Unity Party, which was formed to oppose Pauline Hanson and her white supremacy One Nation party, 1997
Alfred Huang	黃國鑫 黄国鑫	1938-	Chengdu, Sichuan	Jiaoling, Guangdong	Lord Mayor, Adelaide, 2000–2003
Robert Chong (Tsung Foo Hee)	鐘富喜 钟富喜	1954-	Malaysia	Meixian, Guangdong	Mayor, Whitehorse, Victoria, 2002–2005
Henry Tsang	曾筱龍 曾筱龙	1943-	Nanchang, Jiangxi	Wuhua, Guangdong	Deputy Lord Mayor, Sydney, 1991–1999; Member, New South Wales Legislative Council, 1999–2009

=== French Polynesia ===
Name (Hakka pronunciation)	Chinese name	Birth-Death	Born	Ancestry	Description
Gaston Tong Sang		1949-	Bora-bora, French Polynesia	Guangdong	President, French Polynesia, 2006–2007, 2008–2011; Tong Sang is of mixed blood with Hakka Chinese ancestry on his paternal side

=== Mauritius ===
Name (Hakka pronunciation)	Chinese name	Birth-Death	Born	Ancestry	Description
Moilin Jean Ah-Chuen (Chu Moi Lin)	朱梅麟	1909–1991	Mauritius	Meixian, Guangdong	First Chinese Cabinet Minister, 1967–1976; first Chinese member, Legislative Council, 1949; Second Hakka after Sun Yat-sen to have his portrait printed on the bills of a country's currency
Joseph Tsang Mang Kin	曾繁興 曾繁兴	1938-	Mauritius	Meixian, Guangdong	Cabinet Minister, 1995–2000; As a poet, Tsang has written a number of poems on the Hakka culture

=== Seychelles ===
Name (Hakka pronunciation)	Chinese name	Birth-Death	Born	Ancestry	Description
Li Huarong (Lee Fah Yin)	李华荣		Seychelles	Meixian, Guangdong	Deputy Minister
Qu Xing Zhu		2002-	Suriname	Guangdon	First Hakka student in computer science in Utrecht University

=== United Kingdom ===
Name (Hakka pronunciation)	Chinese name	Birth-Death	Born	Ancestry	Description
Nat Wei, Baron Wei	韋鳴恩 韦鸣恩	1977-	Hertfordshire, England	Zhongshan, Guangdong	Youngest member at the age of 34 and first British-born person of Chinese origin in the House of Lords, 2011-

=== France ===
Name (Hakka pronunciation)	Chinese name	Birth-Death	Born	Ancestry	Description
André Thien Ah Koon	曾憲建 曾宪建	1940-	Reunion Island, France	Meixian, Guangdong	First and only Chinese elected to the French National Assembly and the first Chinese elected to a parliament in Europe, 1986–2006; Mayor, Tampon, Reunion Island, 1983–2006, 2014–2020; first Chinese mayor of Reunion Island and France

=== Netherlands ===
Name (Hakka pronunciation)	Chinese name	Birth-Death	Born	Ancestry	Description
Varina Tjon-A-Ten	张	1952-	Paramaribo, Suriname	Guangdong	First Chinese elected to the House of Representatives, 2003–2006; Tjon-A-Ten is of mixed blood with paternal Hakka Chinese grandfather who migrated from Guangdong to Suriname
Roy Ho Ten Soeng	何天送	1945-	Paramaribo, Suriname	Guangdong	Mayor, Venhuizen, North Holland, 2000–2006; first immigrant mayor of Netherlands; first Chinese mayor of Netherlands and Europe

=== United States ===
Name (Hakka pronunciation)	Chinese name	Birth-Death	Born	Ancestry	Description
David Chiu	邱信福	1970-	Ohio, USA		Member, California State Assembly, 2014-
Yiaway Yeh	葉亞威 叶亚威	1978-	San Francisco, USA	Meixian, Guangdong	First Chinese mayor of Palo Alto, California, 2012

=== Guyana ===
Name (Hakka pronunciation)	Chinese name	Birth-Death	Born	Ancestry	Description
Arthur Chung	鐘亞瑟 钟亚瑟	1916–2008	West Demerara, Guyana	Dabu, Guangdong	First President, Guyana, 1970–1980

=== Trinidad and Tobago ===
Name (Hakka pronunciation)	Chinese name	Birth-Death	Born	Ancestry	Description
Solomon Hochoy	何才	1905–1983	Jamaica	Bao'an, Guangdong	Last British governor, 1960–1962; first non-white governor in the whole of the British Empire, 1960; first governor-general, 1962–1972, when Trinidad and Tobago obtained independence in 1962; first Chinese head of state in a non-Asian country

=== Suriname ===
Name (Hakka pronunciation)	Chinese name	Birth-Death	Born	Ancestry	Description
Henk Chin A Sen	陳亞先 陈亚先	1934–1999	Marowijne District, Suriname	Huiyang, Guangdong	President and Prime Minister of Suriname, 1980–1982; Chin paternal side is Hakka Chinese and maternal side is mixed Creole

=== Jamaica ===
Name (Hakka pronunciation)	Chinese name	Birth-Death	Born	Ancestry	Description
Rose Leon		1913–1999	Kingston, Jamaica		First Chinese and first female Cabinet Minister, 1953–1960, 1972–1976; first Chinese Member, House of Representatives, 1949; first female chairperson of a political party – Jamaica Labour Party, 1948
Horace Chang	霍勒斯.郑	1952-	Westmorland, United Kingdom		Cabinet Minister, 2007–2011
Delroy Chuck	德尔罗伊.卓	1950-	Manchester Parish, Jamaica	Dongguan	Cabinet Minister, 2011–2012; first Chinese Speaker, House of Representatives, 2007–2011

=== Brazil ===
Name (Hakka Pronunciation)	Chinese name	Birth-Death	Born	Ancestry	Description
William Boss Wu	巫佰禧	1968-	São Paulo, Brazil	Raoping, Guangdong	First and only Chinese elected to the National Congress of Brazil, 2006-

== Government officials, academics, literary figures and others ==
=== China ===
Name (Hakka name)	Chinese writing	Birth-Death	Born - Ancestry	Description	
Huang Zunxian	黃遵憲 黄遵宪	1848–1905	Meixian, Guangdong Meixian, Guangdong	Famous diplomat and poet; Consul-General (总领事) to San Francisco, United States, 1882–1886 and Singapore, 1891–1894	
Chen Yinke	陳寅恪 陈寅恪	1890–1969	Changsha, Hunan Xiushui, Jiangxi	Sinologist; Considered as one of the most influential historians in 20th century China	
Guo Moruo	郭沫若	1892–1978	Leshan, Sichuan Ninghua, Fujian	Author, poet and historian; Considered to be one of the most important literary figures of modern China; first president, Chinese Academy of Sciences, 1949–1978	
Zhang Ziping	張資平 张资平	1893–1959	Meixian, Guangdong Meixian, Guangdong	Popular novelist in the 1930s	
Zhang Dingcheng	張鼎丞 张鼎丞 1898–1981	Yongding, Fujian Yongding, Fujian	First Procurator-General, Supreme People's Procuratorate (最高人民检察院), 1954–1975; Governor of Fujian, 1949–1954		
Liang Boqiang	梁伯强	1899–1968	Meixian, Guangdong	Meixian, Guangdong	Pioneer pathologist; Liang has educated and served as a role model to hundreds of pathologists in China
Lin Fengmian	林風眠	1900–1991	Meixian, Guangdong	Meixian, Guangdong	One of the pioneers of modern Chinese painting
Wang Li	王力	1900–1986	Bobai, Guangxi	Tingzhou, Fujian	Considered to be the founder of modern Chinese linguistics
Li Guohao (Lee Ket Hau)	李國豪 李国豪	1913–2005	Meixian, Guangdong	Meixian, Guangdong	One of the top bridge engineering experts in the world; president, Tongji University, Shanghai, 1977–1984
Lu Jiaxi	卢嘉锡	1915–2001	Xiamen, Fujian	Yongding, Fujiang	President, Chinese Academy of Sciences, 1981–1987
Liu Fuzhi	劉復之 刘复之	1917–2013	Meixian, Guangdong	Meixian, Guangdong	Procurator-General, Supreme People's Procuratorate, 1988–1993
Zheng Xiaoying	郑小瑛	1929-	Yongding, Fujian	Yongding, Fujian	China's first female orchestra conductor
Xiao Yang (Siau Yong)	肖扬	1938-	Heyuang, Guangdong	Heyuan, Guangdong	President, Supreme People's Court (最高人民法院) (Chief Justice), 1998–2008
Zhu Dake	朱大可	1957-	Shanghai	Wuping, Fujian	Scholar and Chinese cultural critic; Zhu was listed as one of the "50 Top Chinese Influencing the World's Future" by the magazine, Phoenix Life, 2006
Zeng Jinyan	曾金燕	1983-	Longyan, Fujian	Longyan, Fujian	One of China's leading human rights activists; Wife of Hu Jia, a key figure in China's dissident movement; Zeng was selected as "TIME Magazine's 100 People Who Shape Our World" in 2007

=== Taiwan ===
Name (Hakka name)	Chinese writing	Birth-Death	Born	Ancestry	Description
Loa Ho	賴和	1894–1943	Changhua, Taiwan	Raoping, Guangdong	Poet and anti-Japanese Occupation political activist; Loa is hailed as the "Father of Modern Taiwanese Literature"
Wu Chuo-liu	吳濁流	1900–1976	Hsinchu, Taiwan	Jiaoling, Guangdong	Influential novelist; Wu's highly acclaimed semi-autobiography, "Orphan of Asia" (亚细亚的孤兒), which highlighted the ambiguity of being Taiwanese, has since become a key theme in the contentious subject of Taiwanese identity
Jiang Wen-Ye	江文也	1910–1983	New Taipei, Taiwan	Yongding, Fujian	Well-known composer active in Japan and later in China; Jiang was a theme in the 2003 Japanese film, Café Lumière, directed by Hou Hsiao-Hsien, which tells the story of a young Japanese woman doing research on the composer; His work is featured on the soundtrack, and his Japanese wife and daughter make appearances as themselves
Chung Li-ho (Tsung Lee Foh)	鐘理和 钟理和	1915–1960	Pingtung, Taiwan	Meixian, Guangdong	Famous novelist; Chung's autobiographical novel, "My Native Land" (原乡人), was made into a film of the same name in 1980
Lin Haiyin (Lim Hoi Yim)	林海音	1918–2001	Osaka, Japan	Jiaoling, Guangdong	Famous novelist; Lin's memoirs, "My Memories of Old Beijing" (城南旧事), was made into a film of the same name in 1982; The film was selected as one of the "100 Greatest Chinese Films of the 20th Century" by Yazhou Zhoukan (Asia Weekly)
Chung Chao-cheng	鍾肇政	1925-	Taoyuan, Taiwan	Wuhua, Guangdong	Novelist; Known as the Mother of Taiwanese Literature; Chung's novel, "The Dull Ice Flower" (鲁冰花), was made into films in 1989 and 2008
Rai Hau-min	賴浩敏	1939-	Miaoli, Taiwan		President, Judicial Yuan (Chief Justice), 2010-
Lü Shao-chia	呂紹嘉	1960-	Hsinchu, Taiwan		One of the world's leading opera conductors of his generation
Gan Yao-ming	甘耀明	1972-	Miaoli, Taiwan		Fiction writer who has received various literary awards; Gan's writings are often colored with Hakka language, culture and history

=== Hong Kong ===
Name (Hakka name)	Chinese writing	Birth-Death	Born	Ancestry	Description
Lau Soei	刘瑞	1866–1942	Huiyang, Guangdong	Huiyang, Guangdong	Third-generation grandmaster of Southern Praying Mantis (南派螳螂) martial art, which was originally taught only to Hakka people; Lau is acknowledged by both the practitioners of the Chow Gar (周家) and the Chu Gar (朱家) schools as the founding grandmaster in the modern era
Lam Yiu-Kwai (Lim Yau Gui)	林耀桂	1877–1966	Huiyang, Guangdong	Huiyang, Guangdong	Creator of Southern Dragon (龙形拳) martial art
Lo Hsiang-lin (Lo Heong Lim)	羅香林 罗香林	1906–1978	Xingning, Guangdong	Xingning, Guangdong	Considered to be the most eminent scholar on Hakka culture and language
Jao Tsung-I	饒宗頤 饶宗颐	1917–2018	Chaozhou, Guangdong	Meixian, Guangdong	Prominent scholar who has contributed to various fields of humanities with many pioneering works and a master of Chinese calligraphy and painting
Woon Swee Oan	溫瑞安 温瑞安	1954-	Perak, Malaysia	Meixian, Guangdong	One of the four major wuxia novelists; Some of Woon's novels, "The Four" (四大名捕), "Face to Fate" (布衣神相) and "Strike at Heart" (惊艳一枪) have been made into television dramas and films

=== Singapore ===
Name (Hakka name)	Chinese writing	Birth-Death	Born	Ancestry	Description
Lee Choo Neo	李珠娘	1895–1947	Singapore	Dabu, Guangdong	First female doctor in Singapore
Gregory Yong	杨瑞元	1925–2008	Perak, Malaysia		First local Roman Catholic Archbishop of Singapore, 1977–2000
Yong Pung How (Yong Bong Hau)	楊邦孝 杨邦孝	1926–2020	Kuala Lumpur, Malaysia	Dabu, Guangdong	Chief Justice, Singapore, 1990–2006

=== Malaysia ===
Name (Hakka name)	Chinese writing	Birth-Death	Born	Ancestry	Description
Koo Suk Chuan	古石泉		Meixian, Guangdong	Meixian, Guangdong	Founder, Ying Oi Tong (仁爱堂), Southeast Asia's oldest Chinese medical hall, in Penang, 1796
Hsieh Yung-kuan (Chia Yin Kong)	謝榮光 谢荣光	1848–1916	West Kalimantan, Indonesia	Meixian, Guangdong	Chinese Vice Consul in Penang, 1895–1903 and 1906–1907; also known as Cheah Choon Seng / Tjia Tjoen Sen
Jimmy Choo (Chiu Yong Ket)	周仰杰	1961-	Penang, Malaysia	Meixian, Guangdong	Renowned luxury fashion designer of shoes and handbags that carry "Jimmy Choo" name as its brand

=== Indonesia ===
Name (Hakka name)	Chinese writing	Birth-Death	Born	Ancestry	Description
Myra Sidharta (Euw Jong Tjhoen Moy)	歐陽春梅 欧阳春梅	1927-	Bangka-Belitung Islands, Indonesia	Meixian, Guangdong	Expert on Tionghoa Malay literature (Malay literature by Chinese Indonesians); Sidharta has an autobiography, "In Search of My Ancestral Home", where she narrated about her "pilgrimage" to Meixian, the place where her grandfather was from
Leo Suryadinata (Liauw Khian Joe)	廖建裕	1940-	Jakarta, Indonesia		Well-known sinologist on Chinese Indonesian

=== United Arab Emirates ===
Name (Hakka name)	Chinese writing	Birth-Death	Born	Ancestry	Description
Michael Hwang	黄锡义	1943-	Sydney, Australia	Meixian, Guangdong	Chief Justice, Dubai International Financial Centre Courts, 2010-

=== Mauritius ===
Name (Hakka name)	Chinese writing	Birth-Death	Born	Ancestry	Description
Bernard Yeung Sik Yuen	楊欽俊 杨钦俊	1950-	Mauritius	Meixian, Guangdong	Chief Justice, Mauritius, 2008-

=== United Kingdom ===
Name (Hakka name)	Chinese writing	Birth-Death	Born	Ancestry	Description
Han Suyin	韓素音 韩素音	1917–2012	Xinyang, Henan	Wuhua, Guangdong	Famous novelist and author of books on modern China; Han's father is Hakka Chinese and mother is Flemish

=== United States ===
Name (Hakka name)	Chinese writing	Birth-Death	Born	Ancestry	Description
Goo Kim Fui (Goo Kim Fui)	古今輝 古今辉	1835–1908	Meixian, Guangdong	Meixian, Guangdong	President, United Chinese Society (中华会馆) in Hawaii, 1892–1898; Chinese Consul General in Hawaii, 1902-; Played an instrumental role in uniting the Chinese and fighting for their rights during the anti-Chinese agitation in Hawaii in the 1880s-1890s
Steven N. S. Cheung	張五常 张五常	1935-	Hong Kong	Huiyang, Guangdong	Famous economist best known for his work on transaction costs and property rights
Ching W. Tang	鄧青雲 邓青云	1949-	Hong Kong	Guangdong	Physical chemist; Inventor of several groundbreaking electronic devices, including the organic light-emitting diode (OLED), which is found in most modern digital displays such as TVs, computer monitors and mobile phones; Received the Wolf Prize in Chemistry, 2011
Shing-Tung Yau (Hiew Sin Tung)	丘成桐	1949-	Shantou, Guangdong	Jiaoling, Guangdong	Famous mathematician; Received the Fields Medal (regarded as the Nobel Prize for mathematicians), 1982
Cho-Liang Lin	林昭亮	1960-	Hsinchu, Taiwan		World-renowned violinist and conductor who has performed with virtually every major orchestra in the world
Lianxing Wen	温联星	1968-	Shanghang, Fujian	Shanghang, Fujian	Seismologist, geodynamicist and planetary scientist who has made fundamental contributions to many discoveries in the Earth's interior; Recipient of the James B. Macelwane Medal, 2003
Stephen Shing-Toung Yau	丘成棟	1952	Hong Kong		Mathematician, Distinguished Professor Emeritus at the University of Illinois at Chicago, and currently teaches at Tsinghua University

=== Canada ===
Name (Hakka name)	Chinese writing	Birth-Death	Born	Ancestry	Description
Won Alexander Cumyow	溫金有	1861–1955	British Columbia, Canada	Guangdong	First person of Chinese origin born in Canada; As a court interpreter, Won is also the first Chinese public servant of Canada

== Entrepreneurs ==
=== China ===
Name (Hakka name)	Chinese writing	Birth-Death	Born	Ancestry	Description
Li Hejun	李河军	1967-	Heyuan, Guangdong	Heyuan, Guangdong	Founder, chairman and CEO, Hanergy; Li is ranked 7th richest in China, Forbes, 2014

=== Taiwan ===
Name (Hakka name)	Chinese writing	Birth-Death	Born	Ancestry	Description
Chao Teng-hsiung	赵藤雄	1944-	Miaoli, Taiwan		Founder and chairman, Farglory Group; Chao is ranked 15th richest in Taiwan, Forbes, 2015

=== Hong Kong ===
Name (Hakka name)	Chinese writing	Birth-Death	Born	Ancestry	Description
Lo Kwee-seong	羅桂祥 罗桂祥	1910–1995	Meixian, Guangdong	Meixian, Guangdong	Founder, Vitasoy International Holdings; Vitasoy is a well-known drinks and beverages brand in the world
Victor Lo Tang-seong	羅騰祥	1915–2016	Meixian, Guangdong	Meixian, Guangdong	Founder, Café de Coral
Tin Ka Ping	田家炳	1919–2018	Dabu, Guangdong	Dabu, Guangdong	Famous philanthropist who donated his entire fortune mainly for educational purposes
Raymond Chow	鄒文懷 邹文怀	1927-2018	Hong Kong	Dabu, Guangdong	Founder, Golden Harvest; Launched the careers of Bruce Lee and Jackie Chan
Sally Aw	胡仙	1931-	Yangon, Myanmar	Yongding, Fujian	Media mogul; former proprietor of The Standard, Sing Tao Daily and Tin Tin Daily
Tsang Hin-chi	曾宪梓	1934-	Meixian, Guangdong	Meixian, Guangdong	Founder and chairman, Goldlion Group
Charles Yeung	楊釗	1947-	Huiyang, Guangdong	Huiyang, Guangdong	Founder and chairman, Glorious Sun Enterprises
Pan Sutong	潘蘇通	1963-	Shaoguan, Guangdong	Shaoguan, Guangdong	Chairman, Goldin Group; Pan is ranked 6th richest in Hong Kong, Forbes 2016

=== Macau ===
Name (Hakka name)	Chinese writing	Birth-Death	Born	Ancestry	Description
Teddy Yip	葉德利 叶德利	1907–2003	North Sumatra, Indonesia	Meixian, Guangdong	Real estate magnate; Person behind the founding of the Macau Grand Prix; owner of the famed Formula One Theodore Racing team; one of the co-founders of Sociedade de Turismo e Diversões de Macau, which has a monopoly to run all casino operations and many other leisure activities in Macau

=== Singapore ===
Name (Hakka name)	Chinese writing	Birth-Death	Born	Ancestry	Description
Aw Boon Haw	胡文虎	1882–1954	Yangon, Myanmar	Yongding, Fujian	Philanthropist of Tiger Balm and Haw Par Villa fame; Media mogul of the Chinese world; founding president, Nanyang Khek Community Guild (南洋客属总会), the umbrella body for Hakkas in Singapore, 1929
Aw Boon Par	胡文豹	1888–1944	Yangon, Myanmar	Yongding, Fujian	Younger brother of Aw Boon Haw; philanthropist of Tiger Balm and Haw Par Villa fame
Jannie Chan	曾秀丽	1945-	Perak, Malaysia		Co-founder, The Hour Glass, with ex-husband; formerly known as Jannie Tay; Chan was named as one of the 50 Leading Women Entrepreneurs of the World in Paris, 1997

=== Malaysia ===
Name (Hakka name)	Chinese writing	Birth-Death	Born	Ancestry	Description
Cheong Fatt Tze	張弼士 张弼士	1840–1916	Dabu, Guangdong	Dabu, Guangdong	Powerful industrialist; Known as the "Rockefeller of the East"; Appointed Consul-General (Penang, later Singapore) in 1890 and Minister for Agriculture, Industries, Roads and Mines for the provinces of Fujian and Guangdong in 1899 by the Qing government; Cheong had served both the Qing and Republican governments
Yap Kwan Seng	葉觀盛/叶观盛	1846–1902	Chixi, Guangdong	Chixi, Guangdong	Last Kapitan Cina, Kuala Lumpur, 1889–1902
Foo Choo Choon	胡子春	1860–1921	Yongding, Fujian	Yongding, Fujian	Known as the "Tin King" (锡矿大王)
Chung Thye Phin	鄭大平 郑大平	1879–1935	Perak, Malaysia	Zengcheng, Guangdong	Last Kapitan Cina, Perak and British Malaya, 1930–1935; Wealthiest man in Penang at the time of his death
Leong Sin Nam	梁燊南	1880–1940	Meixian, Guangdong	Meixian, Guangdong	Wealthy tin mine owner; Philanthropist; Second non-British person to be conferred the Honorary Officer of the Most Excellent Order of the British Empire by the British
Lee Loy Seng	李莱生	1921–1994	Perak, Malaysia	Meixian, Guangdong	Founder, Kuala Lumpur Kepong: Lee's sons, Oi Hian and Hau Hian, are ranked 10th richest in Malaysia, Forbes, 2015
Jeffrey Cheah (Chia Foo Ngen)	謝富年 谢富年	1944-	Perak, Malaysia	Dongguan, Guangdong	Founder and chairman, Sunway Group; Cheah is ranked 19th richest in Malaysia, Forbes, 2015
Chan Fong Ann	陈冯安				Major shareholder, IOI Group; Chan was ranked 18th richest in Malaysia, Forbes, 2009

=== Indonesia ===
Name (Hakka name)	Chinese writing	Birth-Death	Born	Ancestry	Description
Tjong A Fie	張耀軒 张耀轩	1860–1921	Meixian, Guangdong	Meixian, Guangdong	Philanthropist; Kapitan Cina, Medan, 1911–1921; Led the building of the Chao-Shan Railway
Murdaya Poo	傅志宽	1941-	East Java, Indonesia	Meixian, Guangdong	Founder and chairman, Central Cipta Murdaya (Berca Group); Poo is ranked 13th richest in Indonesia, Forbes, 2015
Siti Hartati Murdaya (Tjouw Lie Ing)	邹丽英	1946-	Jakarta, Indonesia	Meixian, Guangdong	Wife of Murdaya Poo; Co-founder, Central Cipta Murdaya (Berca Group); Siti was listed as one of Forbes Asia's 50 Power Businesswomen, 2012
Sofjan Wanandi	林绵坤	1941-	West Sumatra, Indonesia		Founder, Gemala Group
Prajogo Pangestu (Phang Joen Phen)	彭雲鵬 彭云鹏	1944-	West Kalimantan, Indonesia	Lufeng, Guangdong	Timber tycoon; Pangestu is ranked 41st richest in Indonesia, Forbes, 2014
Djoko Susanto (Kwok Kwie Fo)	郭贵和	1950-	Jakarta, Indonesia		Founder and CEO, Alfa Mart; Susanto is ranked 22nd richest in Indonesia, Forbes, 2015
Tomy Winata	郭說鋒 郭说锋	1958-	West Kalimantan, Indonesia		Founder and chairman, Artha Graha Group; Winata is ranked 35th richest in Indonesia, Forbes, 2006

=== South Africa ===
Name (Hakka name)	Chinese writing	Birth-Death	Born	Ancestry	Description
Cain Fat Hendson	李鏗發	1929–	Meixian, Guangdong	Meixian, Guangdong	Founder, Tao Ying Metal Industries, Panda Paraffin Stoves, Diamond Electric Stoves in South Africa

=== Thailand ===
Name (Hakka name)	Chinese writing	Birth-Death	Born	Ancestry	Description
Choti Lamsam	伍捷仆	1904–1948	Meixian, Guangdong	Meixian, Guangdong	Founder, Thai Farmers Bank, now known as Kasikorn Bank; Lamsam's grandson, Banthoon, is ranked 21st richest in Thailand, Forbes, 2014
Kiat Wattanavekin	丘細見	1908–2013	Fengshun, Guangdong	Fengshun, Guangdong	Founder, Kiatnakin Bank; Wattanavekin's surviving wife, Chansamorn, and family is ranked 43rd richest in Thailand, Forbes, 2014

=== India ===
Name (Hakka name)	Chinese writing	Birth-Death	Born	Ancestry	Description
Nelson Wang	黃玉堂 黄玉堂	1950-	Kolkata, India	Guangdong	Founder and chairman, China Garden Restaurant Group; Creator of the Chicken Manchurian Indian-Chinese cuisine; China Garden has been voted as one of the best restaurants in Asia from amongst establishments surveyed in 80 cities in 23 countries

=== United Kingdom ===
Name (Hakka name)	Chinese writing	Birth-Death	Born	Ancestry	Description
Woon Wing Yip (Yap Fon Yin)	葉煥榮 叶焕荣	1940-	Dongguan, Guangdong	Dongguan, Guangdong	Founder and chairman, Wing Yip Group; first Chinese tycoon in United Kingdom
Alan Yau (Hiew Tet Wui)	丘德威	1962-	Hong Kong	Fengshun, Guangdong	Founder, Wagamama restaurant chain and the Hakkasan and Yauatcha restaurants, both of which have been ranked among "The World's 50 Best Restaurants" by the British magazine, Restaurant

=== United States ===
Name (Hakka name)	Chinese writing	Birth-Death	Born	Ancestry	Description
Vincent Chin		1937–2003	Kingston, Jamaica	Guangdong	Founder, VP Records, the world's largest independent label and distributor of Caribbean music
Patrick Soon-Shiong	黄馨祥	1952-	Port Elizabeth, South Africa	Taishan, Guangdong	Entrepreneur and philanthropist; Richest Asian American in history; Soon-Shiong is ranked 37th richest in USA, Forbes, 2015

=== Canada ===
Name (Hakka name)	Chinese writing	Birth-Death	Born	Ancestry	Description
G. Raymond Chang		1948–2014	Kingston, Jamaica	Guangdong	Philanthropist; Chancellor, Ryerson University, Toronto, 2006–2012
Michael Lee-Chin	李秦	1951-	Port Antonio, Jamaica	Guangdong	Business magnate; Lee-Chin was ranked 365th in the world on Forbes Billionaires List, 2006; Both of his grandfathers were Hakka Chinese and grandmothers Afro-Caribbean Jamaicans, his surname Lee-Chin is a combination of both his grandfathers' surnames

=== Suriname ===
Name (Hakka name)	Chinese writing	Birth-Death	Born	Ancestry	Description
Eduard Tjin-Kon-Fat		1871–1930	Suriname	Guangdong	Influential tycoon
Rudolf Tjin-A-Djie		1880–1962	Albina, Suriname	Guangdong	Influential tycoon

== Sportspersons ==
=== China ===
Name (Hakka name)	Chinese writing	Birth-Death	Born	Ancestry	Description
Ye Qiaobo (Yap Kiau Poh)	葉喬波 叶乔波	1964-	Changchun, Jilin	Hexian, Guangxi	Winner, World Sprint Speed Skating Championships, 1992 and 1993; first Chinese speed skater to become world champion; China's first medalist at Winter Olympics, 1992
Xie Yuxin (Chia Yuk Sin)	謝育新 谢育新	1968-	Xingning, Guangdong	Xingning, Guangdong	National footballer, 1987–1996; first China footballer to play professional football overseas, 1987; Held the record for being the youngest footballer, 1987–1996, at the age of 18 and youngest scorer, 1988–2003, at the age of 19, for the China national football team
Xu Yanmei	许艳梅	1971-	Ganzhou, Jiangxi	Ganzhou, Jiangxi	Gold medalist, Diving (10 Metre Platform), 1988 Seoul Olympics; Xu was awarded the "Best Sportsperson since the founding of the People's Republic of China" in 1989
Sun Caiyun (Soon Choi Yun)	孫彩雲 孙彩云	1973-	Shenzhen	Shenzhen	First official world record holder, Women's Pole vault, 1992–1995
Li Li	李莉	1975-	Xingning, Guangdong	Xingning, Guangdong	Artistic gymnast; In 1990 at the Goodwill Games in Seattle, USA, Li wowed the world with her 1 1/4 back spin on the beam; This exceptionally difficult and innovative 1 1/4 turn on back in kip position technique has since been named after her, and no other gymnast has been able to perform the maneuver with as many spins
Xian Dongmei	冼东妹	1975-	Zhaoqing, Guangdong	Zhaoqing, Guangdong	Gold medalist, Judo (Half-lightweight), 2004 Athens Olympics and 2008 Beijing Olympics
Chen Hong (Chen Fen)	陳宏 陈宏	1979-	Longyan, Fujian	Longyan, Fujian	Ranked world number one badminton player, 2002–2003; Winner, All England Open Badminton Championships, 2002 and 2005
Chen Qiuqi	陳秋綺 陈秋绮	1980-	Meixian, Guangdong	Meixian, Guangdong	Gold medalist, Women's Hockey, 2006 Asian Games, Doha
Fu Haifeng	傅海峰	1983-	Jieyang, Guangdong	Liancheng, Fujian	Considered to be the most successful men's doubles badminton player of all time; Gold medalist, Badminton (Men's Doubles), 2012 London Olympics; Winner (Men's Doubles), World Badminton Championships, 2006, 2009, 2010 and 2011
Lin Dan (Lim Dan)	林丹	1983-	Longyan, Fujian	Longyan, Fujian	Considered to be the greatest badminton player of all time; Gold medalist, Badminton (Men's Singles), 2008 Beijing Olympics and 2012 London Olympics; Winner, World Badminton Championships, 2006, 2007, 2009, 2011 and 2013; Winner, All England Open Badminton Championships, 2004, 2006, 2007, 2009, 2012 and 2016
Yang Jinghui (Yong Kin Fui)	楊景輝 杨景辉	1983-	Guangzhou, Guangdong	Guangxi	Gold medalist, Diving (Synchronized Diving), 2004 Athens Olympics
Zhu Fangyu	朱芳雨	1983-	Liuzhou, Guangxi	Meixian, Guangdong	Gold medalist, Men's Basketball, 2006 Asian Games, Doha and 2010 Asian Games, Guangzhou; Gold medalist, Men's Basketball, 2011 FIBA Asia Championship, Wuhan; first and only three-time Chinese Basketball Association (CBA) Regular Season Most Valuable Player, 2007–08, 2009–10 and 2011–12; first and only four-time CBA Finals Most Valuable Player, 2004–05, 2007–08, 2008–09 and 2009–10; In 2013, Zhu became the first player to score 9000 points in CBA history, making him the league's highest ever scorer
Han Ling	韩玲	1985-	Bobai, Guangxi	Bobai, Guangxi	Gold medalist, Women's 4 × 100 metres relay, 2006 Asian Games, Doha
Lao Yi	劳义	1985-	Hepu, Guangxi	Hepu, Guangxi	Gold medalist, Men's 100 metres, 2010 Asian Games, Guangzhou; first and only China athlete to win the 100 metres event at Asian Games; Lao also anchored the 4 × 100 metres relay team to another gold with a new Asian Games record and Chinese national record
He Wenna (Ho Vun Na)	何雯娜	1989-	Longyan, Fujian	Dabu, Guangdong	Gold medalist, Gymnastics (Trampoline), 2008 Beijing Olympics; Gold medalist, Gymnastics, Trampoline World Championships, 2011; Gold medalist, Gymnastics (Women's Team), Trampoline World Championships, 2007, 2009 and 2011
Luo Yutong	罗玉通	1989-	Huizhou, Guangdong	Huizhou, Guangdong	Gold medalist, Diving (Synchronized Diving), 2012 London Olympics; Gold medalist, World Aquatics Championships, 2007 and 2011
Jiang Yuyuan	江鈺源 江钰源	1991-	Liuzhou, Guangxi	Yunan, Guangdong	Gold medalist, Gymnastics (Women's Team), 2008 Beijing Olympics
Yang Yilin	楊伊琳 杨伊琳	1992-	Huadu, Guangdong	Huadu, Guangdong	Gold medalist, Gymnastics (Women's Team), 2008 Beijing Olympics
Zhang Yanquan	張雁全 张雁全	1994-	Chaozhou, Guangdong	Dabu, Guangdong	Gold medalist, Diving (Men's synchronized 10 metre platform), 2012 London Olympics

=== Taiwan ===
Name (Hakka name)	Chinese writing	Birth-Death	Born	Ancestry	Description
Kuo Lee Chien-fu	郭李建夫	1969-	Taoyuan, Taiwan		Silver medalist, Baseball, 1992 Barcelona Olympics; Kuo Lee was best known for being the ace pitcher in the Chinese Taipei national baseball team in the 1992 Olympics where he was twice the winning pitcher in the two matches against Japan (one in the preliminary round and the other in the semifinal), which led the Chinese Taipei team win its first and only baseball silver medal
Chu Mu-yen (Chu Muk Yen)	朱木炎	1982-	Taoyuan, Taiwan		Gold medalist, Taekwondo, 2004 Athens Olympics; Gold medalist, World Taekwondo Championships, 2003
Lee Hsueh-Lin	李學林 李学林	1984-	Pingtung, Taiwan	Meixian, Guangdong	First and only Taiwanese to win Chinese Basketball Association Finals Most Valuable Player, 2011–12; Lee is also known as the Allen Iverson of Taiwan
Hsieh Su-wei	謝淑薇 谢淑薇	1986-	Hsinchu, Taiwan		Tennis player; Winner (Women's Doubles), Wimbledon Championships, 2013; Winner, (Women's Doubles), French Open, 2014
Latisha Chan (Chan Yung-jan)	詹詠然	1989-	Dongshi, Taiwan		Tennis player; Winner (Women's Doubles), US Open, 2017; Winner (Mixed Doubles), French Open, 2018, 2019; Winner (Mixed Doubles), Wimbledon Championships, 2019
Chan Hao-ching	詹皓晴	1993-	Dongshi, Taiwan		Tennis player; Finalist (Women's Doubles), Wimbledon Championships, 2017; Finalist (Mixed Doubles), Wimbledon Championships, 2014; Finalist (Mixed Doubles), US Open, 2017, 2019

=== Hong Kong ===
Name (Hakka name)	Chinese writing	Birth-Death	Born	Ancestry	Description
Lee Wai Tong (Lee Fui Tong)	李惠堂	1905–1979	Hong Kong	Wuhua, Guangdong	Considered to be the greatest footballer to play for China and one of the greatest footballers in Asia in the first half of the 20th century; Captain, China national football team, 1936 Berlin Olympics

=== Malaysia ===
Name (Hakka name)	Chinese writing	Birth-Death	Born	Ancestry	Description
Wong Mew Choo	黄妙珠	1983-	Perak, Malaysia		Gold medalist, Badminton (Mixed Team), 2006 Commonwealth Games, Melbourne and 2010 Commonwealth Games, Delhi

=== Indonesia ===
Name (Hakka name)	Chinese writing	Birth-Death	Born	Ancestry	Description
Susi Susanti	王蓮香 王莲香	1971-	West Java, Indonesia		Gold medalist, Badminton (Women's Singles), 1992 Barcelona Olympics; Winner, World Badminton Championships, 1993; Winner, All-England Championships, 1990, 1991, 1993 and 1994; only female badminton player to hold the Olympic, World Championship and All-England singles titles simultaneously
Nathan Tjoe-A-On		2001-	Rotterdam, Netherlands		Dutch-Indonesian footballer

=== Netherlands ===
Name (Hakka name)	Chinese writing	Birth-Death	Born	Ancestry	Description
Aron Winter		1967-	Paramaribo, Suriname	Guangdong	Member of Netherlands national football team that won the 1988 European Football Championship; Also represented Netherlands in the European Football Championship for 1996 and 2000, and FIFA World Cup, 1990, 1994 and 1998; Winter is of mixed blood and his paternal grandfather, Zhang Junqiang, is Surinamese Hakka

=== United States ===
Name (Hakka name)	Chinese writing	Birth-Death	Born	Ancestry	Description
Mark Chung	马克.钟	1970-	Toronto, Canada	Guangdong	First Chinese-American soccer player to represent the U.S., 1988–1992

=== Trinidad and Tobago ===
Name (Hakka name)	Chinese writing	Birth-Death	Born	Ancestry	Description
Ellis Achong		1904–1986	Port of Spain, Trinidad and Tobago	Guangdong	First and only Chinese cricket player to play in a Test match, West Indies, 1930–1935
Rupert Tang Choon		1914–1985	Sangre Grande, Trinidad and Tobago	Guangdong	First Chinese Captain, Trinidad cricket team, 1951–1952

== Actors, musicians and beauty queens ==
=== China ===
Name (Hakka name)	Chinese writing	Birth-Death	Born	Ancestry	Description
Huang Wanqiu (Vong Van Ciu)	黄婉秋	1943–	Guilin, Guangxi	Meixian, Guangdong	Actress; Lead actress of the classic film, "Third Sister Liu" (刘三姐), which mesmerized Chinese audiences worldwide

=== Taiwan ===
Name (Hakka name)	Chinese writing	Birth-Death	Born	Ancestry	Description
Teng Yu-hsien (Thien Yee Hen)	鄧雨賢 邓雨贤	1906–1944	Taoyuan, Taiwan	Jiaoling, Guangdong	Famous composer; Regarded as the Father of Taiwanese folk songs
Hou Hsiao-hsien (Heu Hau Hian)	侯孝賢 侯孝贤	1947–	Meixian, Guangdong	Meixian, Guangdong	Award-winning film director; Hou has four films (the highest number for any director) selected as the "100 Greatest Chinese Films of the 20th Century" by Yazhou Zhoukan (Asia Weekly), two of which are in Hakka/Mandarin: A Summer at Grandpa's (冬冬的假期), 1984 and A Time to Live, A Time to Die (童年往事), 1985
Edward Yang (Rhong Det Chong)	楊德昌 杨德昌	1947–2007	Shanghai	Meixian, Guangdong	Film director; Best Director, Cannes Film Festival, 2000; Yang has three films selected as the "100 Greatest Chinese Films of the 20th Century" by Yazhou Zhoukan (Asia Weekly)
Chen Ying-git	陳盈潔	1953-	Hsinchu, Taiwan		Singer, 1980s-1990s
Dick Wei	狄威	1953-	Pingtung, Taiwan	Nanchang, Jiangxi	Action and martial arts film actor
Lo Ta-yu (Lo Tai Rhiu)	羅大佑 罗大佑	1954-	Miaoli, Taiwan	Meixian, Guangdong	Influential singer-songwriter who revolutionized Chinese pop and rock music in the 1980s
Chung Mong-hong	鍾孟宏	1965-	Pingtung, Taiwan		Film director; Best director, Golden Horse Awards, 2010
Sam Tseng	曾国城	1968-	Pingtung, Taiwan		Television presenter; Best television presenter, Golden Bell Awards, 2006, 2011 and 2014
Vincent Fang	方文山	1969-	Hualien, Taiwan	Yudu, Jiangxi	Lyricist best known for his collaboration with singer-songwriter Jay Chou; Best Lyricist, 19th Golden Melody Awards, 2008
Julia Peng (Pang Ga Fui)	彭佳慧	1972-	Pingtung, Taiwan	Meixian, Guangdong	Singer; The chorus of Peng's song, "Love Words of Moon" (月儿弯), 2009, is in Hakka
Wen Shang-yi	溫尚翊	1976-	Hsinchu, Taiwan		Leader, Mayday rock band; Better known as "Monster" (怪兽)
Alec Su (Su Rhiu Pen)	蘇有朋 苏有朋	1973-	Taipei, Taiwan	Nanchang, Jiangxi	Actor and singer
Bowie Tsang (Lim Hiao Pui)	曾寶儀 曾宝仪	1973-	Hong Kong	Wuhua, Guangdong	Television presenter, singer and actress; Tsang is the lead actress in the Hakka television drama, "Legend of Din Tai Fung" (十里桂花香), 2009
Blackie Chen (Chin Kian Zhiu)	陳建洲 陈建洲	1977-	Kaohsiung, Taiwan	Meixian, Guangdong	Television presenter; Chen was a former professional basketball player and played for the Chinese Taipei national basketball team, 1998–1999
Ehlo Huang	黃玉榮 黃玉荣	1977-	Hualien, Taiwan		Actor and singer; Member, 183 Club pop group
Jerry Yan	言承旭	1977-	Taoyuan, Taiwan		Actor and singer; Member of F4 boyband which is hugely popular across Asia
James Wen	溫昇豪 温升豪	1978-	Kaohsiung, Taiwan	Meixian, Guangdong	Actor and model; Lead actor in the Hakka film 1895 (1895乙未), 2008
Joe Chen	陳喬恩 陈乔恩	1979-	Hsinchu, Taiwan		Actress, singer and model; Known as the Queen of idol dramas
Shino Lin (Lim Hiao Pui)	林曉培 林晓培	1979-	Pingtung, Taiwan	Guangdong	Rock singer
Ella Chen (Chin Ga Fa)	陳嘉樺 陈嘉桦	1981-	Pingtung, Taiwan	Meixian, Guangdong	Member of S.H.E, the most successful female pop group in Chinese music
Hebe Tien (Tian Fuk Zhin)	田馥甄	1983-	Hsinchu, Taiwan	Zhangzhou, Fujian	Member of S.H.E.; Hebe uses Hakka to promote Hsinchu's "Taiwan Comics Dream Park" (台湾漫画梦工厂) in a music video, 2014
Roy Chiu	邱澤 邱泽	1981-	Taipei, Taiwan		Actor, singer and Formula One driver
Miu Chu	朱俐靜	1981-	Hsinchu, Taiwan		Singer; Winner, Taiwan Super Idol, Season 3
Angela Chang	張韶涵 张韶涵	1982-	Hsinchu, Taiwan		Singer and actress
Eddie Peng	彭于晏	1982-	Taipei, Taiwan	Meixian, Guangdong	Actor
Joanna Wang	王若琳	1988-	Taipei, Taiwan		Singer-songwriter
Qiu Sheng Yi	邱勝翊	1989-	Taichung, Taiwan		Member, JPM boyband; Better known as "Wang Zi" (王子)
Qiu Yi Cheng	邱翊橙	1990-	Taichung, Taiwan		Member, JPM boyband; Better known as "Mao Di" (毛弟)

=== Hong Kong ===
Name (Hakka name)	Chinese writing	Birth-Death	Born	Ancestry	Description
Chor Yuen (Cho Nyen)	楚原	1934-	Guangzhou, Guangdong	Meixian, Guangdong	Film director, screenwriter and actor; Chor's directed film, All These Pitiable Parents (可怜天下父母心), 1961, is selected as the "100 Greatest Chinese Films of the 20th Century" by Yazhou Zhoukan (Asia Weekly); Chor's real name is Cheung Po-Kin (张宝坚)
Chan Wai-man (Chin Fui Men)	陳惠敏 陈惠敏	1946-	Hong Kong	Wuhua, Guangdong	Actor who is well known for triad chief roles; Chan is known to have triad background; He spoke Hakka in the film Triads: The Inside Story (我在黑社会的日子), 1989
Deanie Ip (Yap Tet Han)	葉德嫻 叶德娴	1947-	Shenzhen	Huiyang, Guangdong	Actress and singer; Best Actress, Hong Kong Film Awards, 2012
Frances Yip (Yap Lee Ngee)	葉麗儀 叶丽仪	1947-	Hong Kong	Huiyang, Guangdong	Famous singer who has performed in more than thirty countries on five continents
Gong Xuehua	宫雪花	1948-	Shanghai	Yongding, Fujian	Actress; first winner, Miss China France at the age of 36
Richard Lam (Lam Tsen Keong)	林振強	1949–2003	Hong Kong	Huizhou, Guangdong	Famous lyricist
Lo Mang	羅莽 罗莽	1952-	Hong Kong	Huiyang, Guangdong	Actor; Well known for his martial arts background, Lo started as a lead actor in several Shaw Brothers films in the latter part of the 1970s and early 1980s
Eric Tsang (Tsen Tsi Vui)	曾志偉 曾志伟	1953-	Hong Kong	Wuhua, Guangdong	Actor, film director, producer and television presenter; Best Actor, Hong Kong Film Awards, 1992; In 2013, Tsang led a group of Hong Kong Hakka television celebrities to visit Meizhou and Huizhou, and was the main host in a Hong Kong TVB Hakka variety show
Shing Fui-On (Sin Kui On)	成奎安	1955–2009	Hong Kong	Xingning, Guangdong	Actor who is well known for baddie roles; Also known as "Big Fool" (大傻); Shing was elected the village head of his Hakka Nam Wai Village in Sai Kung District for five consecutive years from 2003 to 2007; He has spoken Hakka in some of his films
Leslie Cheung (Chong Ket Yin)	張國榮 张国荣	1956–2003	Hong Kong	Meixian, Guangdong	Famous singer and actor; Best Actor, Hong Kong Film Awards, 1991; Cheung spoke Hakka in the Miss Hong Kong Pageant television show, 1986
Alex Man (Man Tse Leong)	萬梓良 万梓良	1957-	Hong Kong	Bao'an, Guangdong	Actor; Best Actor, Golden Horse Awards, 1988; Man sang the Hakka song, "客家山歌最出名", during a Hong Kong TVB television show specially made for him
Hsiao Hou	小侯	1958-	Meixian, Guangdong	Meixian, Guangdong	Martial arts actor and action choreographer; Hou's real name is 侯耀中 (Hou Yao-chung)
Teresa Cheung (Chong Tet Lan)	張德蘭 张德兰	1959-	Hong Kong	Dabu, Guangdong	Popular singer in the late 1970s-1980s
Cherie Chung (Tsung Cho Fung)	鍾楚紅 钟楚紅	1960-	Hong Kong	Boluo, Guangdong	One of the top film actresses in the 1980s-early 1990s
Charlene Tse (Chia Nin)	謝寧 谢宁	1963-	Guangzhou, Guangdong	Meixian, Guangdong	Actress; Winner, Miss Hong Kong, 1985
Yammie Lam	藍潔瑛 蓝洁瑛	1964-	Hong Kong	Chaozhou, Guangdong	Television actress
Prudence Liew (Liew Mui Kiun)	劉美君 刘美君	1964-	Hong Kong	Xinhui, Guangdong	Singer and actress; Best Actress, Golden Horse Awards, 2008; Liew spoke Hakka in the HKTV television drama, "Hakka Sisters" (客家女人)
Leon Lai (Lai Min)	黎明	1966-	Beijing	Meixian, Guangdong	Actor and singer; Best Actor, Golden Horse Awards, 2002; Lai's father is Indonesian Hakka
Rachel Lee (Lee Lee Tsin)	李麗珍 李丽珍	1966-	Hong Kong	Meixian, Guangdong	Film actress; Best Actress, Golden Horse Awards, 1999; Lee's parents are Indonesian Hakkas
Jackie Lui	呂頌賢 吕颂贤	1966-	Hong Kong	Dongguan, Guangdong	Actor
Jordan Chan (Chin Siau Chun)	陳小春 陈小春	1967-	Hong Kong	Huiyang, Guangdong	Actor and singer; Chan has spoken Hakka in some of his films; He is the first singer to include Hakka in a Mandarin song, "Heartless You", (算你恨), 2003
Louis Yuen	阮兆祥	1967-	Hong Kong		Actor and television presenter
Wallis Pang	彭子晴	1973-	Hong Kong		Television actress
Eric Suen (Soon Yau Vui)	孫耀威	1973-	Hong Kong	Chaozhou, Guangdong	Singer and actor
Wallace Chung	鍾漢良 钟汉良	1974-	Hong Kong	Huiyang, Guangdong	Actor and singer
Jason Chan	陳智燊 陈智燊	1977-	London, United Kingdom	Guangdong	Television presenter and actor
Lee San-san	李珊珊	1977-	Hong Kong	Meixian, Guangdong	Actress; Winner, Miss Hong Kong, 1996
Kay Tse	謝安琪 谢安琪	1977-	Hong Kong	Guangdong	Singer-songwriter; Tse is the first singer to include Hakka in a Cantonese song, "C餐", 2014
Pong Nan	藍奕邦 蓝奕邦	1978-	Hong Kong		Singer-songwriter
Shirley Yeung (Rhong Sih Ki)	楊思琦 杨思琦	1978-	Hong Kong	Jiaoling, Guangdong	Actress; Winner, Miss Hong Kong, 2001; Hold the record for winning six awards at the Miss Hong Kong pageant
Ella Koon	官恩娜	1979 –	Tahiti, French Polynesia	Bao'an, Guangdong	Singer and actress
Derek Tsang	曾國祥 曾国祥	1979-	Wuhua, Guangdong	Wuhua, Guangdong	Actor and film director
Kate Tsui (Chee Tse San)	徐子珊	1979-	Hong Kong	Boluo, Guangdong	Actress; Winner, Miss Hong Kong, 2004
Shermon Tang (Ten Song Vun)	鄧上文 邓上文	1983-	Hong Kong	Huiyang, Guangdong	Actress; Miss Photogenic, Miss Hong Kong, 2005
Stephy Tang	鄧麗欣 邓丽欣	1983-	Hong Kong	Dongguan, Guangdong	Singer and actress
Chow Yun-fat	周潤發 周润发	1955-	Hong Kong		Actor

=== Singapore ===
Name (Hakka name)	Chinese writing	Birth-Death	Born	Ancestry	Description
Huang Qing Yuan (Wong Tshin Yen)	黄清元	1945-	Singapore	Dabu, Guangdong	Singer, 1960s-1970s; Known as the "Elvis Presley of Singapore"; first person in Singapore/Malaysia to record in a recording studio, and thus the first person to release a gramophone record; Huang's album in 1966, "Man Li' (蔓莉), sold 250 000 copies in Singapore/Malaysia, way surpassed the records of Stefanie Sun and Fish Leong
Marcus Chin (Chin Kian Bin)	陈建彬	1954-	Singapore	Dabu, Guangdong	Actor, singer, television presenter and radio DJ
Maggie Theng (Ten Miao Fah)	鄧妙華 邓妙华	1960-	Singapore		Singer, 1970s-1980s; first Singaporean and first person from South-east Asia to break into the Taiwan pop music scene in the 1980s; Her song "牵引" was the Number One song in Taiwan in 1982
Xie Shaoguang (Chia Sheu Guong)	謝韶光 谢韶光	1960-	Singapore	Heshan, Guangdong	Actor; Best Actor, Asian Television Awards, 1998; Best Actor, Star Awards, 1996, 1998, 1999, 2003 and 2004
Lee Wei Song (Li Vui Siung)	李偉菘 李伟菘	1966-	Singapore	Dabu, Guangdong	Music producer and songwriter; Together with twin brother, Si Song, they are two of the most prolific music producers in Asia, having produced superstars like Stefanie Sun and JJ Lin
Lee Si Song (Lee Sze Siung)	李偲菘	1966-	Singapore	Dabu, Guangdong	Twin brother of Lee Wei Song; Music producer and songwriter
Adrian Pang (Pang Yau Soon)	彭耀順 彭耀顺	1966-	Malacca, Malaysia		Television, film and theatre actor; Best Actor for Comedy Performance, Asian Television Awards, 2002
James Lye (Lai Hin Seong)	賴興祥 赖兴祥	1969-	Singapore		Television and film actor
Cavin Soh (Soo Tsi Sin)	蘇智誠 苏智诚	1970-	Singapore		Actor, singer and television presenter; Part of Soh's thank you speech was in Hakka when he received the award for Best Supporting Actor, Star Awards, 2005
Fann Wong (Fam Voon Fong)	范文芳	1971-	Singapore	Huizhou, Guangdong	Actress, singer and model; first Singaporean in a major role in a Hollywood film, "Shanghai Knights", 2003; Best Actress, Star Awards, 1995
Ho Yeow Sun (Ho Yau San)	何耀珊	1972-	Singapore		Singer; Ho performed the Olympic Hymn, which was sung in Mandarin for the first time, accompanied by a choir of Overseas Chinese from 16 different nationalities for the 2008 Beijing Olympics
Wong Lilin (Wong Lee Lin)	黃麗玲 黄丽玲	1972-	Singapore		Actress and television presenter
Chai Yee Wei (Chai Yee Vui)	蔡于位	1976-	Singapore		Film director most famous for the film, "That Girl in Pinafore" (我的朋友, 我的同学, 我爱过的一切)
Michelle Chong (Chong Mi Set)	莊米雪 庄米雪	1977-	Singapore		Film director, actress and television presenter
Shaun Chen	陳泓宇	1978-	Negeri Sembilan, Malaysia	Guangdong	Actor; Best Actor, Star Awards, 2015; Chen spoke Hakka in the film Men in White (鬼啊鬼啊), 2007
Julian Hee (Hee Lip Fah)	许立桦	1978-	Singapore		Actor and model; Winner, Manhunt Singapore, 2002
Wong Jing Lun	黃靖倫 黄靖伦	1983-	Singapore	Dabu, Guangdong	Singer, actor and television host
Felicia Chin (Chin Fung Lin)	陳鳳玲 陈凤玲	1984-	Singapore		Actress; Female winner, Star Search, 2003; Youngest member of the Singapore national softball team at the age of 15, 2000
Nat Ho	鹤天赐	1984-	Singapore		Actor and singer
Bonnie Loo (Lo Mui Yee)	罗美仪	1994-	Perak, Malaysia		Singer and actress; Winner, Campus Superstar, 2013
Carrie Wong	黄思恬	1994-	Singapore		Actress

=== Malaysia ===
Name (Hakka name)	Chinese writing	Birth-Death	Born	Ancestry	Description
Eric Moo (Muu Ki Hien)	巫啟賢 巫启贤	1963-	Perak, Malaysia	Dongguan, Guangdong	Singer-songwriter; one of the pioneers of Xinyao, a genre of songs about life in Singapore
Michael Wong (Vong Guong Liong)	王光良	1970-	Perak, Malaysia	Fengshun, Guangdong	Singer-songwriter; Wong acted in the Taiwan Hakka television drama, "Wintry 2" (寒夜续曲), 2003
Wong Kew Lit	黄巧力	1971-	Malaysia		Film director and producer; Wong's Malaysian Chinese historical film, "The New Village" (新村), which carry Hakka dialogue, is banned in Malaysia as some politicians had claimed that it glorified Communism
Victor Wong (Vong Pin Guan)	黄品冠	1972-	Selangor, Malaysia	Jiexi, Guangdong	Singer-songwriter; The MV of Wong's song, "漂流", was filmed at his ancestral village – Liancheng Village, Pingshang Town, Jiexi County, Guangdong (广东省, 揭西县, 坪上镇, 连城村)
Penny Tai (Dai Pui Nee)	戴佩妮	1978-	Johor, Malaysia	Haifeng, Guangdong	Singer-songwriter; Best Female Mandarin Singer, 25th Golden Melody Awards, 2014
Gary Chaw (Co Get)	曹格	1979-	Sabah, Malaysia	Guangdong	Singer; Best Male Mandarin Singer, 19th Golden Melody Awards, 2008
Stella Chung	鍾曉玉 钟晓玉	1981-	Sarawak, Malaysia	Guangdong	Actress and singer
Nicholas Teo	張棟樑 张栋梁	1981-	Sarawak, Malaysia		Singer; Winner, Astro Talent Quest, 2002
Jess Lee	李佳薇	1988-	Negri Sembilan, Malaysia	Meixian, Guangdong	Singer; first and only Malaysian Winner, One Million Star (超級星光大道) (7th Season), Taiwan
Moo Yan Yee	巫恩儀 巫恩仪	1988-	Perak, Malaysia		Actress; Winner, Miss Malaysia Global Beauty Queen, 2007

=== Indonesia ===
Name (Hakka name)	Chinese writing	Birth-Death	Born	Ancestry	Description
Teguh Karya		1937–2001	Banten, Indonesia		Famous film director behind several critically acclaimed films
Delon Thamrin		1978-	Jakarta, Indonesia		Winner, Indonesian Idol, Season 1, 2004
Sandra Dewi		1983-	Bangka-Belitung, Indonesia		Actress and model
Agnez Mo	楊詩曼 杨诗曼	1986-	Jakarta, Indonesia	Meixian, Guangdong	Versatile singer and actress; Mo hold the record for being the Indonesian singer who have received the most number of singing awards

=== Japan ===
Name (Hakka name)	Chinese writing	Birth-Death	Born	Ancestry	Description
Kimiko Yo	余貴美子	1956-	Kanagawa Prefecture, Japan	Guangdong	Award-winning Japanese actress of Republic of China nationality; Yo's father, of surname "Yu" (余), is Taiwanese Hakka and mother is Japanese; Yo's father is also the founder of the Hakka Association in Japan

=== United Kingdom ===
Name (Hakka name)	Chinese writing	Birth-Death	Born	Ancestry	Description
Phil Chen			Kingston, Jamaica	Guangdong	Session bassist who is best known for his work with Ray Manzarek and Robby Krieger of The Doors
Andy Chung			Kirkcaldy, Scotland, United Kingdom	Guangdong	Popular Scottish folk singer who is influenced by Hakka folk music

=== United States ===
Name (Hakka name)	Chinese writing	Birth-Death	Born	Ancestry	Description
Angelin Chang	張安麟		Indiana, USA		First American woman Grammy-Award-winning classical pianist
Clive Chin		1954-	Kingston, Jamaica	Guangdong	Pioneer in the establishment of dub as a standalone musical form
Dyana Liu		1981-	Taipei, Taiwan		Actress best known for the television series, Tower Prep, as Suki Sato, 2010
Monica Pang	彭麗萍 彭丽萍	1981-	Georgia, United States	Guangdong	First Asian-American to win Miss Georgia, 2005; Runner-up, Miss America, 2006
MC Jin	歐陽靖 欧阳靖	1982-	Florida, USA	Guangdong	Rapper, songwriter and actor; first Asian-American rapper to be signed by a major record label; Jin's real name is Jin Au-Yeung

=== Jamaica ===
Name (Hakka name)	Chinese writing	Birth-Death	Born	Ancestry	Description
Byron Lee	拜伦·李	1935-2008	Manchester Parish, Jamaica	Guangdong	Leader of the Byron Lee and the Dragonaires band, which played a crucial pioneering role in bringing Caribbean music to the world; Lee's father is Hakka and his mother is Afro-Jamaican
Patsy Yuen		1952-	Kingston, Jamaica	Guangdong	Winner, Miss Jamaica World, 1973; Second runner-up, Miss World, 1973
Tami Chynn	陈黛美	1984-	Kingston, Jamaica	Guangdong	Singer, songwriter and dancer; Chynn's father is of Hakka and Cherokee descent
Tessanne Chin	陈黛姗	1985-	Kingston, Jamaica	Guangdong	Singer who is best known for winning Season 5 of NBC's reality TV singing competition The Voice, 2013; Chin's father is of Hakka and Cherokee descent

=== Vietnam ===
Name (Hakka name)	Chinese writing	Birth-Death	Born	Ancestry	Description
La Hối	羅允正	1920–1945	Hội An, Quảng Nam	Dongguan, Guangdong	Musician, composer of "Xuân và tuổi trẻ" (Spring and Youth), executed by the Japanese in 1945
