= Li Hejun =

Chinese businessman (born 1967)

- 李河君
- Born: 13 August 1967 (age 59); Heyuan, Guangdong, China
- Education: Beijing Jiaotong University
- Occupations: Founder and chairman, Hanergy
- Spouse: Wu Wei

Li Hejun (Chinese: 李河君; born 13 August 1967) is a Chinese businessman. He is a former billionaire. He is the founder and chairman of Hanergy, as well as a member of the 11th/12th CPPCC National Committee, member of All-China Federation of Industry and Commerce's (ACFIC) First Advisory Committee, vice-chairman of ACFIC's 11th Executive Committee and honorary president of ACFIC's New Energy Chamber of Commerce.

According to Forbes, Li had a net worth of $10.3 billion in March 2014, $21.1 billion in March 2015, $3.2 billion in March 2016, $1.9 billion in March 2017.

In December 2022, Li was detained by police in northeast China's Liaoning province.

== Early life ==
Li Hejun was born on 13 August 1967, to a Hakka family in Heyuan, Guangdong Province, China. Li graduated from Beijing Jiaotong University in 1988 with a BS (Bachelor of Science) degree in mechanical engineering. In 2002, he started his doctoral studies at University of Cambridge in Macroeconomics.

== Business career ==
In 1989, Li Hejun borrowed 50,000 Chinese yuan from his university teacher to establish Hanergy. After almost 30 years, Hanergy has become a multinational renewable energy company, with active business in thin-film solar, wind, and hydropower generation.

From 2002 to 2011, Li led a team of more than 10,000 members to construct Jin'anqiao Hydropower Station, costing more than 20 billion yuan. The 3 million kilowatt-capacity Jinanqiao Hydropower Station was built over the Jinsha River in Yunnan Province, China, at an altitude of more than 2000 meters and with an installed capacity 10% larger than the Gezhouba Dam in China, and 30% larger than the United States' Hoover Dam.

In 2009, Hanergy switched focus to thin-film solar power. From 2010 to 2015, the company invested more than 50 billion yuan on the mergers and acquisitions of Germany's Solibro Hi-Tech GmbH and Solibro Research AB, and United States' MiaSolé, Global Solar Energy and Alta Devices.

In November 2013, Li published his first book, New Energy Revolution: the Power to Change China and the World. In the book, he emphasized that in the future, competition for energy will not be for resources, but for core technology. Li also argues "a combination of thin film power and internet will lead to the third industrial revolution." The English version of this book, China's New Energy Revolution, was published in 2014.

In 2008, he invested and built the largest offshore WuDong wind power plant in Asia From 2002 to 2011, he invested and built Jinanqiao, the world's largest private hydro-power station. From 2015 until now, he has invested to build the largest Thin Film solar energy group. He is the member of All-China Federation of Industry and Commerce's (ACFIC) First Advisory Committee, and the vice-chairman of the 11th Executive Committee of All-China Federation of Industry and Commerce He is the first founding president of the New Energy Chamber of Commerce of the All-China Federation of Industry and Commerce, a lifetime honorary president, a member of the All-China Youth Federation, the vice president of the China Young Entrepreneurs Association, and the permanent honorary president of the Guangdong Hakka Chamber of Commerce. In 2014 and 2015, he was recognized as the richest man in mainland China by New Fortune Magazine. In 2015, he was named as the richest man in mainland China by Forbes and Hurun Fortune.

On 17 December 2022, he was arrested by the Liaoning police.

== Philanthropy ==
During the course of his business career, Li has also launched multiple philanthropic programs. As one of the primary sponsors and the first executive director-general of the China Red Ribbon Foundation (a special fund for AIDS prevention and treatment in China), Li has made contributions to multiple anti-AIDS, education, poverty relief and anti-desertification programs in China and abroad.

== Personal life ==
Li is married, lives in Beijing, China.
