= Jinanqiao =

Jinanqiao or Jin'anqiao (simplified Chinese: 金安桥; traditional Chinese: 金安橋; pinyin: Jīn'ānqiáo) may refer to:

- Jinanqiao Dam, or Jin'anqiao Dam, in Yunnan Province, China
- Jin'anqiao station, a station of Beijing Subway, in China
