= Hanergy =

Chinese solar energy company

Hanergy Holding Group Ltd.
- Native name: 汉能控股集团有限公司
- Type: Private
- Industry: Engineering; Electricity
- Founded: 1989 in Beijing
- Founder: Li Hejun
- Headquarters: Chaoyang District, Beijing, China
- Area served: China, Americas, Europe, Middle East, Asia-Pacific, Africa
- Products: photovoltaic equipment; photovoltaic modules; Electrical power
- Services: construction of photovoltaic power stations, wind farms and hydroelectric power stations
- Number of employees: 15,000+
- Subsidiaries: Hanergy Thin Film Power; Hanergy Mobile Energy; Miasolé; Solibro Hi-Tech; Solibro Research; Global Solar Energy; Alta Devices
- Website: en.hanergythinfilmpower.com

Hanergy Holding Group Ltd. (Hanergy) is a Chinese multinational company headquartered in Beijing. The company is focusing on thin-film solar value chain, including manufacturing and solar parks development. It also owns the Jinanqiao Hydroelectric Power Station and two wind farms. Hanergy is founded and controlled by Li Hejun.

== History ==
Hanergy was founded in September 1989 by Li Hejun, under the name Yuancheng Pulisen Investment Co., Ltd. It changed its name to Hetaihe Economic and Trade Development Co., Ltd. and then Huarui Group, before settling on Hanergy Holding Group in August 2008.

After its founding in 1989, Hanergy was involved in an electronic components business. In 2000, it started the development of the Guangdong Mujing Hydroelectric Power Station, which has an installed capacity of 30 MW and an average annual power production of 107.66 GWh. The company also obtained concessions to build nine more hydroelectric power stations in Yunnan province, but was able to keep control only over the Jinanqiao Hydroelectric Power Station. In 2003, Hanergy marked its entry into wind power with the construction of the Ningxia Helanshan Wind Farm. This was followed by the development of the Jiangsu Rudong Wind Farm in 2006.

In 2009, Hanergy shifted its focus to the thin-film solar industry. It opened its research and development center in Beijing. In 2010, it acquired a controlling stake in the Hong Kong listed Apollo Solar Energy Technology Holdings Ltd., which in 2012, after merging with Hanergy New Energy Research and Development, was renamed Hanergy Solar Group, Ltd. and later Hanergy Thin Film Power Group, Ltd. In 2012, Hanergy acquired glass-based copper indium gallium selenide solar cells thin-film modules manufacturer Solibro from Q-Cells and a copper indium gallium selenide solar cells and cell manufacturing equipment manufacturer MiaSolé. In 2013, it acquired copper indium gallium selenide photovoltaic modules manufacturer Global Solar Energy. In 2014, it acquired a gallium arsenide photovoltaic manufacturer Alta Devices. In 2015, Hanergy established Solibro Hi-Tech GmbH and Solibro Research AB but disposed of its shareholding in Solibro GmbH, which applied for insolvency in 2019.

In September 2012, Hanergy reached an agreement with IKEA to distribute copper indium gallium selenide solar small-scale rooftop photovoltaic systems ("residential kits") in the United Kingdom, expanding into the Netherlands and Switzerland in the following two years. However, in November 2015, IKEA announced that it would no longer be partnering with Hanergy on the project.

In March 2013, Hanergy entered into a photovoltaic energy management contract with FAW-Volkswagen to install rooftop photovoltaic power stations on their plant in Foshan, Guangdong. In April 2014, Hanergy partnered with Tesla to provide thin-film solar technology to power their solar-powered charging stations in Beijing and Shanghai. In June 2014, Hanergy signed a partnership agreement with Aston Martin Racing to use solar power to improve racecar performance at the FIA World Endurance Championship. At the same month, Hanergy signed an agreement to become the official solar energy partner of the Beijing ePrix for the FIA Formula E Championship. In January 2015, Hanergy announced a photovoltaic energy management cooperation with Guangqi Honda to install 17 MW of distributed PV on the rooftops of existing and future factories in Guangzhou, Guangdong.

On May 19, 2015, Hanergy Thin Film Power shares were suspended at the Hong Kong Exchange after crashing by 47%. On May 28, Hong Kong's market regulatory body, the Securities and Futures Commission announced an investigation into the company. On July 15, 2015, the Securities and Futures Commission ordered the suspension of all Hanergy Thin Film Power's shares, a move that prevented the firm from relisting on its own will. On October 23, 2018, Hanergy announced a plan to privatize and relist Hanergy Thin Film Power in mainland China. Hanergy Thin Film Power was delisted from the Hong Kong stock exchange on June 11, 2019. The Beijing Third Intermediate People's Court has confirmed that Hanergy Thin Film Power should sell its 40.48% and 10.88% mortgaged holdings in the Jinanqiao Hydroelectric Power Station. Its main shareholder, another Hanergy's company Hanergy Mobile Energy Holding Group has confirmed that it will bid for these shares.

In November 2015, Hanergy partnered with Dutch football team AZ Alkmaar to provide the club's stadium with solar panels. As part of the deal, Hanergy installed 1,725 panels on the roof of Alkmaar's AFAS Stadion. In May 2017, Hanergy cooperated with leading bike-sharing company, Mobike, to install solar modules to provide the electricity for their smart lock and GPS system. Other than Mobike, Hanergy also signed similar partnerships with MTbike and 99 Bicycle. In December 2017, Hanergy signed a strategic cooperation agreement with Beijing Electric Vehicle (BAIC BJEV) to install thin-film modules on the roofs of vehicles to provide auxiliary power and on electric vehicle charging stations to offer smart battery charging.

In August 2017, Hanergy partnered with Audi to design and integrate their solar cells into panoramic glass roofs to increase the range of Audi electric vehicle by feeding solar energy into internal electrical systems, such as air conditioning and other appliances. In July 2018, Hanergy signed a strategic cooperation agreement with Bolloré to design, manufacture and produce solar electric vehicles. In December 2018, Hanergy partnered with Boeing to provide thin film solar modules for their "Perpetual Aircraft" unmanned aerial vehicle. In April 2019, Hanergy cooperated with NASA to provide 60 ThinSats, Hanergy's solar-powered satellites, for scientific analysis of the atmosphere on their NG-11 mission.

On April 3, 2019, Li Hejun resigned as a director and chairman of the company and transferred his shares to his sisters Li Xue and Li Xia, who control his interest on his behalf.

In May 2019, Hanergy announced a partnership with DHL to become the provider of CIGS flexible solar panels for the rooftops of their commercial vehicles in the UK and Germany. Also in May 2019, Hanergy signed an agreement for a strategic co-operation with Deuter to collaboratively design and develop solar backpacks for the global market. It also signed a strategic cooperation agreement with U.S. Green Building Council to jointly foster the application of thin-film solar power products and technologies in buildings globally. In July 2019, Hanergy signed a strategic partnership with TAM-Europe to integrate flexible thin-film modules and create solar-powered airport shuttle buses.

In January 2020, Solibro Hi-Tech GmbH filed insolvency.

== Operations ==
=== Solar energy ===
Hanergy is focused on the thin-film solar value chain, including manufacturing of solar modules and equipment, and developing of solar parks. It develops copper indium gallium selenide (CIGS), gallium arsenide (GaAs) and silicon heterojunction thin-film technologies. Hanergy also operates as an original equipment manufacturer, manufacturing thin-film components for various companies in the automotive industry. It cooperates with Audi, FAW-Volkswagen, Guangqi Honda, Tesla, and Bolloré, as well as domestic car companies like BAIC. It also works with NASA, Boeing, DHL, Ikea, and Deuter to develop solar-powered services.

Hanergy offers HanTile and HanWall services for green powered buildings. The first generation HanTile featured a double layer of glass and was released in two styles: Double-Glass Triple-Arch Series and Double-Glass Spool Series. Equipped with CIGS thin-film solar chips, the Double-Glass Triple-Arch Series has a 30 W capacity, while the Double-Glass Spool Series' capacity stands at 11.5 W. The new generation HanTile product, featuring a single rather than double layer of glass which makes it more thin, flexible and lightweight. The Building-integrated photovoltaics is represented by HanWall, which is released in two adaptations.

Hanergy provides mobile energy products Humbrella, HanPack, and HanPower. Humbrella is equipped with CIGS thin-film solar modules and a 9600 mAh battery. Humbrella Side features a side pole structure and an improved 25,200 mAh battery.

Thin-film solar-powered backpacks, HanPack, are integrated with 9 W, 6.14 W, or 7.17 W of CIGS thin-film solar power. HanPower Plus-In is a thin-film solar powered portable charger where a 12 W thin-film solar module and a traditional storage module are combined with a magnetic interface to offer constant wired/wireless charging.

=== Other operations ===
In addition to the solar energy technology, Hanergy owns installed hydrogeneration capacities over 6,000 MW. It also owns 131 MW of installed wind powercapacities.

== Corporate issues ==
=== Locations ===
Hanergy's corporate headquarters is located in Beijing Olympic Park. It has research and development centers in Beijing, Chengdu and Changzhou in China, in Silicon Valley and Tucson in the United States, in Berlin in Germany, and in Uppsala in Sweden. Its manufacturing plants are located in Heyuan, Wujin, Shuangyashan, Yucheng, Tangshan, Jiujiang, Haikou, Nanjing, Shuangliu Airport and Changxing in China, in Silicon Valley and Tucson in the United States, and in Thalheim in Germany.

=== Subsidiaries ===
Hanergy's subsidiary Solibro Hi-Tech produced glass-based CIGS solar cells thin-film modules. It had headquarters in Thalheim, Germany and a research site in Uppsala, Sweden.

Miasolé produces flexible CIGS solar cells and cell manufacturing equipment. MiaSolé flexible CIGS solar cell conversion efficiency has reached 19.4% at the laboratory and its commercial size flexible module set a new world record with 17.44% aperture area efficiency.

Global Solar Energy delivers lightweight, portable and flexible CIGS photovoltaic modules. These modules are suitable for building-integrated photovoltaics, consumer goods, electronics, and automotive applications. As of 2019, Hanergy's GSE flexible CIGS solar cell conversion efficiency stands at 19.3%.

Alta Devices, a gallium arsenide photovoltaic manufacturer based in California, United States, was acquired by Hanergy Group, a privately held Chinese multinational renewable energy company, in 2013. Its flexible GaAs technology was the world record holder for both single-junction and dual-junction solar cell conversion efficiency, standing at 29.1% and 31.6% respectively. The company was closed, along with several other solar manufacturers owned by Hanergy in 2019.

== See also ==
- Solar power in China
- Thin film solar cell
- List of CIGS companies
