= Yellow Pictures =

Malaysian film and TV production company

Yellow Pictures (椰楼映画) is a Malaysian film & TV production company led by founder-cum-director Wong Kew-Lit, co-founder-cum-senior producer Chan Shiau-Wei, and co-founder-cum-chief editor Wee Pei-Jun.

== Productions ==
- My Roots《扎根》(2007)
- Malaysian Movers《风云人物》(2007)
- My Malaysia《活在我乡》(2008)
- Dynamic Malaysia《前进吧•马来西亚》(2008)
- Living in Malaysia《身在马来西亚》(2008)
- Earnest Cultivation Yields Fruitful Harvests《生更致富》(2009)
- My New Village Stories《我来自新村》(2009)
- Malaysia My Home - Story of Sabah & Sarawak《家在马来西亚-沙巴与砂拉越华人故事》(2009)
- Parents' Stories《父母心》(2010)
- Stories of SJKC《我来自华小》(2010)
- My New Village Stories 2《我来自新村2》(2010)
- Made in Malaysia《老字号》(2011)
- Parents' Stories 2《父母心2》(2011)
- Stories of SJKC 2《我来自华小2》(2011)
- Malaysia My Home - Story of Sabah & Sarawak 2《家在马来西亚-沙巴与砂拉越华人故事2》(2011)
- The Traditional Trades《老行业》(2012)
- Behind The Dialect Groups《话说籍贯》(2012)
- Old Street Of Malaysia《老街故事》(2012)
- Strong Life《生命的战士》(2013)
- Malaysia My Home 5 - Story of West Malaysia《家在马来西亚5-西马城镇华人故事》(2013)
- A Century of Chinese Education《马来西亚百年华教》(2013)
- My New Village Stories 3《我来自新村3》(2013)
- Century Tales《百年》(2013)
- Stories of SJKC 3《我来自华小3》(2013)
- Our Land《大地》(2014)
- The Master《师傅》(2014)
- Between Us《我们》(2014)
- Good Morning Teacher《老师，您好》(2015)
- Our Land 2《大地2》(2015)
- Memoirs of World War II《三年零八个月》(2015)
- The Successor《接班人》(2015)
- The Moments《光辉岁月》(2016)
- A Love of Many Colors《白头偕老》(2016)
- Made in Malaysia 2《老字号2》(2016)
- Malaysia Railway Memories《铁道·人生》(2016)
- To Live《活着》(2016)
- Malaysia River Towns《母亲河》(2016)
- Whose Tradition《谁的传统》(2017)
- Work Abroad《别叫我马劳》(2017)
- Sixty《一甲子》(2017)

== Achievements ==
- Malaysia My Home - Story of Sabah & Sarawak - Best TV Documentary (Anugerah Seri Angkasa, 2010)
- My Roots - Best Documentary Director (Anugerah Oskar Malaysia Ke-6, 2007)

== See also ==
- Astro AEC
- Astro Wah Lai Toi
