= Zhu Dake =

- Born: 1957 (age 68–69); Shanghai, China
- Education: PhD
- Alma mater: East China Normal University; University of Technology, Sydney
- Occupations: Scholar, culture critic and essayist

Zhu Dake (Chinese: 朱大可; pinyin: Zhū Dàkě; born in 1957) is a Chinese scholar, cultural critic and essayist. He was born in Shanghai and his family was originally from Wuping, Fujian Province. He was educated in the department of Chinese language of East China Normal University and then was awarded a PhD in University of Technology, Sydney in Australia. He has also been a visiting scholar at the University of Sydney.

Rising to prominence in the mid-1980s, he was an important spokesman of the avant-garde culture. As a professor at Tongji University, working in its graduate school of cultural criticism, he is now engaged in the study and criticism of Chinese culture. He is considered adept in expressing his rational knowledge and determination toward the maintenance and development of the current culture with his advanced and sharp thoughts as well as his unique style of language. He was listed in "50 Top Chinese Influencing the World's Future" by the weekly magazine Phoenix Life.

== Life ==
Zhu Dake was born to an intellectual family in Shanghai. He lived in the Taiyuan Housing Estate which had been the centre of the French Concession till 1977, spending his lonely childhood and early youth reading books and playing the piano, an instrument he began at age seven. By the time he was sixteen years old, he had read and studied War and Peace, Dream of the Red Chamber, some works of Karl Marx and so on.

He worked as a locksmith for three years after leaving middle school and technical school. In 1979, though his dream was to study at the Shanghai Conservatory of Music, he was admitted to East China Normal University. He spent most of his time reading in the public library outside the school. Graduating in 1983, he was assigned to teach College Chinese at the Shanghai University of Finance and Economics. In 1985, he attracted interest for the first time in the field literary theory with The Worried Generation and Their City Dream (焦灼的一代和城市梦). In 1986, he wrote an article entitled "The Drawback of Xie Jin's Model" (谢晋电影模式的缺陷) which was published in Wen Wei Po (文汇报) and which created quite a stir at home and abroad because he criticized the ways of filmmaking at that time. In the early 1990s, besides writing, he also broadcast music programs, organized painting exhibitions and worked on behavior art.

Starting in 1994, Zhu spent 8 years in Australia,. During his stay in Australia, he established a Chinese website called Australia News (澳大利亚新闻网), which was renamed Pioneer of Culture (文化先锋). In 2002, upon his arrival, Zhu announced that he and literature had divorced, he thought that he could't get rid of the solitariness and desperation by literature. After that, Zhu turned into a scholar, a critic. He intervened in the field of cultural criticism, using a completely new style of writing. With the publication of a series of essays, including: Escapee's Dossiers, The Festival of Liumang, Review of the 21st Century Chinese Culture, Zhu caused a storm in the intellectuals. In September 2006, along with Li Ao, Yu Qiuyu, Wang Xiaohui (王小慧) and Cheng Bao (程抱一), Zhu, as a representative of Chinese culture, was elected in the list of Top 50 Chinese who will affect the future of world. (As selected by the magazine Phoenix Life).

== Works ==
=== The Burning Papañca ===
The Burning Papañca is Zhu Dake's first book. In 1991, when published, it attracted attention both among scholars and the public. Xie Mian (谢冕) claimed that it is a book full of wisdom, and it showed Zhu's talent as a critic. In this book, Zhu explained some professional problems involving contemporary poetry, cultural history, religion and myth, movie category. Articles included: An Anxious Generation and Urban Dreams, Inflamed papanca, Sublimation and Vulgarization of Literature, A Dialogue Between Scientism and Religionism, The Process of Cinema, etc. Zhu's unique and radical analysis of cultural phenomena and the suffering in contemporary life aroused broad controversy in the cultural circles. Moreover, owing to this book, the Chinese Writers Association in Australia awarded him a prize as Outstanding Chinese Writer. His statements were released abroad as a miniature of the ideologies of contemporary Chinese young people. As a representative of the young generation in the end of last century, Zhu thought extensively and deeply about the possibility of the existence of culture, inspiring the young readers’ thoughts on some fundamental issues concerning culture and education.

=== Escapee’s Dossiers ===
(逃亡者档案). The author is Zhu Dake, this book was published in 1999, (學林出版社), In the field of culture Criticism, Zhu Dake has his own style, that is always creating something new and original. In this book, there are 5 parts. He tried to expose the cultural maze by sharp language. He try his best to find real history by his wisdom, when he faced all kinds of cultural phenomena. He confidently came to the front, pointing the mistakes and correcting it. He claimed that there was something behind the truth. He declared:”I want to try”. This book makes us reflect and let us think about the problems of that ear.

=== The Festival of Liumang ===
Liumang (流氓) is a word meaning the rovers who have an anxious state of mind and who take a position of social rebellion. In this book, Zhu Dake divides Chinese society into the orthodox society and the Liumang's society where order, faith, authority and ethics don't exist. Examining three aspects, cool words (酷语), sexy words (色语) and abusive words (秽语), Zhu Dake researches, analyzes and elucidates thoroughly the existence of Liumang in all kinds of cultural forms, such as novels, poetry, art, music, etc. Zhu Dake reveals the features of Liumang in a vivid way because in this book, there are a great many of illustrations, including portraits, photos, posters, and paintings. Wei Yingjie (魏英杰), a famous Chinese writer and commentator, said that this book is a sort of history of modern Chinese culture. Before the publication of this book in November 2006, some passages had been published in many newspapers, for example, Dongfang Daily (zh:东方早报).

=== Review of the 21st Century Chinese Culture (multi-volume) ===
Review of the 21st Century Chinese Culture, issued under Zhu Dake and Zhang Hong’s (张闳, culture critic and essayist) general editorship and published by Guangxi Normal University Press from 2003 to 2008, is an annual presentation of the cultural achievement of Mainland China. There are 7 volumes up to now. It includes the essence of documents on cultural criticism of the year, popular key words and their explanations, lists of cultural events of the year and so on. To highlight the spirit of humanist culture, the book was edited from with a unique stand and the spirit of criticism as the coordinate system of "culture map": "cultural events" as its meridians to show the important events of different cultural domains, "key words" as its parallels to penetratingly explain the key words in the public cultural space, plus "critical literary selections" to note the annual high mental standard of culture criticism.

In terms of the graphic design, the book is always simple and plain, while every article in it is extremely exclusive and trenchant.

The majority of the theses of cultural criticism that the editors selected, are fruits of folk language. They demonstrate the general popular state of narration through text and maintained the original creation of the language and different critics’ unique styles.

The two editors took a more popular stand and more inclined to free individuals. They strove to break through the style of traditional yearbooks to present a more open state with more perspectives and tightly trace the flowing deformation and the future trend of Chinese culture. It is a significant "memorandum book" to learn local practices and customs.
