= Alta Devices =

Solar energy company

- Type: Private
- Industry: Solar Energy, photovoltaics
- Founded: 2007
- Defunct: 2019
- Headquarters: Sunnyvale, California
- Key people: Jian Ding, Senior Vice President of Hanergy Thin Film and CEO of Alta Devices; Founders: Eli Yablonovitch, Harry Atwater
- Products: Photovoltaic system, Solar Panels
- Number of employees: 250
- Website: altadevices.com (archived Oct. 8, 2019)

Alta Devices was a US-based specialty gallium arsenide (GaAs) PV manufacturer, which claimed to have achieved a solar cell conversion efficiency record of 29.1%, as certified by Germany's Fraunhofer ISE CalLab.

It was purchased by the Chinese company Hanergy in 2013 and was shut down without notice in 2019.

== History ==
Alta Devices was founded in 2007 by Eli Yablonovitch and Harry Atwater and manufactured solar photovoltaic applications for mobile devices that enable the conversion of light into electricity. The firm was acquired by Hanergy Group, a privately held Chinese multinational renewable energy company, in 2013.

The firm's technology was significant for unmanned aerial vehicles (UAVs), solar cars, and other electric vehicles.' NASA has been testing its solar technology for the International Space Station. The firm had been working with Audi on 'solar roofs' for their automobiles.

The firm broke efficiency records for single-junction solar cells and solar modules. In 2016, Alta Devices broke the world record conversion efficiency for dual-junction solar cell using InGaP/GaAs tandem structure. The world record was certified by National Renewable Energy Laboratory. This is the second time Alta Devices broke world record efficiency. The first time was 30.8% in 2013.

In 2019, the company ceased operations.

== Awards ==
- 2018 - Finalist in the 2019 Prism Awards for Photonics Innovation, determined by SPIE and Photonics Media.

== See also ==
- Solar cell efficiency
- Timeline of solar cells
