= Wong Kew-Lit =

Malaysian film director

Chinese name
- Traditional Chinese: 黃巧力
- Simplified Chinese: 黄巧力
- Hanyu Pinyin: Huáng Qiǎo Lì
- Wade–Giles: Huang2 Ch'iao3 Li4
- Pha̍k-fa-sṳ: Vòng Kháu-lit
- Jyutping: Wong4 Haau2 Lik6
- Hokkien POJ: N̂g Kháu-le̍k
- Tâi-lô: N̂g Kháu-li̍k

Wong Kew-Lit (黄巧力) is a Malaysian film director and producer.

== Biography ==
Wong Kew-Lit, born June 1971, is a prolific Malaysian born director/producer. From his decade long TV programmes making experience since the 1990s, he has ventured into various genres ranging from documentary, drama to short film.

In 2002, his documentary programme on the life of Sumatran Rhinoceros was nominated best documentary of the 9th Shanghai International Film Festival.

From 2002 to 2005, he was involved in a 251-episode Cantonese drama "Homecoming" as the chief writer cum director. He is also the theme song composer and lyricist.

In 2005, he was selected as one of five directors from various Asian countries to produce and direct a documentary for internationally acclaimed TV station Phoenix Satellite TV of China (Phoenix Television), in commemoration of its 10th anniversary. In 2006, he was involved in 2 drama series "Rhythm of Vibration" and "Sea Providence" both joint-venture projects by CCTV China-Malaysia as executive producer.

In October 2006, he established Yellow Pictures Sdn Bhd and produced a series of highly acclaimed programme including "My Roots" documentary series (awarded Best Documentary Director in the 6th Malaysian Oskar Award), "My Malaysia" documentary series, "Dynamic Malaysia" Public Information Short Film series, "Living in Malaysia" documentary series, "My New Village Stories" and "Malaysia My Home - Story of Sabah & Sarawak" (awarded Best TV Documentary in Anugerah Seri Angkasa 2010).

He just completed a film entitled 'The New Village', telling the stories about resettlement of villages in between 1948-1960 during the Malayan Emergency, when the Colonial British fought against the local Communist Guerrilla.

== Filmography ==
Year	Title	Chinese Title
1999	Momentum	
2000/01	Momentum II	
2001	Jejak Warisan	《文明的足迹》
2002/04	Homecoming I & II	《己子当归》
2004	3 in a Company	《听君一席话》
2005	Malaysia My Home	《家在马来西亚I》
2006	Malaysia My Home 2	《家在马来西亚II》
2006/07	Rhythm of Vibration	《双城变奏》
2006/07	Sea Providence	《热浪岛》
2007	My Roots	《扎根》
2007	Malaysian Movers	《风云人物》
2008	My Malaysia	《活在我乡》
2008	Dynamic Malaysia	《前进吧·马来西亚》
2008	Living in Malaysia	《身在马来西亚》
2009	Earnest Cultivation Yields Fruitful Harvests	《生耕致富》
2009	My New Village Stories	《我来自新村》
2009	Malaysia My Home - Story of Sabah & Sarawak	《家在马来西亚-沙巴与砂拉越华人故事》
2010	Parents' Stories	《父母心》
2010	Stories of SJKC	《我来自华小》
2010	My New Village Stories 2	《我来自新村2》
2011	Made in Malaysia	《老字号》
2011	Parents' Stories 2	《父母心2》
2011	Stories of SJKC 2	《我来自华小2》
2011	Malaysia My Home - Story of Sabah & Sarawak 2	《家在马来西亚-沙巴与砂拉越华人故事2》
2012	Eu Yan Sang Chinese New Year TVC 2012	《团年快乐 勿忘传统 》余仁生2012新春公益广告
2012	The Traditional Trades	《老行业》
2012	Behind The Dialect Groups	《话说籍贯》
2012	Old Street Of Malaysia	《老街故事》
2013	Eu Yan Sang Chinese New Year TVC 2013	《珍惜 》余仁生2013新春公益广告
2013	Strong Life	《生命的战士》
2013	Malaysia My Home 5 - Story of West Malaysia	《家在马来西亚5-西马城镇华人故事》
2013	A Century of Chinese Education	《马来西亚百年华教》
2013	My New Village Stories 3	《我来自新村3》
2013	Century Tales	《百年》
2013	Stories of SJKC 3	《我来自华小3》
2014	Eu Yan Sang Chinese New Year TVC 2014	《爱 需要用心沟通 》余仁生2014新春公益广告
2014	Our Land	《大地》
2014	The Master	《师傅》
2014	Between Us	《我们》
2015	Eu Yan Sang Chinese New Year TVC 2015	《别让年菜和方言，遗失在时空里 》余仁生2015新春公益广告
2015	Good Morning Teacher	《老师，您好》
2015	Our Land 2	《大地2》
2015	Memoirs of World War II	《三年零八个月》
2015	The Successor	《接班人》
2016	The Moments	《光辉岁月》
2016	A Love of Many Colors	《白头偕老》
2016	Made in Malaysia 2	《老字号2》
2016	Malaysia Railway Memories	《铁道•人生》
2016	To Live	《活着》
2016	Malaysia River Towns	《母亲河》
2017	Whose Tradition	《谁的传统》
2017	Work Abroad	《别叫我马劳》
2017	Sixty	《一甲子》

== Achievements ==
- 2011 Malaysia My Home - Story of Sabah & Sarawak - Best TV Documentary (Anugerah Seri Angkasa 2010)
- 2007 My Roots - Best Documentary Director (Anugerah Oskar Malaysia Ke-6)
