= Miasolé =

American corporation

- Type: Subsidiary
- Industry: Solar Energy
- Founded: 2001
- Headquarters: Santa Clara, California, U.S.
- Key people: Jie Zhang (CEO); Lyndsey Zhang (CFO); Atiye Bayman (CTO)
- Products: Solar panels & Solar Cell Production Systems
- Number of employees: 315
- Parent: Hanergy
- Website: miasole.com

MiaSolé is an American solar energy company selling copper indium gallium selenide (CIGS) thin-film photovoltaic products, with a manufacturing process that lays CIGS on a flexible stainless steel substrate. MiaSolé produces all layers of photovoltaic material in a continuous sputtering process.

Based in Santa Clara, California, the company is focused on large-scale commercial and utility projects, and was acquired by privately held Chinese clean energy company Hanergy in 2013.

== Company history ==
In 2006, Miasolé said it would enter commercial production that year, although this was postponed. In 2007, new management was brought in and the commercial production forecast was changed to 2009. Throughout 2008 and much of 2009, MiaSolé worked on re-engineering the manufacturing process to improve efficiency and cost. By the second half of 2008, two 20 megawatt production lines were installed and MiaSolé had achieved 10.2% efficient modules as measured by NREL. In 2010, the company planned to expand capacity to 140 megawatts from about 60 megawatts. The company produced approximately 20 megawatts in 2010 and approximately 40 megawatts in 2011.

As of Q2 2012, MiaSole has a manufacturing factory in California with a 150 megawatt capacity.

== Investment history ==
MiaSolé's initial raise was in 2004 and led by VantagePoint Venture Partners. The B round raised $16 million in venture capital investment in June 2005, in a round led by Kleiner Perkins Caufield & Byers, and raised a further $35 million in October 2006. The company raised $50 million in a fourth round of financing in September 2007, bringing total financing to $100 million. MiaSolé currently has roughly $500 million in investment from investors including VantagePoint Venture Partners, Kleiner Perkins, and Firelake Capital Management. In addition, the company received about $100 million federal tax credit from the United States Department of Energy. On January 9, 2013, Hanergy issued a press release stating that it had acquired MiaSolé for $30 million.

== Technology ==
MiaSolé's development of a new production process leverages its executives’ experience in the hard disk and semiconductor industries. In this unique process, MiaSolé deposits copper indium gallium selenide (CIGS), on a flexible stainless steel substrate entirely through a continuous sputtering process. Sputtering is used in volume thin-film production, and is used by high volume manufacturing companies in the disk drive and architectural glass industries. Sputtering deposits a thin film of material onto a surface in a vacuum. MiaSolé claims it uses a continuous sputter deposition process in one tool to deposit all layers of the CIGS solar cell on a lightweight stainless steel substrate.

CIGS is among the most efficient solar cell materials with a maximum solar conversion efficiency of 20.3% in the laboratory – better than the best lab cells using amorphous silicon or cadmium telluride, but manufacturing it in volume has been a problem. Despite these difficulties, CIGS is expected to surpass cadmium telluride, used by companies like First Solar, in efficiency. Thin-film technology is inherently less expensive than market leading crystalline silicon because of the cost of the silicon substrate.

MiaSolé’s first production module, the MR series, was verified by the US National Renewable Energy Laboratory at >10% efficiency. MiaSolé’s 100 and 107 watt CIGS thin film solar modules were certified to UL 1703 and IEC 61646 and 61730 standards on October 30, 2009 – the first CIGS thin film module to be simultaneously certified by UL to the three most critical certification standards.

As of Oct. 2019, MiaSolé had established the record for flexible PV modules at commercial size of 18.6% and flexible mini-cell with 20.5% efficiency.

== Production ==
The company began commercial shipments in November 2009 including a shipment to the Chevron Brightfield installation in Central California. In April 2011, MiaSole entered into an agreement with Intel's Technical Manufacturing Services practice. Under the agreement, Intel was to use its "Copy Exactly!" methodology to help ramp MiaSole to over 150MW of production capacity. As of October 2011, the company had shipped over 55MW of modules to installations over the globe. In November 2011, the company produced its 50 millionth cell.

== See also ==
- List of CIGS companies
