= Philip Lee Tau Sang =

Malaysian politician

Philip Lee Tau Sang (Chinese: 李道生) (died 1959) was a politician of Hakka Chinese descent in North Borneo (now the east Malaysian state of Sabah). At various different times, he was a member of the first Advisory Council of North Borneo after the war(1947–1950), the first Legislative Council of North Borneo (1950–1958) and the Executive Council of North Borneo (1950–1953, 1956–1957), and had represented the Colony with distinction at numerous overseas conferences.

Lee represented the Chinese community during the formation of the Crown Colony of North Borneo in 1946.

He was highly respected by the Chinese community in North Borneo and well-liked by the British colonialists. The latter touted him as a future Prime Minister of North Borneo after its independence from the United Kingdom. However, four years before North Borneo joined the federation of Malaysia, Lee suddenly died of a heart attack in the United States.

Lee Tau Sang Road (Malay: Jalan Lee Tau Sang) is named in Lee's honour. It is located in Tanjung Aru, a southern suburb of Kota Kinabalu, the state capital of Sabah.
