= Jinanqiao Dam =

Dam in Lijiang City in Yunnan Province

- Location within China
- Country: China
- Location: Lijiang City in Yunnan Province
- Coordinates: 26°48′32″N 100°26′45″E
- Status: In use
- Construction began: 2003
- Opening date: 2010

Dam and spillways
- Type of dam: Gravity
- Impounds: Jinsha River
- Height: 160 m (525 ft)
- Length: 640 m (2,100 ft)
- Dam volume: 3,920,000 m^{3} (138,433,494 ft^{3})
- Spillways: 5
- Spillway type: Service, crest openings
- Spillway capacity: 14,980 m^{3}/s (529,014 cu ft/s)

Reservoir
- Creates: Jinanqiao Reservoir
- Total capacity: 847,000,000 m^{3} (686,674 acre⋅ft)
- Catchment area: 237,400 km^{2} (91,661 sq mi)

Power Station
- Commission date: 2010-2011
- Hydraulic head: 111 m (364 ft) (max.)
- Turbines: 4 x 600 MW Francis turbines
- Installed capacity: 2,400 MW

The Jinanqiao Dam or Jin'anqiao Dam (Chinese: 金安桥水电站, meaning "golden and peace bridge") is a concrete gravity dam on the Jinsha River 25 km (16 mi) southeast of Lijiang City in Yunnan Province, China. The purpose of the dam is hydroelectric power production and flood control.

== Construction ==
The Jinanqiao project was approved in August 2003 and construction began in 2005. By December of that year, the river was diverted and the construction of the actual dam began in January 2006. By February 2007, the foundation had been excavated and concrete pouring began. In June 2010, the dam's first generator was operational, the last was commissioned in 2011.

== Design ==
The dam is a 160 m (525 ft) tall and 640 m (2,100 ft) long gravity dam composed of 3,920,000 m^{3} (138,433,494 ft^{3}) of roller-compacted concrete. The dam's crest elevation is 1,424 m^{3} (50,288 ft^{3}) above sea level and it withholds a 847,000,000 m^{3} (686,674 acre⋅ft) reservoir with a normal storage level of 1,418 m (4,652 ft) ASL. Of the reservoir's storage, 313,000,000 m^{3} (253,753 acre⋅ft) is active or "useful". The dam's spillway consists of five 13 m (43 ft) x 20 m (66 ft) openings which have a maximum flood discharge capacity of 14,980 m^{3}/s (529,014 cu ft/s). To prevent scouring, the dam has a stilling basin at the foot of the spillway. The dam's power station sits at its toe and adjacent to the spillway. It is 213 m (699 ft) long, 34 m (112 ft) wide and 79.2 m (260 ft) high. Four penstocks with a 10.5 m (34 ft) diameter feed the 4 x 600 MW Francis turbine-generators which can discharge up to 605 m^{3}/s (21,365 cu ft/s) after generation. Each Francis runner has a 6 m (20 ft) diameter.

Because of high seismic activity in the area of the dam, special care was taken during design and construction to prepare the joints and foundation for sliding and tensile stress. Earthquake-resistant steel bars were installed in high-tensile areas, the construction joint was reduced to 2/3 its size and filled with non-woven fabrics along with the incorporation of a grouted joint between the dam and power plant.

== See also ==
- List of power stations in China
