= List of Hong Kong people by net worth =

The following is a Forbes list of Hong Kong billionaires is based on an annual assessment of wealth and assets compiled and published by Forbes magazine on April 3, 2024.

== 2024 Hongkongers billionaires list ==
| No. | Name | Net worth | Source(s) of wealth |
|---|---|---|---|
| 1 | Li Ka-Shing | $37.3 billion | CK Hutchison Holdings |
| 2 | Lee Shau Kee | $27.7 billion | Henderson Land Development |
| 3 | Robin Zeng | $22.9 billion | CATL |
| 4 | Peter Woo | $15.1 billion | Wheelock & Co, The Wharf (Holdings) |
| 5 | Joseph Lau | $13.1 billion | Chinese Estates Holdings |
| 6 | Kwong Siu-hing | $12 billion | Sun Hung Kai Properties |
| 7 | Lui Che-woo | $11.2 billion | Galaxy Entertainment, K. Wah International |
| 8 | Gong Hongjia & family | $10.2 billion | Hikvision |
| 9 | Xu Hang | $9.5 billion | Mindray |
| 10 | Francis Choi | $8.2 billion | Early Light International (Holdings) Ltd. |
| 11 | Law Kar Po | $7.7 billion | Park Hotel Group |
| 12 | Wang Laisheng | $6.8 billion | Luxshare |
| 13 | Wang Laichun | $6.6 billion | Luxshare |
| 14 | Sir Michael Kadoorie | $6.3 billion | CLP Holdings, Hongkong and Shanghai Hotels |
| 15 | Zhou Qunfei & family | $6.1 billion | Lens Technology |
| 16 | Ruan Liping | $5.8 billion | Gongniu |
| 17 | Ruan Xueping | $5.8 billion | Gongniu |
| 18 | Wu Jianshu | $5.2 billion | Ningbo Tuopo Group |
| 19 | Li Ping | $4.5 billion | CATL |
| 20 | Richard Li | $4.5 billion | Pacific Century Group |
| 21 | Pansy Ho | $3.8 billion | MGM China |
| 22 | Cho Tak Wong | $3.6 billion | Fuyao |
| 23 | Samuel Lee Tak | $3.6 billion | Langham Estate |
| 24 | Edwin Leong | $3.6 billion | Tai Hung Fai Enterprise |
| 25 | Neil Shen | $3.5 billion | Sequoia Capital China |
| 26 | Zeng Fangqin | $3.5 billion | Lingyi iTech |
| 27 | Tung Chee-chen | $3.4 billion | OOCL |
| 28 | Rita Tong Liu | $3.3 billion | Gale Well Group |
| 29 | Solina Chau | $3.1 billion | Horizons Ventures |
| 30 | Ronald McAulay | $3.1 billion | CLP Holdings |
| 31 | Patrick Lee | $2.9 billion | Lee & Man Paper |
| 32 | Chan Tan Ching-fen | $2.6 billion | Hang Lung Group |
| 33 | Tung Chee-hwa | $2.6 billion | OOCL |
| 34 | Or Wai Sheun | $2.5 billion | Kowloon Development Company |
| 35 | David Fong | $2.4 billion | Hip Shing Hong Group |
| 36 | Geoffrey Kwok | $2.4 billion | Sun Hung Kai Properties |
| 37 | Jonathan Kwok | $2.4 billion | Sun Hung Kai Properties |
| 38 | Angela Leong | $2.4 billion | SJM Holdings |
| 39 | Ye Chenghai & family | $2.4 billion | Salubris Pharmaceuticals |
| 40 | Yeung Kin-man | $2.3 billion | Biel Crystal |
| 41 | Adam Kwok | $2.2 billion | Sun Hung Kai Properties |
| 42 | Lam Wai Ying | $2.2 billion | Biel Crystal |
| 43 | Li Jianquan & family | $2.2 billion | Winner Medical |
| 44 | Tang Yiu | $2.2 billion | Belle International |
| 45 | Michael Ying | $2.2 billion | Esprit Holdings Limited |
| 46 | Hui Wing Mau | $2.1 billion | Shimao Property |
| 47 | Huang Yi | $2 billion | Zhongsheng Group |
| 48 | Wong Man Li | $2 billion | Man Wah Holdings |
| 49 | Chow Shing Yuk | $1.9 billion | Lalamove |
| 50 | Chu Lam Yiu | $1.9 billion | Huabao International Holdings |
| 51 | Thomas Kwok | $1.8 billion | Sun Hung Kai Properties |
| 52 | Martin Lau | $1.8 billion | Tencent |
| 53 | Huang Dawen | $1.7 billion | Hoshine Silicon Industry |
| 54 | Daniel Chiu | $1.6 billion | Fortune Oil |
| 55 | Christopher Kwok | $1.4 billion | Sun Hung Kai Properties |
| 56 | Edward Kwok | $1.4 billion | Sun Hung Kai Properties |
| 57 | Li Sze Lim | $1.4 billion | R&F Properties |
| 58 | Vincent Lo | $1.4 billion | Shui On Land |
| 59 | Gordon Wu | $1.4 billion | Hopewell Holdings |
| 60 | Yu Peidi | $1.3 billion | Greattown Holdings |
| 61 | Raymond Kwok | $1.2 billion | Sun Hung Kai Properties |
| 61 | Huang Shih Tsai | $1.2 billion | Great China International |
| 62 | William Fung | $1.1 billion | Li & Fung |
| 63 | Huang Jiangji | $1.1 billion | Xiaomi |
| 64 | Weijian Shan | $1.1 billion | PAG |
| 65 | Allan Wong | $1.1 billion | VTech |
| 66 | Wu Kaiting | $1.1 billion | Xiamen Intretech |
| 67 | She Yingjie | $1 billion | Olympic Circuit Technology |

== See also ==
- Lists of billionaires
- List of countries by the number of billionaires
- List of Hong Kong people
- List of wealthiest families
