= Ye (surname) =

- Pronunciation: Yè, Yeh (Mandarin) Yip, Ip (Cantonese) Yap (Hakka, Hokkien)
- Language: Chinese, Vietnamese

Origin
- Language: Old Chinese
- Origin: City of Ye, State of Chu
- Meaning: Leaf

Ye (traditional Chinese: 葉; simplified Chinese: 叶; pinyin: Yè) is a Chinese-language surname. It is listed 257th in the Song dynasty classic text Hundred Family Surnames, and is the 43rd most common surname in China, with a population of 5.8 million as of 2008 and 2019.

== Transliterations and Derivatives ==
- Ye in Mandarin, alternatively romanized as Yeh in Taiwan
- Yip, Ip, Jip, or Yeap in Cantonese
- Iap or Yap in Hokkien and Teochew
- Yap or Yapp in Hakka
- Iek in Eastern Min
- Iet in Gan
- Ip in Macau
- Eap in Cambodia
- Ijap, Jap, Jip, Yap, or Yip in Indonesia
- Yap, Yip, Yak, Yaap, or Yeap in Malaysia
- Yap in Philippines and Singapore

=== Derivations ===
- As the Hanja of the Korean surnames romanized as Yeop (Korean: 엽) and Seop (Korean: 섭)
- As the Chữ Nôm for the Vietnamese surname Diệp
- Derived as Effendi, Japri, Yapardi, Yapina, Yappy, Yaputra, Yipman, or other Indonesianized surnames among Chinese Indonesians

== Pronunciation ==
In Middle Chinese, Ye (葉) was pronounced Sjep (IPA: [ɕiɛp]). As late as the 11th-century Guangyun Dictionary, it was a homophone of other characters that are pronounced shè in modern Mandarin and sip in modern Cantonese.

== Origin ==
Ye means "leaf" in modern Chinese, but the name arose as a lineage name referring to the city of Ye (in modern Ye County, Henan) in the State of Chu during the Spring and Autumn period of ancient China.

According to Sima Qian's Records of the Grand Historian, Yuxiong, a descendant of the Yellow Emperor and his grandson Zhuanxu, was the teacher of King Wen of Zhou. After the Zhou overthrew the Shang dynasty, King Cheng of Zhou (reigned 1042-1021 BC) awarded Yuxiong's great-grandson Xiong Yi the fiefdom of Chu, which over the ensuing centuries developed into a major kingdom. King Zhuang of Chu (reigned 613-591 BC) was one of the Five Hegemons, the most powerful monarchs during the Spring and Autumn period.

In 506 BC the State of Wu invaded Chu with an army commanded by King Helü, Wu Zixu and Sun Tzu. Shen Yin Shu, a great-grandson of King Zhuang and the Chu field marshal, was killed in the aftermath of the Battle of Boju.

After the war King Zhao of Chu enfeoffed Shen Yin Shu's son Shen Zhuliang with the key frontier city of Ye, in gratitude for his father's sacrifice. Shen Zhuliang subsequently put down the rebellion of Sheng, Duke of Bai, in 478 BC and restored King Hui as ruler of Chu. King Hui then granted him the titles of prime minister, marshal, and Duke of Ye (葉公).

In Zhou dynasty China, noble families usually had two surnames: clan name (氏) and lineage name (姓). Shen Zhuliang, from a cadet branch of the ruling house of Chu, shared the lineage name of Mi (芈) of the Chu kings. He also inherited the clan name of Shen from his father, but his fame led some of his descendants to adopt Ye as their clan name. Later the distinction between the clan and lineage names was abolished, and Ye became the surname of Shen Zhuliang's descendants. Shen Zhuliang, now better known as Duke of Ye, is considered the founding ancestor of the Ye surname.

== Notable people ==
- Yifei Ye, famous driver from China
- Duke of Ye (c. 500 BC), Prime Minister of the State of Chu during the Spring and Autumn period
- Ye Fashan (631–720), Tang dynasty Taoist, revered as an immortal
- Ye Guanglüe (died 911), late Tang dynasty warlord in Guangxi
- Ye Zuqia (叶祖洽; 1046–1117), Song dynasty zhuangyuan and Vice Minister of Personnel
- Ye Mengde (1077–1148), Song dynasty scholar and Minister of Revenue
- Ye Yong (葉顒; 1100–1167), Southern Song dynasty prime minister
- Ye Heng (叶衡; 1114–1175), Southern Song dynasty prime minister
- Ye Shi (叶适; 1150–1223), Southern Song neo-Confucian scholar
- Ye Sen (葉森; 1190–1208), Southern Song Taoist, revered as god in Fujian
- Ye Shaoweng (fl. 1200–1250), Southern Song poet
- Ye Mengding (叶梦鼎; 1200–1279), Southern Song prime minister
- Ye Chen (葉琛; 1314–1362), Yuan dynasty governor, Marquess of Nanyang
- Ye Fu (葉福; died 1402), Ming dynasty official and military leader
- Ye Xixian (葉希賢; died 1402), Ming dynasty official
- Ye Di (葉砥; 1342–1421), Ming dynasty scholar-official
- Ye Chun (葉春; 1370–1433), Ming dynasty Vice-Minister of Justice
- Ye Sheng (葉盛; 1420–1470), Ming dynasty scholar-official
- Ye Qi (葉淇; 1426–1501), Ming dynasty Minister of Revenue
- Ye Mengxiong (葉夢熊; 1531–1597), Ming dynasty Minister of War
- Ye Chunji (1532–1595), Ming dynasty scholar-official
- Ye Xianggao (1559–1627), Ming dynasty prime minister and
- Ye Xianzu (叶宪祖; 1566–1641), Ming dynasty playwright
- Ye Yongsheng (葉永盛; 16th century), Ming dynasty official, county god of Nanhui
- Ye Fang'ai (葉方藹; 1629-1682), Qing dynasty official
- Ye Tianshi (葉天士; 1667–1747), doctor and Chinese medicine theorist
- Ye Shaokui (葉紹楏; died 1821), Qing dynasty Governor of Guangxi province
- Ye Weigeng (葉維庚; 1773–1828), Qing dynasty official and historian
- Ye Mingchen (1807–1859), Qing dynasty Governor of Guangdong province
- Ye Yunlai (died 1861), Taiping Rebellion general
- Ye Yanlan (叶衍兰; 1823–1898), Qing dynasty official and writer
- Yap Ah Loy (1837–1885), founder of Kuala Lumpur
- Ye Zhichao (葉志超; 1838–1901), Qing dynasty general
- Ye Chengzhong (1840–1899), tycoon and philanthropist
- Yap Ah Shak (葉亞石; died 1889), Kapitan Cina of Kuala Lumpur
- Yap Goan Ho (葉源和, died 1894), Chinese Indonesian translator
- Ye Zhichao (died 1901), Huai Army general
- Yip Sang (葉春田; 1845–1927) Chinese-Canadian businessman
- Yap Kwan Seng (1846–1902), the last Kapitan Cina of Kuala Lumpur
- Ye Changchi (葉昌熾; 1849–1917), Qing dynasty scholar
- Ye Huijun (葉惠鈞; 1863–1932), Republic of China revolutionary and politician
- Ye Dehui (葉德輝; 1864–1927), scholar-official, executed by the Communists
- Ye Lanfang (叶兰舫; 1864–1937), founder of Commercial Guarantee Bank of China
- Yeap Chor Ee (葉祖意; 1867-1952), Malaysian businessman and philanthropist
- Ye Xinghai (叶星海; 1870–1929), Tianjin comprador
- Ye Zhuotang (叶琢堂; 1875–1940), banker, general manager of Farmers Bank of China
- Ye Keliang (葉可樑; 1879–1972), Republic of China educator and diplomat
- Ye Zhongyu (叶仲裕; 1881–1909), cofounder of Fudan University
- Ye Ju (1881–1925), Republic of China general and governor of Guangdong province
- Ye Gongchuo (叶恭绰; 1881–1968), Republic of China Finance Minister, Railway Minister, and collector, grandson of Ye Yanlan
- Ye Xiasheng (葉夏聲; 1882–1956), Republic of China politician and lieutenant general
- Ye Zaijun (葉在均; 1885–1951), Republic of China Supreme Court justice
- Yap Hong Tjoen (1885–1952), founder of Dr. Yap Eye Hospital in Yogyakarta, Indonesia
- Ye Chucang (叶楚伧; 1887–1946), scholar and Kuomintang politician, Governor of Jiangsu
- Ye Zhao (葉肇; 1892-1953), ROC general
- Ye Jizhuang (1893–1967), PRC Minister of Foreign Trade
- Ip Man/Yip Man (1893–1972), martial arts master, teacher of Bruce Lee
- Ye Shengtao (1893–1988), writer and educator
- Ye Shaoyi (叶少毅; 1895–1919), one of the first Chinese pilots
- Ye Ting (1896–1946), Communist general of the New Fourth Army
- Ye Juquan (叶橘泉; 1896–1989), Chinese medicine scientist, member of the Chinese Academy of Sciences
- Ye Jianying (1897–1986), People's Liberation Army marshal, chairman of the National People's Congress
- Ye Qisun (1898–1977), physicist and educator
- Godfrey Yeh (葉庚年; 1900–1988), entrepreneur
- Ye Xiufeng (1900–1990), Republic of China politician
- Ye Yongfang (叶庸方; 1903–1944), businessman and publisher, son of Ye Xinghai
- George Yeh (1904–1981), Republic of China diplomat and Foreign Minister, nephew of Ye Gongchuo
- Yip Hon (1904–1997), Macau gambling tycoon
- Ye Lingfeng (葉靈鳳; 1905–1975), writer and artist
- Ye Tinggui (葉廷珪; 1905–1977), Mayor of Tainan
- K. Dock Yip (葉求鐸; 1906-2001), community leader in Toronto's First Chinatown, the first Canadian lawyer of Chinese descent
- Ye Qianyu (1907–1995), pioneering manhua artist, cofounder of Shanghai Manhua
- Teddy Yip (1907–2003), Indonesian-Chinese businessman, Formula One team owner
- Yap Tjwan Bing (叶全明; 1910-1988), Indonesian politician
- Ye Duyi (叶笃义; 1912–2004), Vice-chairman of the China Democratic League
- Ye Shengzhang (葉盛章; 1912–1966), Peking opera singer
- Yap Thiam Hien (1913–1989), Indonesian human rights lawyer, namesake of the Yap Thiam Hien Award
- Yeh Ming-hsun (1913–2009), journalist, cofounder of Shih Hsin University
- Ye Fei (1914–1999), Filipino-Chinese general, commander of the Chinese Navy
- Ye Junjian (叶君健; 1914–1999), novelist in Chinese and Esperanto, translator
- Ye Duzhuang (叶笃庄; 1914–2000), agronomist, brother of Ye Duyi
- Yeap Cheng Eng (葉清榮; 1915–1994), Chinese footballer
- Ye Peida (1915–2011), cofounder and president of Beijing University of Posts and Telecommunications
- Ye Duzheng (1916–2013), meteorologist and member of the Chinese Academy of Sciences, brother of Ye Duyi
- Ye Qun (1917–1971), wife of Vice-chairman Lin Biao
- Ye Zhishan (叶至善; 1918–2006), writer and publisher, son of Ye Shengtao
- Ye Zhupei or Yap Chu-Phay (1920–1971), Filipino-born metallurgist, founder of chemical metallurgy in China, member of the Chinese Academy of Sciences
- Ye Shuifu (叶水夫; 1920–2002), translator, President of Translators Association of China
- Ye Hongjia (葉宏甲; 1923–1990), Taiwanese cartoonist
- Chia-ying Yeh (1924–2024), Chinese-Canadian poet and scholar
- Ye Lizhong (叶利中; 1924–1999), xiangsheng performer, brother of Ye Duyi
- Ye Zhemin (1924–2018), art historian
- Ye Xuanping (1924–2019), Governor of Guangdong, son of Ye Jianying
- Ip Chun (born 1924), martial artist, son of Yip Man
- Yeh Shih-tao (1925–2008), Taiwanese writer and historian
- Ye Minghan (1925–2024), Chinese physicist
- Ye Qingbing (葉慶炳; 1927–1993), Taiwanese writer and scholar
- Ye Qingyao (1927–2019), Taiwanese-born Chinese engineer and politician
- Ye Shuhua (born 1927), astronomer, member of the Chinese Academy of Sciences
- Ye Zhengda (1927–2017), aircraft designer and PLA lieutenant general, son of Ye Ting
- Ye Weiqu (1929–2010), Chinese-Vietnamese writer and translator
- Geoffrey Yeh (1931–2016), businessman, son of Godfrey Yeh
- Yeh Changti (1933–2016), Republic of China Air Force pilot, member of the Black Cat Squadron
- Ye Liansong (born 1935), Communist Party Chief and Governor of Hebei Province
- Ye Xiushan (1935–2016), philosopher
- Sidney Yip (born 1936), American physicist
- Ye Peiqiong (born 1937), table tennis player
- Ye Xuanning (1938–2016), major general, son of Ye Jianying
- Ye Rutang (叶如棠; born 1940), architect, Vice-Minister of Construction
- Ye Yonglie (1940–2020), science fiction and biography writer
- Yeap Ghim Guan (1941-2007), Malaysian politician
- Thomas Yeh Sheng-nan (born 1941), Taiwanese prelate of the Roman Catholic Church, diplomat of the Holy See
- Ye Caiyu or Ye Ling (葉彩育; 1942–2012), Taiwanese singer
- Ye Wenling (born 1942), novelist and politician
- Arthur Yap (1943–2006), Singaporean poet, writer, and painter
- Yap Pian Hon (叶炳汉; born 1943), Malaysian politician
- Ye Chenghai (born 1943), politician and billionaire entrepreneur, founder of Salubris Pharmaceuticals
- Yeh Chin-fong (born 1943), former Republic of China Minister of Justice
- Johnny Ip (葉振棠; born 1944), Hong Kong singer and actor
- Ye Lipei (叶立培; born 1944), real estate developer
- Ye Peijian (born 1945), commander of the Chinese Lunar Exploration Program
- Deanie Ip (born 1947), Hong Kong singer and actress
- Frances Yip (born 1947), Hong Kong singer
- Wing-Huen Ip (born 1947), Chinese-German astronomer
- Laurence Yep (born 1948), Chinese-American writer, author of the Dragon series
- Yeh Hsien-hsiu (born 1948), Taiwanese singer and politician
- Yeh Chu-lan (born 1949), former Vice Premier of Taiwan
- Ye Xiaowen (born 1950), scholar and politician
- Yeh Ching-chuan, Minister of Health, Republic of China
- Bing Yeh (born 1950), Taiwanese-American entrepreneur, founder of Silicon Storage Technology
- Regina Ip (born 1950), Hong Kong politician
- Ip Kwok-him (1951–2020), Hong Kong politician
- Ip Yut Kin (born 1951), CEO of Apple Daily
- Mary Yap Kain Ching (叶娟呈; born 1951), Malaysian politician
- Stephen Ip (born 1955), Hong Kong politician
- Ye Shuangyu (叶双瑜; born 1955), Vice-Governor of Fujian province
- Ye Xiaogang (born 1955), composer
- Ye Zhizhen (叶志镇; born 1955), Chinese artist and professor
- Ye Tan (born 1956), economist
- Yeh Kuang-shih (born 1957), Republic of China Minister of Transportation and Communications
- Yeh Jiunn-rong (born 1958), Minister of Education of the Republic of China
- John Yap (born 1959), Singaporean-born Canadian politician
- V-Nee Yeh (born 1959), Hong Kong businessman, son of Geoffrey Yeh
- Irene Yeh (born 1959), Taiwanese singer
- Yip Wing-sie (born 1960), Hong Kong musician
- Nai-Chang Yeh (born 1961), Taiwanese-American physicist
- Sally Yeh (born 1961), Taiwanese-Canadian singer and actress
- Yip Kai Foon (born 1961), Hong Kong gangster
- Ip Kin-yuen (born 1962), Hong Kong politician
- Yeh Lee-hwa (葉李華; born 1962), Taiwanese science fiction writer
- Yap Yew Weng (葉耀榮; born 1963), Malaysian politician
- Ye Rongguang (born 1963), first Chinese chess Grandmaster
- Cecilia Yip (葉童; born 1963), Hong Kong actress
- Yip Sai Wing (born 1963), drummer of Hong Kong rock band Beyond
- Wilson Yip (born 1963), Hong Kong actor and filmmaker
- Zhenli Ye Gon (born 1963), Chinese-Mexican businessman, alleged drug trafficker
- Ye Qiaobo (born 1964), world champion speed skater
- Amy Yip (born 1965), Hong Kong actress
- Yeh Shin-cheng (born 1965), Vice-Minister of the Environmental Protection Administration (Republic of China)
- Yip Tin-shing (born 1965), Hong Kong screenwriter
- Veronica Yip (born 1966), Hong Kong actress
- Francis Ching-wah Yip (葉菁華; born 1967), Hong Kong director and assistant professor
- Timmy Yip (born 1967), Hong Kong film art director, Academy Award winner
- Vern Yip (born 1968), Hong Kong-born American interior designer
- Yoke Khin Yap (葉玉牽; born 1968), American scientist and academic
- Ye Chong (born 1969), fencer, Olympic medalist
- Ye Kuangzheng (叶匡政; born 1969), writer and poet
- Yap Kim Hock (叶锦福; born 1970), Malaysian badminton player
- Yap Yee Guan (叶贻愿; born 1970), Malaysian badminton player
- Yap Yee Hup (叶贻合; born 1970), Malaysian badminton player
- Yeh Min-chih (葉民志; born 1970), Taiwanese actor
- Ye Pengzhi (叶鹏智; born 1971), CEO of Guangdong Aluminum
- Ye Zhibin (born 1971), football player and coach
- Françoise Yip (born 1972), Chinese-Canadian actress
- Gloria Yip (born 1973), Hong Kong actress
- Barry Ip (葉文輝; born 1974), Hong Kong singer and actor
- Ye Haiyan (born 1975), gender activist
- Gary Yap (born 1977), Malaysian television host
- Ye Jianming (born 1977), billionaire founder of CEFC China Energy
- Yelan (artist) (叶澜; born 1977), Chinese artist
- Yip Hon Weng (叶汉荣; born 1977), Singaporean politician
- Ip Pui Yi (born 1978), Hong Kong Olympic sports shooter
- Yeh Hsien-chung (born 1979), Taiwanese footballer
- Grace Ip (葉佩雯; born 1980), Hong Kong singer and actress
- Jaique Ip (born 1980), Hong Kong snooker player
- Michelle Ye (born 1980), actress and Miss Chinese International winner
- Ye Guangfu (叶光富, Chinese fighter pilot and taikonaut
- Tracy Ip (born 1981), Miss Hong Kong 2005
- Ye Jia (born 1981), football player
- Yeh Ting-jen (born 1983), Taiwanese baseball player
- Yap Weng Wah (born 1983), Singaporean criminal and serial sex offender
- Ye Yiqian (叶一茜; born 1984), singer and actress
- Ye Zuxin (叶祖新; born 1984), actor
- Brandon Yip (born 1985), Canadian NHL hockey player
- Yip Chi Ho (born 1985), Hong Kong footballer
- Ye Weiting (葉瑋庭; born 1985) Taiwanese singer
- Yeh Yung-chieh (born 1985), Taiwanese baseball player
- Raisyyah Rania Yeap (born Felixia Yeap Chin Yee 葉靜儀; born 1986), Malaysian model
- Anna Kay or Ye Xiqi (叶熙祺; born 1987), singer and actress
- Yip Pui Yin (born 1987), Hong Kong badminton player
- Ye Qing (叶青; born 1988), actress
- Sammi Yip (葉慧婷; born 1988), Hong Kong singer
- Ip Chung Long (born 1989), Hong Kong footballer
- Ye Weichao (born 1989), football player
- Yapp Hung Fai (born 1990), Hong Kong soccer goalkeeper
- Ruby Yap (叶俞均; born 1991), Malaysian-born Chinese actress and singer
- Ye Chongqiu (born 1992), football player
- Yip Pin Xiu (叶品秀; born 1992), Singaporean backstroke swimmer
- Noah Yap (葉榮耀; born 1993), Singaporean actor and singer
- Marcus Yap (born 1994), Singaporean power weightlifter
- Timothee Yap Jin Wei (born 1994), Singaporean sprinter
- Yap Cheng Wen (叶铮雯; born 1995), Malaysian badminton player
- Aloysius Yapp (叶浚惟; born 1996), Singaporean professional pool player
- Ye Shiwen (born 1996), swimmer, Olympic gold medalist and world record holder
- Ye Qiuyu (叶秋语; born 1997), Chinese table tennis player
- Yeh Shuhua (born 2000), Taiwanese singer, dancer, member of the South Korean group (G)I-DLE
- Yap Roy King (葉睿慶; born 2001), Malaysian badminton player
- Arthur Yap (born 1965), Filipino politician
- Carissa Yip (born 2003), American female chess player
- Bimby Yap (born 2007), Filipino child actor
- Christian Yap (born 1985), Filipino politician
- Christopherson Yap (born 1981), Filipino politician
- Edvic Yap (born 1977), Filipino politician
- Eric Yap (born 1979), Filipino politician
- John Geesnell Yap (born 1977), Filipino politician
- Jose Yap (1929-2010), Filipino lawyer and politician
- Susan Yap (born 1964), Filipino politician
- Victor Yap (born 1966), Filipino politician
- Enzo Yeh (born 2008), Taiwanese racing driver
- William W-G. Yeh, civil engineer
- Joshua Yap (葉添尊; born 1992), Singaporean, Monochrome Artist
- Amanda Yap (born 2009), Singaporean artistic gymnast
