= List of Malaysians by net worth =

This is a list of Malaysian billionaires based on an annual assessment of wealth and assets compiled and published by Forbes magazine in 2025.

== 2025 Malaysian billionaires list ==
World rank	Name	Citizenship	Net worth (USD)	Company	Main source of wealth
195	Robert Kuok	Malaysia	12.1 Billion	Kuok Group	Sugar plantation and hotels
274	Quek Leng Chan	Malaysia	9.9 billion	Hong Leong Capital	Banking and property
868	Koon Poh Keong	Malaysia	4.2 billion	Press Metal Aluminium Holdings	Manufacturing
979	Lee Thiam Wah	Malaysia	3.7 billion	99 Speedmart	Food and beverage
1045	Jeffrey Cheah	Malaysia	3.5 billion	Sunway Group	Real estate
1172	Lee Yeow Chor	Malaysia	3.1 billion	IOI Group	Food and beverage
1573	Lee Yeow Seng	Malaysia	2.3 billion	IOI Group	Food and beverage
1626	Syed Mokhtar Albukhary	Malaysia	2.2 billion	Albukhary Group of Companies	Construction and engineering
1947	Lim Kok Thay	Malaysia	1.8 billion	Genting Group	Gamblings and casinos
2019	Kie Chie Wong	Malaysia	1.7 billion	Fortescue	Investment
2110	Diona Teh Li Shian	Malaysia	1.6 billion	Public Bank Berhad	Finance and investment
2110	Lilian Teh Li Ming	Malaysia	1.6 billion	Public Bank Berhad	Finance and investment
2110	Lillyn Teh Li Hua	Malaysia	1.6 billion	Public Bank Berhad	Finance and investment
2356	Lau Cho Kun	Malaysia	1.4 billion	Hap Seng Consolidated	Palm oil and property
2356	Lim Chai Hock	Malaysia	1.4 billion	Bayan Resources	Coal
2479	Tan Yu Yeh	Malaysia	1.3 billion	MR.DIY	Retailing
2693	Cheah Cheng Hye	Malaysia	1.2 billion	Value Partners	Investment
2790	Lim Wee-Chai	Malaysia	1.1 billion	Top Glove	Rubber gloves

== See also ==
- The World's Billionaires
- List of countries by the number of billionaires
- List of Malaysian states by household income
