= Duke of Ye =

Early 5th century Kingdom of Chu general and minister

Shen Zhuliang
- 沈諸梁
- Born: circa 529 BCE
- Died: after 478 BCE
- Monuments: Mausoleum and Temple of Duke of Ye, Ye County, Henan
- Other name: Zigao (子高)
- Known for: Founding ancestor of the Ye surname
- Title: Duke of Ye; Lingyin (Prime Minister); Sima (Chief Military Commander)
- Parent: Shen Yin Shu (father)

Shen Zhuliang (Chinese: 沈諸梁; pinyin: Shěn Zhūliáng), Duke of Ye (葉公) or Gao, Duke of Ye (葉公高) (c. 529 BCE – after 478 BCE), was a general and Prime Minister of the Kingdom of Chu during the Spring and Autumn period of ancient China.

Shen Zhuliang's father Shen Yin Shu died in the historic Battle of Boju in 506 BCE. After his father's death, King Zhao of Chu enfeoffed Shen Zhuliang with the city of Ye (in present-day Ye County, Henan) at the northern frontier of the Chu kingdom. He was known as Ye Gong (Duke of Ye), and became the founding ancestor of the Ye surname, which is today the 42nd most common surname in China.

In 489 BCE, Confucius visited Shen Zhuliang in Ye, and their conversations were recorded in the Analects of Confucius.

In 478 BCE, during the reign of King Hui of Chu, Baigong Sheng, a grandson of King Ping, rebelled against King Hui, killed Prime Minister Zixi and Chief Military Commander Ziqi, making the top two government posts of Chu vacant, and kidnapped the king. Shen Zhuliang put down the rebellion of Baigong Sheng and restored the king's rule. Shen Zhuliang became the Prime Minister and Chief Military Commander.

He did not keep both posts for long. At the same year, he appointed the grandsons of King Ping, Gongsun Ning (son of Zixi) and Gongsun Kuan (son of Ziqi), as his successors as the Prime Minister and the Chief Military Commander respectively.

== Legend ==
In Liu Xiang's New Prefaces (新序), there was a story saying that the Duke of Ye loved dragons so much that the walls of his house were decorated with dragons. The real dragons in the heaven heard that and decided to visit him. But when he saw them, he fled in terror instead. The idiom “葉公好龍” was derived from this story, meaning that someone is pretending to like something which one actually dislikes or fears.

== Descendant ==
According to the New Book of Tang, Shen Zhuliang was an ancestor of the Shen clan of Wuxing (now in Huzhou), combining Shen Yue's record of his own genealogy in the Book of Song, Shen Chong, Shen Linzi (grandfather of Shen Yue), Shen Youzhi were all descendants of Shen Zhuliang.
