= HLCM =

HLCM can refer to:

- Hannah Lindahl Children's Museum, a museum in Mishawaka, Indiana
- High-Level Committee on Management, part of the United Nations System Chief Executives Board for Coordination
- Holcim Philippines, a cement producer in the Philippines affiliated with Holcim
- Hong Leong Company (Malaysia) Berhad, a subsidiary of Hong Leong Group
