= V-Nee Yeh =

Hong Kong businessman

V-Nee Yeh (Chinese: 葉維義; born February 14, 1959, in Hong Kong) is a businessman and was non-official member of the Executive Council of Hong Kong. He graduated from Milton Academy, cum laude '77; Williams College, BA' 81 Phi Beta Kappa, magna cum laude and Columbia Law School, JD 1984, Harlan Fiske Stone Scholar. He is a co-founder and honorary chairman of Value Partners Group Limited, the second largest in Asian based fund manager. He is also the co-founder and chairman of Argyle Street Management, an Asian distressed and special opportunities fund (ranked 22nd in Asia) and Cheetah Investment Management Group, which seeds and incubates other funds / fund managers. Vnee Yeh is also the past chairman of Hsin Chong Construction, a company founded by his grandfather, until he sold the controlling interest to The Mission Hills Group in 2007. Yeh is also a former trustee of Milton Academy, Massachusetts.

== Biography ==
Yeh is the elder of two children of Geoffrey Yeh, former managing director of Hsin Chong Construction, which was founded by his father. He attended Diocesan Boys' School, and graduated from Williams College and Columbia Law School.

Yeh is known for an unusual academic background. He concentrated on Marxist history at Williams, and was known as a leftist liberal. He then surprised his family and peers by entering law school at Columbia where he won numerous academic awards. After qualifying for the California Bar, Yeh yet again changed directions and accepted an offer to join Lazard Freres in New York and rose rapidly within the firm. He resigned as a partner in Lazard Brothers Capital Markets in London in 1990 in response to a call from his family to help restructure their various interests. In a series of path-breaking transactions in Hong Kong he split the family's holding company into two pieces, Hsin Chong Construction Group and Hsin Chong International Holdings. He then led an MBO of HCIH in 1992 which became known within the financial industry as an extremely astute transaction in light of the fact the bid was timed almost to the day to match the trough of the Asian shipping market. HCIH later repaid virtually all of the cost of the MBO just through the sale of HCIH's shipping fleet, leaving behind the bulk of the assets of the company with a zero cost base. In 1993, when Warren Buffett style value investing was virtually unknown in the region, and not available to the average investor, he co-founded Value Partners Limited with Cheah Cheng Hye to focus on the niche in Asia, and in particular Greater China. Since its IPO in the late 2000s the firm has grown many-fold. Value Partners is now one of the leading investment groups in the region and is listed on the Kong Kong Stock Exchange.

In 2002, Yeh co-founded Argyle Street Management, an Asian distressed and special opportunities fund (ranked 22nd in Asia) and in 2003 joined Cheetah Investment Management as chairman, re-structuring Cheetah to identify and capitalize on select Asian investment themes. Cheetah has since launched the Arcus Japan Value Fund, the Cheetah Korea Value Fund, the Pan Asia Fund, the Steel Partners China Access Fund and the Saizen REIT. Saizen REIT, a real estate investment trust holding a portfolio of Japanese Residential assets, is listed on the Singapore Exchange.

On 21 January 2009, it was announced that Yeh was appointed to the Executive Council of Hong Kong with immediate effect. Yeh stayed on until his term expired on 30 June 2012. Yeh, who was a non-executive director of Next Media Group, resigned the post on his appointment. For many, Yeh's appointment came as a total surprise. Yeh has never harboured any political ambition, nor demonstrated any political interest. In fact, he can be described as politically naive and socially shy. It is rumored that he turned down the appointment several times until pressed that it was a social duty in light of all he had been given. A social liberal at heart he is known to have a Jeffersonian political bent tempered by a strong stripe of "Volcker-like" economic conservatism. Yeh's views are shaped by his leftist experience in college and his professional exposure in finance. The common denominator is his belief in equity and opportunity for all, regardless of birth, class, race or background. Yeh supports democracy but with deep academic roots in constitutional law, understands the need to counterbalance the risks of "the tyranny of the majority". He acknowledges China's shortcomings ( and has not hesitated to criticize China's mistakes in the past) but over time has become a stronger and stronger supporter of China's gradualist approach in light of her size and complexity. Deeply affected by stories of the deprivation he heard from his family in China before the revolution, he is an outspoken admirer of China's progress in the last 3 decades and has paraphrased Churchill in stating that "never has so many owed so much to so few" (he is also not a blind apologist and has not been unwilling to voice concerns when mistakes have been made, to wit, he was not afraid to become a director of Next Media, when most Hong Kong business figures would have run as far as they could from the offer ). Yeh is a difficult animal to intellectually pigeon-hole and has often steered his own path. From his position in Exco, he has stated that his primary goal is to forge a political and social consensus to bring Hong Kong forward, and to further enhance its attractiveness as a financial centre, an urbane city, and a multi-cultural center with a unique quality of life.

== Personal life ==
V-Nee and Mira Yeh have one daughter, Nadya. Yeh is known as an avid water sportsman and extreme alpine skier. His singular claim to fame is skiing over 30 days a year whilst residing in HK where it never snows.
