= Penang Free School =

- Sekolah Menengah Kebangsaan Penang Free (Malay) 槟城大英义学 (Simplified Chinese)

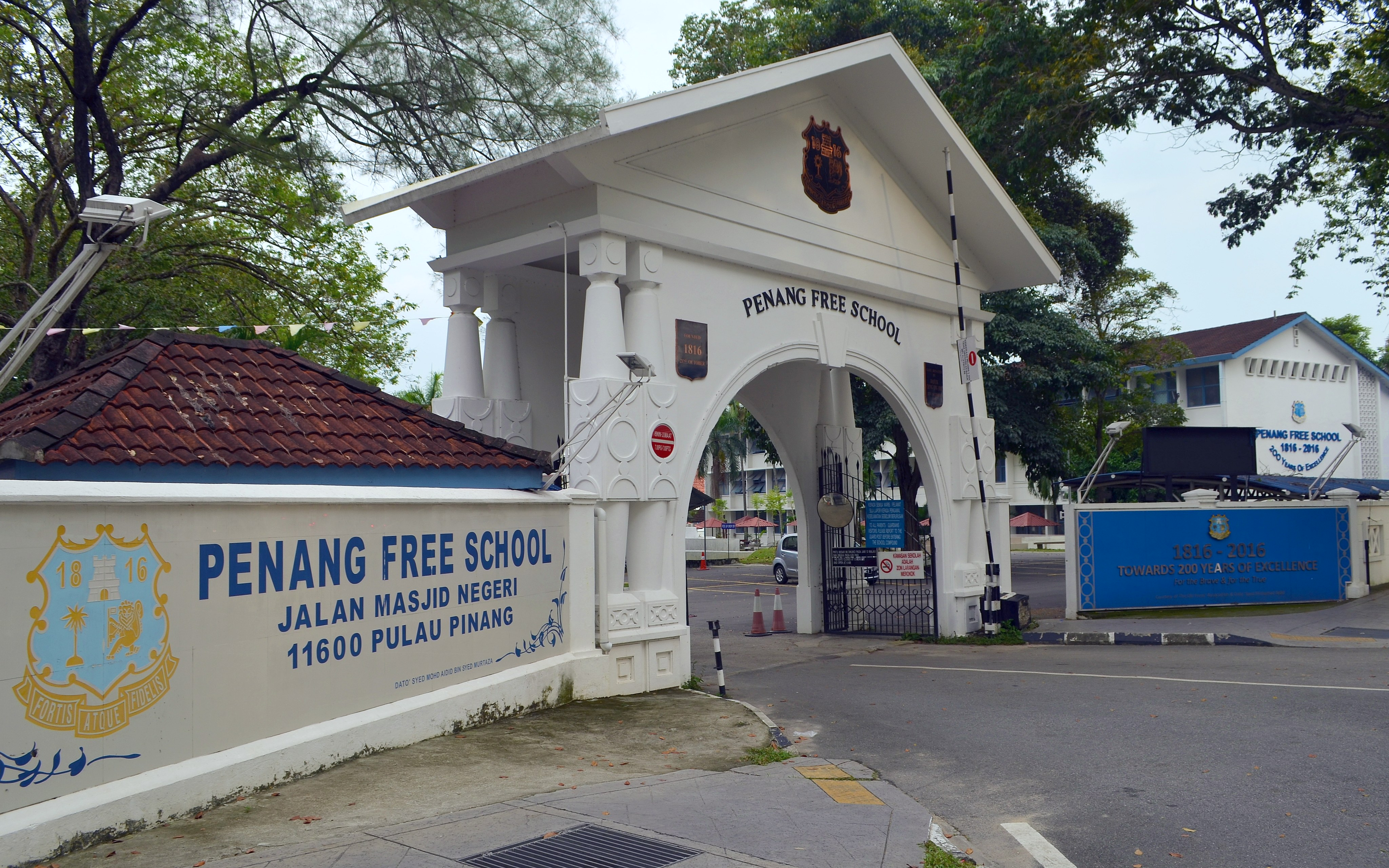
- Penang Free School main gate

Location
- Green Lane, George Town, Penang, 11600; Malaysia; 5.4028°N 100.3051°E

Information
- Type: National secondary school
- Motto: Latin: Fortis Atque Fidelis (Strong and Faithful)
- Established: 21 October 1816; 210 years ago
- Founder: Rev. Robert Sparke Hutchings
- School district: Northeast Penang Island
- Educational authority: Penang State Education Department (PPD Timur Laut)
- Session: Morning
- School code: PEB1094
- Principal: Mohd. Mukhrizam bin Mohd. Mothtar
- Teaching staff: 85
- Forms: 1-6
- Gender: Male; Co-educational (Form 6)
- Enrollment: 914 (2022)
- Colours: White and Azure
- Website: www.pfs.edu.my

Penang Free School (PFS), located at Green Lane in George Town, Penang, Malaysia, is the oldest English-medium school in Southeast Asia. Founded in 1816, its academic achievements led to its inclusion in the Malaysian Ministry of Education's Cluster School and High Performance School systems.

This secondary school has been an all-boys school since its inception, although girls are now admitted for Form 6. In addition, the school has produced several notable Malaysian and Singaporean personalities, including Tunku Abdul Rahman, P. Ramlee, Wu Lien-teh, Lim Chong Eu, Tuanku Syed Putra, Tuanku Syed Sirajuddin and Wee Chong Jin; its alumni are known as the 'Old Frees'.

Penang Free School maintains its historical rivalry with St. Xavier's Institution, another school in George Town which also claims the honour of being Malaysia's oldest school.

== History ==
The establishment of a 'free school' that was open to all ethnicities was first mooted by a committee led by Rev. Robert Sparke Hutchings in 1816. It was initially proposed that a boarding school would be built to provide education and daily care for orphans and the poor, and that the boarding school would consist of two blocks, one for male students and another for girls. Local Asian children would be taught in their mother tongues, while English would only be taught for those who desired it.

Penang Free School came into being on 21 October that year, with William Cox as its first principal, and was originally housed at Love Lane. This was a temporary arrangement, as the new school building at the adjoining Farquhar Street was still under construction. The building, situated next to St. George's Church, was completed in 1821.

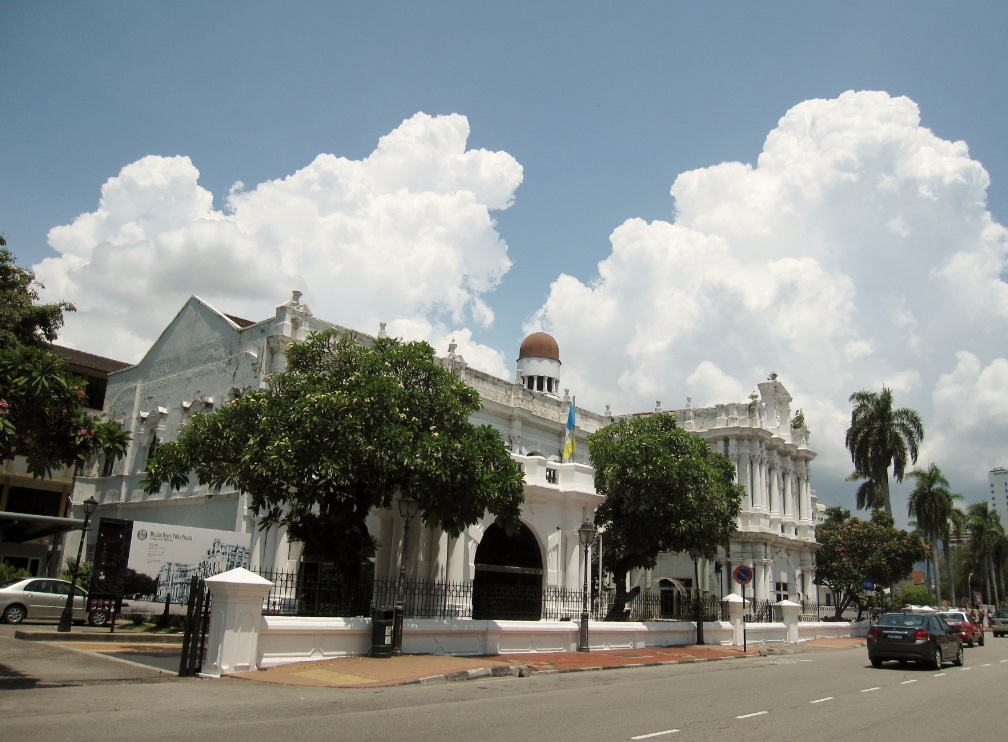
The Penang State Museum at Farquhar Street in the city centre once housed Penang Free School.

By the 1890s, as the school building became overcrowded, a tender was called for the construction of a new wing. The new wing, funded mainly by Chinese philanthropists such as Chung Keng Quee, was completed in 1896. Another wing was also built in 1906. In addition, English was made the standard medium of instruction within the school.

By the 1920s, the building was also reaching its maximum capacity. Therefore, plans were drawn up for the relocation of Penang Free School to a suburban site further inland, while the school premises at Farquhar Street was to be turned into a primary school. In 1928, Penang Free School was officially moved to a 30-acre (12 ha) site at Green Lane, where it remains to this day. The old school building was turned into Hutchings School; today, this particular building houses the Penang State Museum.

In 1958, the then Prime Minister of Malaya and an alumnus of Penang Free School, Tunku Abdul Rahman, opened the school's Form 6 block, making it the first school in northern Malaya to offer secondary education up to Form 6. More school blocks were added over the years, enabling it to switch to a single-session school system by 1992.

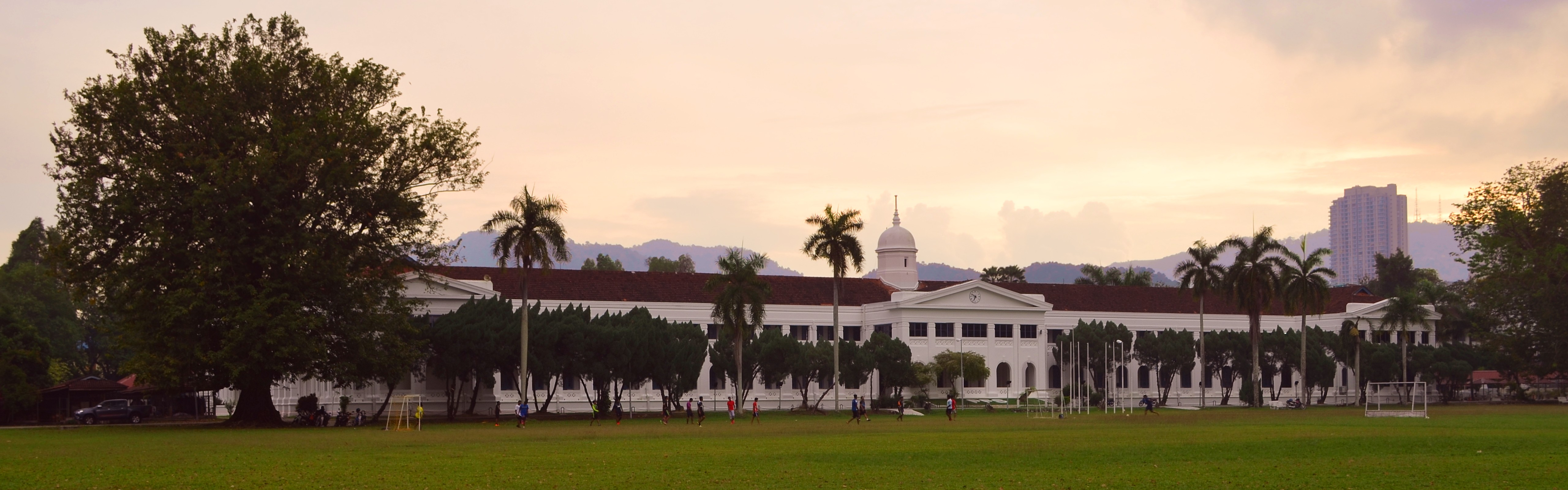
Panorama of Penang Free School at sunset

== List of principals ==
The following is a list of principals of Penang Free School.

Year	Name
1816–1821	William Cox
1821–1823	David Churcher
1823–1825	George Porter
1825–1827	William Anchant
1827–1829	William Anchant
1830–1843	John Colson Smith
1843–1846	Bruton
1846–1853	Fitzgerald
1853–1871	John Clark
1871–1892	George Griffin
1892–1904	William Hargreaves
1904–1925	Ralph H. Pinhorn
1925–1927	William Hamilton
1927–1928	D. R. Swaine
1928–1929	L. Arnold
1929–1931	D. W. McLeod
1931–1931	E. D. l. M. Stowell
1931	M. R. Holgate
1933–1935	J. Bain
1935–1941	L. W. Arnold
1945	Koay Kye Teong
1945–1946	N. R. Miller
1946–1947	J. N. Davies
1947–1950	D. Roper
1950–1951	P. F. Howitt
1951–1957	J. E. Tod
1957–1963	J. M. B. Hughes
1963	Brian Smith
1963–1968	Tan Boon Lin
1969–1971	Poon Poh Kong
1972–1974	K. G. Yogam
1974	Lim Boon Hor
1974–1979	Goon Fatt Chee
1979	Lim Chin Kee
1979–1982	R. Visvanathan
1983–1988	G. Krishna Iyer
1988–1993	Goh Hooi Beng
1993–2000	Hj. Ismail bin Ibramsa
2000–2002	Abdul Rahman
2002–2004	Arabi Sulaiman
2004–2006	Yusof bin Omar
2007–2012	Hj. Ramli bin Din
2012–2017	Jalil bin Saad
2017–2019	Omar bin Abdul Rashid
2019–2022	Shamsul Fairuz bin Mohd Nor
2022–2025	Syed Sultan bin Shaik Oothuman
2026–	Mohd. Mukhrizam bin Mohd. Mothtar

== Notable alumni ==
- Ahmad Ibrahim
  - Singapore's Minister for Health (1959–1961)
  - Minister for Labour (1961–1962)
- Cheah Cheng Hye
  - Co-founder, Chairman and Co-Chief Investment Officer of Hong Kong's Value Partners Group Limited
- Danny Quah
  - Li Ka Shing Professor of Economics at the Lee Kuan Yew School of Public Policy, National University of Singapore
- Dennis Lee
  - Pianist
- Eusoffe Abdoolcadeer
  - Former Malaysian Supreme Court judge
- G. Rama Iyer
  - Secretary-General of Malaysia's Primary Industries Ministry
- Ismail Merican
  - Former Director-General of Malaysia's Ministry of Health
- Jomo Kwame Sundaram
  - Assistant Secretary General for Economic Development in the United Nations Department of Economic and Social Affairs (DESA)
- Lim Chong Eu
  - Second Chief Minister of Penang
- Lim Chong Keat
  - Architect of Komtar, the tallest skyscraper in Penang
- P. Ramlee
  - Film actor, director, singer, songwriter, composer and producer
- King Sirajuddin
  - Raja of Perlis and former King of Malaysia (2001–2006)
- Subramaniam Sathasivam
  - Minister of Health (Malaysia), Member of Parliament
- Tan Boon Teik
  - Former Attorney-General of Singapore (1967–1992) and a founder of the Singapore Symphony Orchestra
- Tan Hock Eng
  - President & CEO, Broadcom Ltd
- Tan Seang Beng
  - Director of Spine Service, Singapore General Hospital
- Tengku Ahmad Rithauddeen Ismail
  - Former Foreign Minister and Defence Minister (Malaysia)
- Tunku Abdul Rahman
  - Founding father of Malaya and the first Prime Minister of Malaysia
- Wee Chong Jin
  - First Chief Justice of Singapore
- Wu Lien-teh
  - Medical doctor and nominee for the Nobel Prize in Medicine in 1935
- Yeoh Ghim Seng
  - Longest-serving Speaker of the Parliament of Singapore (1970–1989)
- Tan Sri Dato' (Dr) Abdul Rahim Abdul Rahman
  - Founder of Rahim & Co | President of the Malaysian Senator's Council (2015)

== Sport House ==
• P.Ramlee • Wu Lien Teh • Pinhorn • Hargreaves • Cheeseman • Sirajuddin • Tunku Putra • Hamilton

== Gallery ==
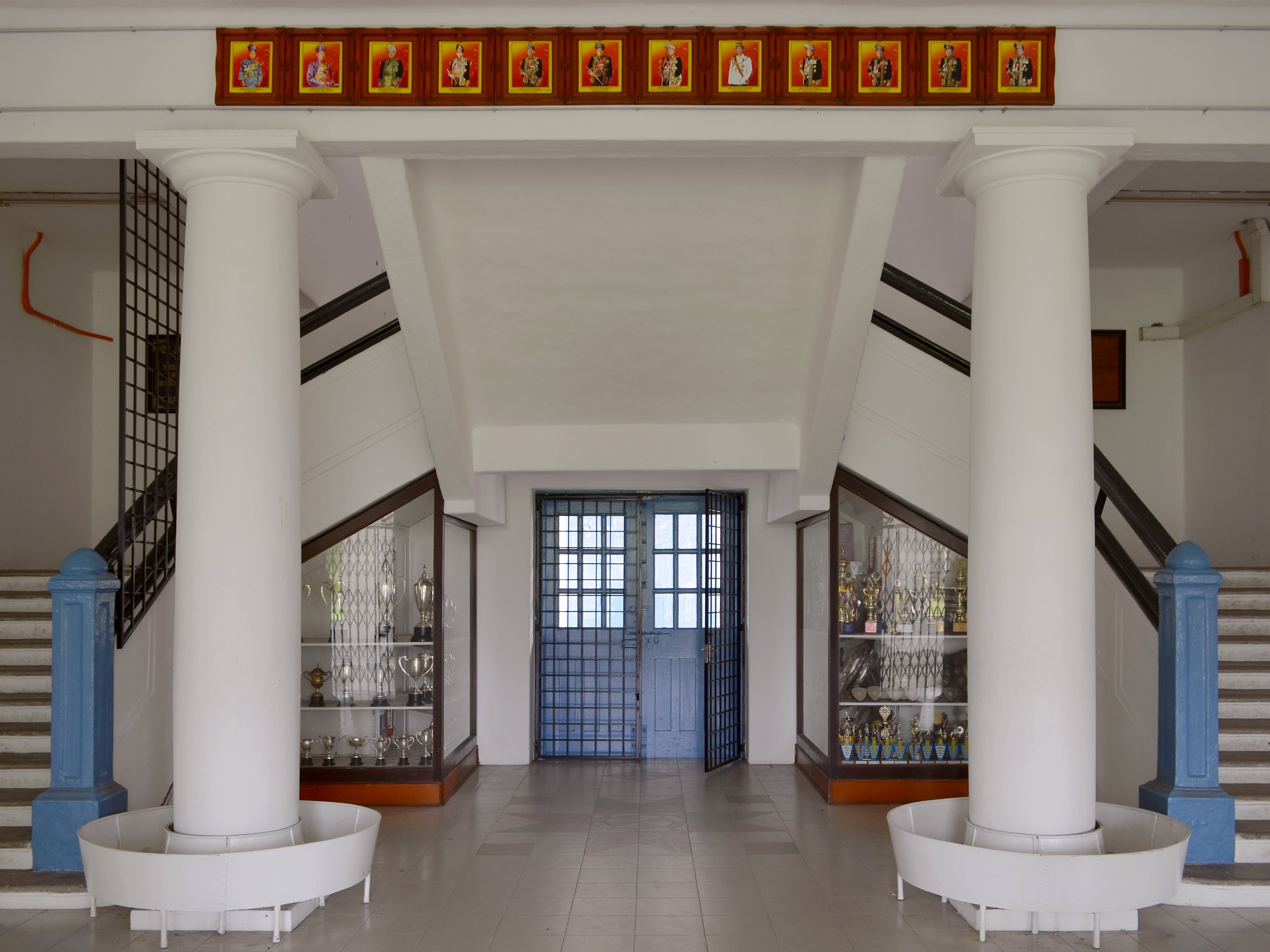
Foyer with trophies

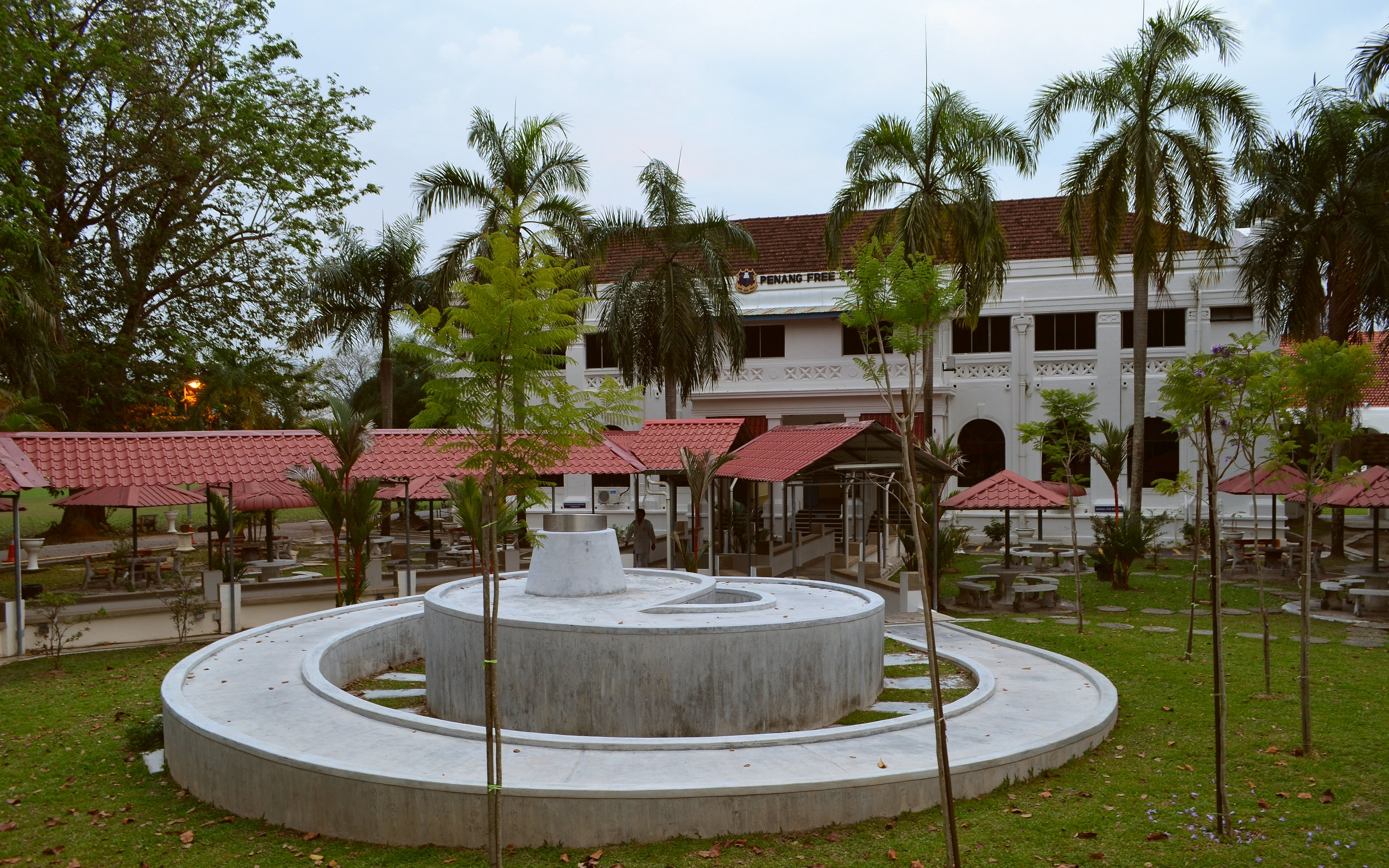
Fountain sculpture

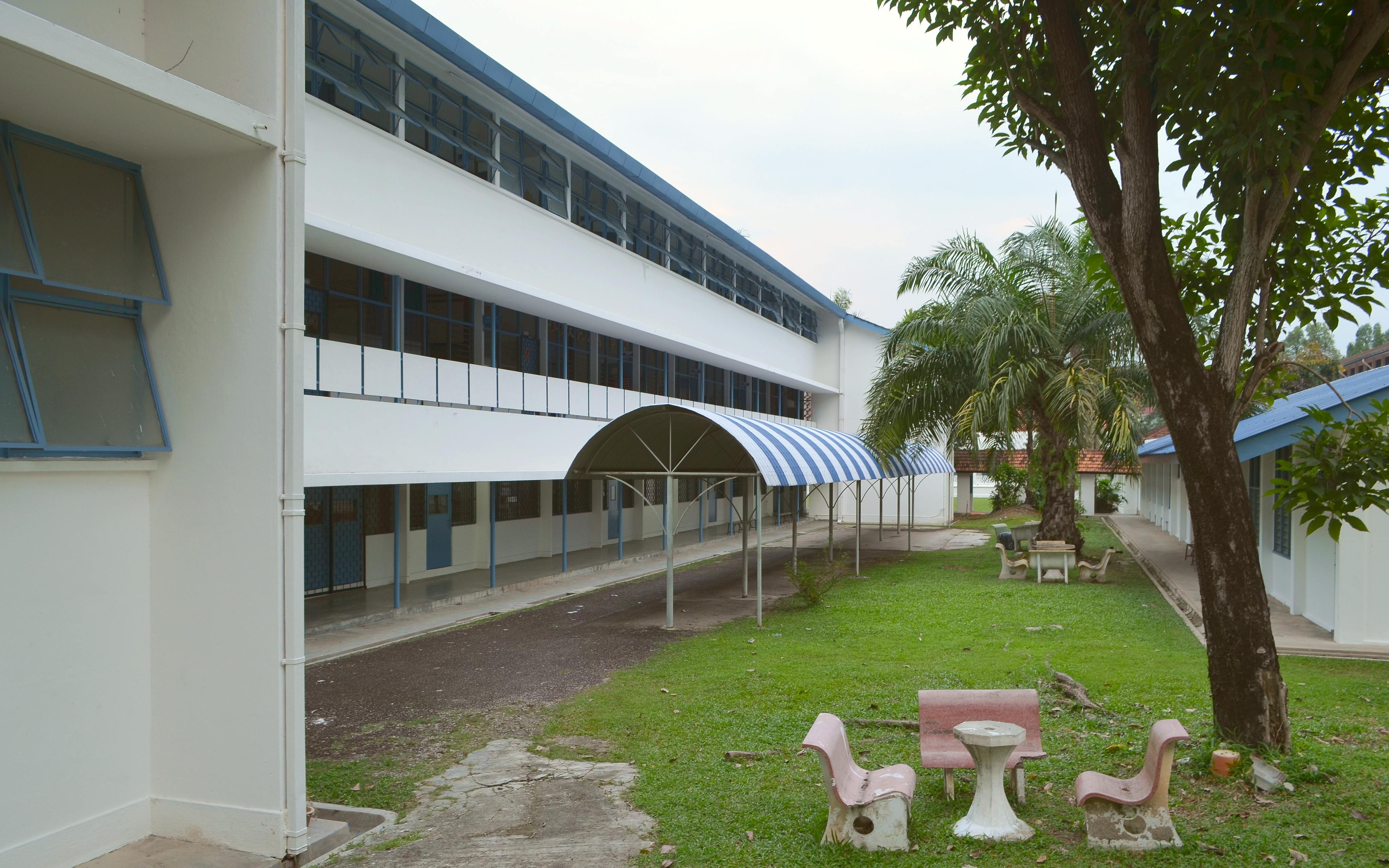
Form 6 block

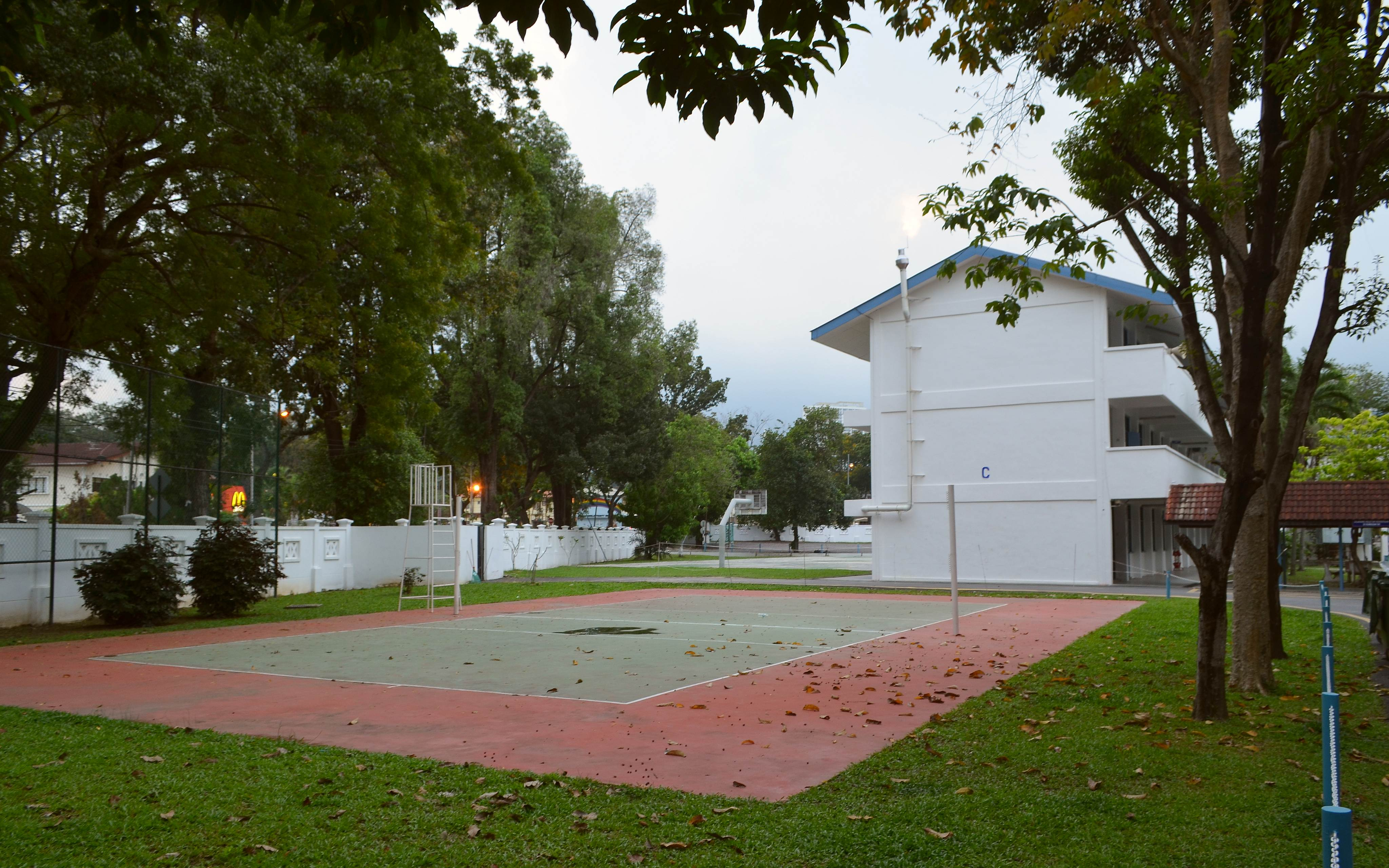
Volleyball court

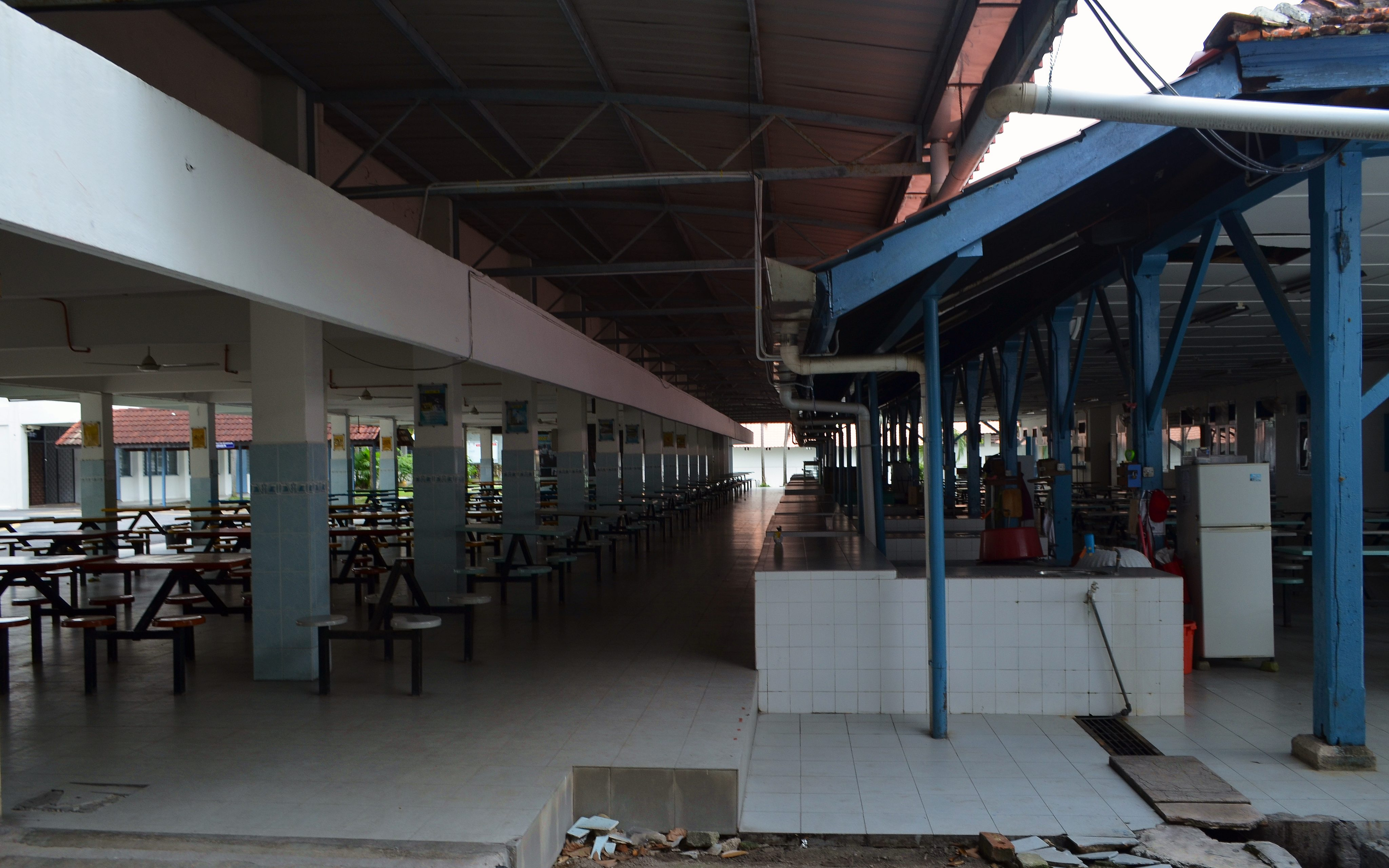
Canteen

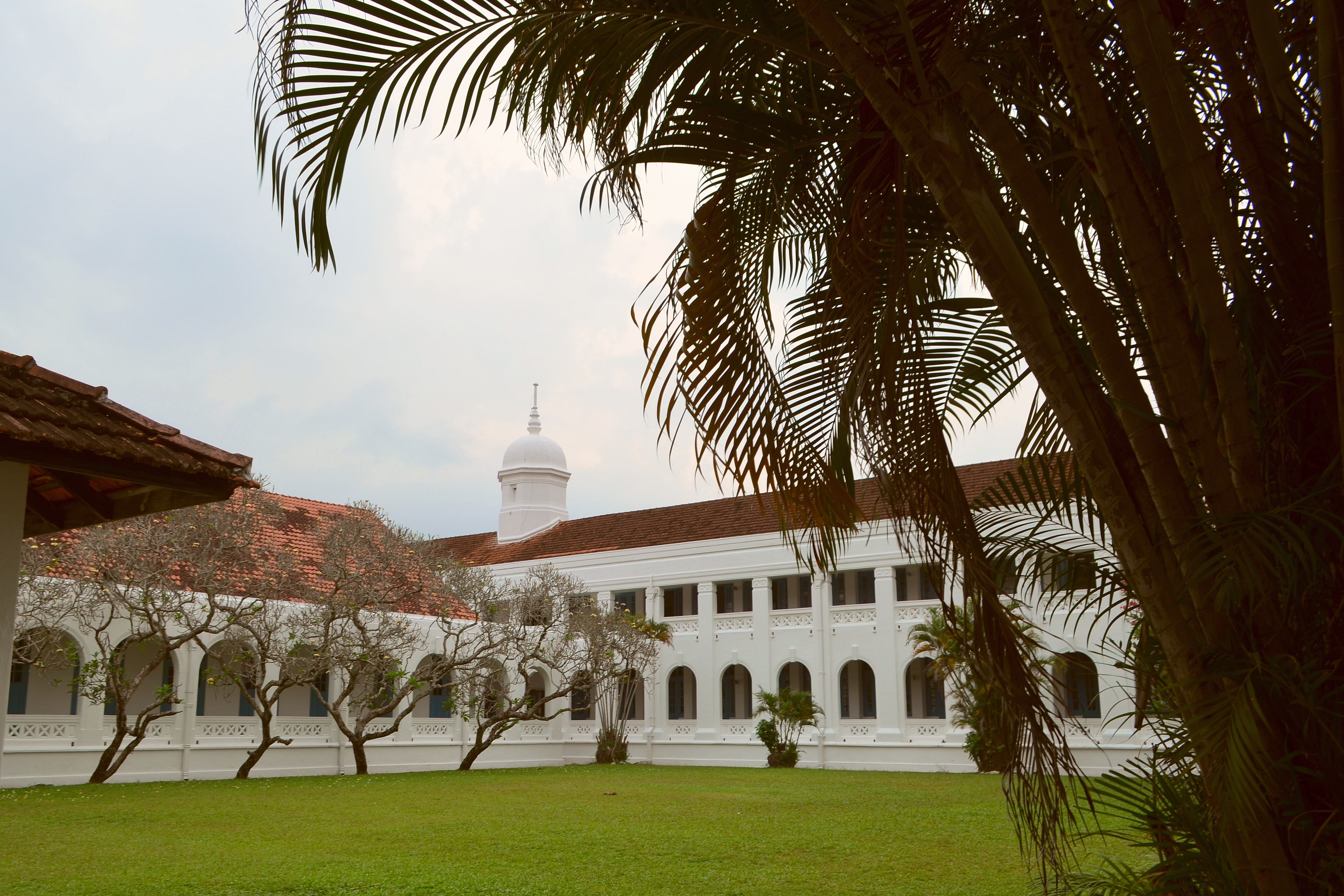
East quadrangle

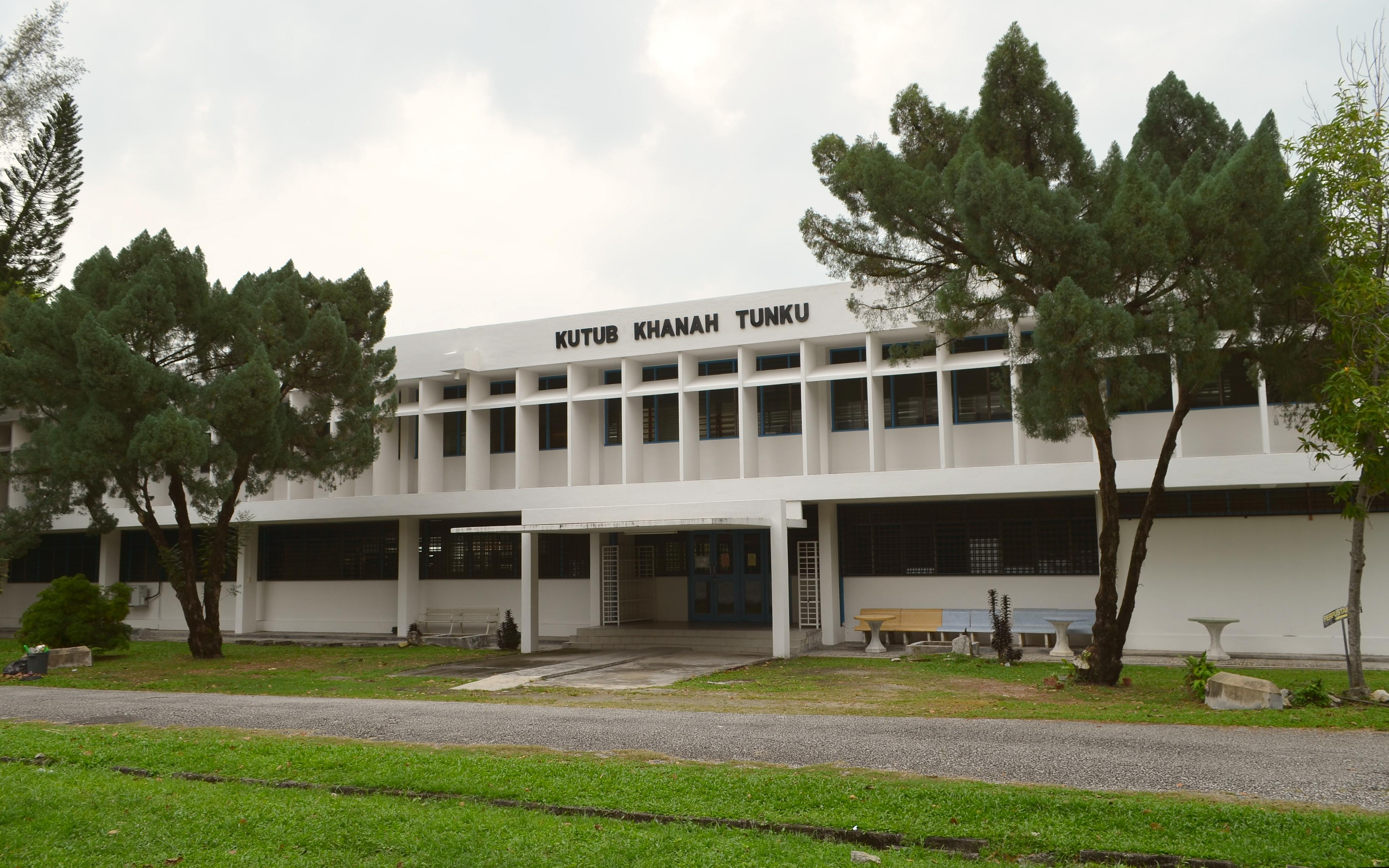
Library

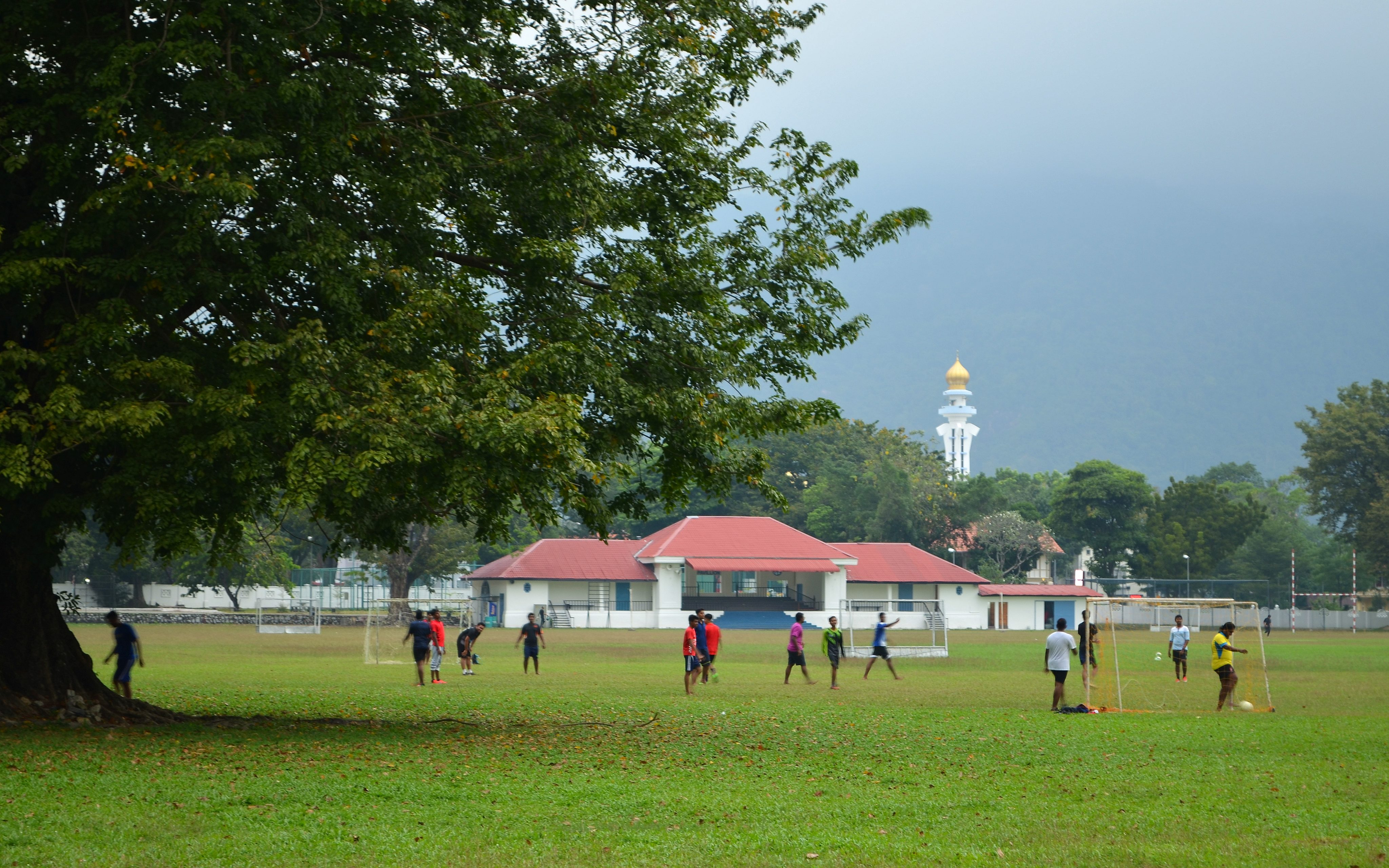
Playing field
