= Ye Zhupei =

- Born: 1902; Manila, American Philippines
- Died: 24 November 1971 (aged 68–69); China
- Resting place: Babaoshan Revolutionary Cemetery
- Other names: Yap Chu-Phay, Yeh Chu-p'ei
- Education: Colorado School of Mines; University of Chicago; University of Pennsylvania
- Known for: Founding chemical metallurgy in China
- Spouse: Marcelia Vance Yeh
- Children: 2 sons, 2 daughters
- Scientific career
- Fields: Chemical metallurgy
- Workplaces: Institute of Chemical Metallurgy, Chinese Academy of Sciences

Chinese name
- Traditional Chinese: 葉渚沛
- Simplified Chinese: 叶渚沛
Transcriptions
Standard Mandarin
- Hanyu Pinyin: Yè Zhūpèi
- Wade–Giles: Yeh^{4} Chu^{1}-p'ei^{4}
Yue: Cantonese
- Jyutping: Jip^{6} Zyu^{2} Pui^{3}
Southern Min
- Hokkien POJ: Ia̍p Chú-phài

Ye Zhupei or Yap Chu-Phay (Chinese: 叶渚沛; 1902 – 24 November 1971) was a Chinese physical chemist, chemical engineer, and metallurgist. Born into an overseas Chinese family in the Philippines and educated in the United States, he moved to China in the 1930s and served in both the Kuomintang and the Communist governments. Considered the founder of chemical metallurgy in China, he was elected a founding member of the Chinese Academy of Sciences (CAS) in 1955 and established the Institute of Chemical Metallurgy (now Institute of Process Engineering) of the CAS in 1958. He was persecuted during the Cultural Revolution and died in prison after five years of incarceration.

== Early life and career in the United States ==
Ye Zhupei (or Yap Chu-Phay in Hokkien) was born in 1902 in Manila, American Philippines, into an overseas Chinese family that originated from Xiamen, Fujian. His father, Ye Duxing (叶独醒), was a businessman and follower of the revolutionary leader Sun Yat-sen. He entered Colorado School of Mines in the United States in 1921, and subsequently earned an M.S. from the University of Chicago and his Ph.D. in physical chemistry of metals from the University of Pennsylvania in 1929.

Ye worked as an engineer for Union Carbide and Central Alloy Steel Corporation, and later as engineer and director of the metallurgy department of American Machine and Foundry Company. While in the US, he published more than 10 papers in scientific journals and developed the use of thermodynamics in the study of iron-carbon alloys, which attracted much attention from metallurgists.

== Republic of China ==
In 1933, Ye moved to the Republic of China to serve in the National Defense Design Council of the Kuomintang government in Nanjing. He was appointed director of the laboratory for metallurgy, which was established at his suggestion. After the Second Sino-Japanese War broke out in 1937, Ye relocated with the Kuomintang government to the wartime capital of Chongqing, where he led the production of strategic materials, such as electrolytic copper and special steel, which were urgently needed for the war effort.

After the 1941 New Fourth Army incident, during which the Kuomintang attacked the New Fourth Army led by the Communist Party, their nominal ally in the Anti-Japanese War, Ye arranged for the Communist leader Zhou Enlai to secretly meet the British embassy to impart the Communists' version of events. He also donated funds to support the Communist headquarters in Yan'an.

In 1944, Ye visited Europe and the United States to catch up with technological advances in the developed world. After the end of World War II, he served as vice director of the science committee of UNESCO, under director Joseph Needham.

== People's Republic of China ==
After the founding of the People's Republic of China in 1949, Ye moved to China in 1950 with his wife Marcelia and their one-year-old son. He was elected a founding member of the Chinese Academy of Sciences (CAS) in 1955. In 1958, he established the Institute of Chemical Metallurgy (now Institute of Process Engineering) of the CAS and served as the founding director. In addition, he recruited Chen Jiayong to help develop hydrometallurgy at the institute.

After examining the shortcomings of China's steel industry, Ye suggested the application of the "three high method": high pressure, temperature, and humidity, and Shijingshan Steel built a test furnace according to his specification. He also solved key technical problems at Panzhihua Iron and Steel and Baotou Steel. He published more than 100 papers and won multiple State Science and Technology Prizes.

However, many of his far-sighted proposals were not adopted at the time. He advocated the development of oxygen converter process for steelmaking, but others insisted on building large open hearth furnaces, a technology that was becoming obsolete. He advocated the use of computers for metallurgical research, and was ostracized by those who could not understand the connection. In 1952, he proposed simultaneous mining of iron ore and rare earths at the Bayan Obo mine, whereas Soviet experts preferred to focus on iron ore only. The Chinese government adopted the Soviet proposal, and only came to fully realize the value of the rare earth resources of Bayan Obo decades later.

Ye was elected a member of the 2nd and 3rd National Committee of the Chinese People's Political Consultative Conference (CPPCC). In 1964, he was elected a Standing Committee member of the 3rd National People's Congress. When the Cultural Revolution erupted in 1966, however, he was persecuted and imprisoned by the Red Guards. He spent the final five years of his life in custody, during which time he wrote technical papers and proposals totaling 200,000 words. He suffered from colon cancer and died in prison on 24 November 1971.

== Legacy ==
Ye was posthumously rehabilitated after the end of the Cultural Revolution and recognized as the founder of chemical metallurgy in China. On 10 July 1978, a grand ceremony was held for his interment at the Babaoshan Revolutionary Cemetery in Beijing. Vice Premier Fang Yi, who presided over the ceremony, declared him the "People's Scientist". In articles published in 1987 in Ye's memory, the prominent scientist Yan Jici praised his contributions to China which went far beyond the field of metallurgy, the entrepreneurial spirit that his career was imbued with, and his devotion to truth even under extremely difficult circumstances.

== Personal life ==
On February 19, 1927 Ye Zhupei married illustrator Louise D. Cook, who was previously married to poet Ralph Cheyney. She took on the name Weda Yap. They divorced in the 1940s.

While a visiting scientist in New York City, Ye Zhupei met his second wife Marcelia Vance Yeh, an Irish-American from Ohio, through their friends Toshi and Pete Seeger. They had a son, Kippy, and moved to China when he was a year old. Ye Zhupei has an older son, Liangxi Ye prior to meeting Marcelia. In China Marcelia gave birth to two daughters, Suzanna and Cathy. She taught English at Yenching University, which later merged into Peking University, for 25 years. Among her students were many high-ranking Chinese and Korean officials, including Foreign Minister Li Zhaoxing. After retiring in 1976 at age 60, she returned to the United States and earned a master's degree in creative writing from University of California, Berkeley. She became a writer, publishing short stories and the poetry collection Hillegass Street, and later returned to teach at Peking University for another semester. She died in Berkeley on 2 February 2008, at the age of 91.

As he grew up in the Philippines and the United States, Ye was more fluent in English than Mandarin Chinese, which he spoke with a heavy Hokkien accent.
