= Chen Jiayong =

Chinese hydrometallurgist and chemical engineer

- Born: 17 February 1922; Jintang County, Sichuan, China
- Died: 26 August 2019 (aged 97); Beijing, China
- Resting place: Babaoshan Revolutionary Cemetery
- Other name: Chia-yung Chen
- Education: University of Illinois at Urbana–Champaign; National Central University
- Known for: Developing hydrometallurgy in China
- Spouse: Liu Rong
- Children: 2
- Awards: State Science and Technology Prizes (five times); Ho Leung Ho Lee Prize (1996)
- Scientific career
- Fields: Chemical engineering Hydrometallurgy
- Workplaces: Institute of Process Engineering, Chinese Academy of Sciences
- Doctoral advisor: H.F. Johnstone
- Other academic advisors: Gao Jiyu, Sherlock Swann

Chinese name
- Traditional Chinese: 陳家鏞
- Simplified Chinese: 陈家镛
Transcriptions
Standard Mandarin
- Hanyu Pinyin: Chén Jiāyōng
- Wade–Giles: Ch'ên2 Chia1-yung1

Chen Jiayong (Chinese: 陈家镛; also romanized as Chia-yung Chen; 17 February 1922 – 26 August 2019) was a Chinese metallurgist and chemical engineer. He was a research professor and Vice President of the Institute of Process Engineering of the Chinese Academy of Sciences (CAS). A pioneer in the development of hydrometallurgy in China, he was elected an academician of the CAS in 1980. He was awarded the State Science and Technology Prizes five times and the Ho Leung Ho Lee Prize for Scientific and Technological Progress in 1996.

== Early life and education ==
Chen was born on 17 February 1922 in Jintang County, Sichuan. He was the fourth child and eldest son of his father Chen Songpu (陈松谱), a school teacher. In 1925, his family moved to Chengdu, where he studied at Chengdu County Primary School and Chengdu County High School (now Chengdu No. 7 High School).

In 1939, he was admitted to the Department of Chemical Engineering of National Central University, then exiled in Chongqing during the Second Sino-Japanese War. He studied under some of the then top chemists of the country, including Du Changming, Gao Jiyu, and Shi Jun. After graduating in 1943, he was hired by the university as a faculty member. Under the guidance of Gao Jiyu, he was the first in China to successfully synthesize the pesticide DDT.

== Career in the United States ==
After the end of World War II, Chen was awarded a Chinese government scholarship to pursue graduate studies in the United States in 1947. He earned his master's and Ph.D. (in 1952) from the University of Illinois at Urbana–Champaign (UIUC), under the supervision of Sherlock Swann and H.F. Johnstone.

In 1952, he became a postdoctoral researcher at the Massachusetts Institute of Technology, before returning to UIUC to work under Johnstone. His highly cited paper "Filtration of Aerosols by Fibrous Media" was published in the journal Chemical Reviews in 1955. In 1954, he became a research engineer at the Yerkes Research Laboratory of the chemical company DuPont.

== Career in China ==
In 1956, the American government reached an agreement with the PRC to permit Chinese students in the US to go home, who had been banned from moving back to China since the Korean War. Chen and his wife decided to return to China with their two daughters. On the invitation of the renowned metallurgist Ye Zhupei (Yap Chu-Phay), he accepted the position as Director of the Hydrometallurgical Laboratory of the Institute of Chemical Metallurgy (renamed as the Institute of Process Engineering in 2001), which was then being established by Ye under the Chinese Academy of Sciences (CAS).

Although not specifically trained in metallurgy, Chen accepted the challenge to develop hydrometallurgy in China. Hydrometallurgy, a more energy-efficient and cleaner process than traditional pyrometallurgy, is especially suitable for the extraction of uranium, copper, and other non-ferrous metals. He spent years working under harsh conditions at the copper mine of Dongchuan, Yunnan, and oversaw the construction of a copper factory nearby, which was opened in 1964. He also worked at the mines in Jinchuan, Gansu and Panzhihua, Sichuan, and made technological breakthroughs to efficiently separate non-ferrous metals such as gold, silver, copper, nickel, and cobalt. During the Cultural Revolution, the technologies he developed were exported to Albania as part of China's foreign-aid program. He later served as Vice President of the Institute of Process Engineering.

Chen supervised more than 50 graduate students, and published reference books including A Handbook on Hydrometallurgy (湿法冶金手册). He was awarded the State Science and Technology Prizes five times and the Ho Leung Ho Lee Prize for Scientific and Technological Progress in 1996. Chen was elected an academician of the Chinese Academy of Sciences in 1980.

In 2017, the CAS named China's first satellite for chemical engineering experiment after Chen. The CHEN Jiayong-1 was launched into space from India in February 2017. It was the first satellite named after a Chinese scientist.

Chen was a member of the Chinese Communist Party. He served five consecutive terms as a member of the 4th to the 8th National Committees of the Chinese People's Political Consultative Conference.

== Death ==
On 26 August 2019, he died in Beijing at the age of 97. He was buried at the Babaoshan Revolutionary Cemetery.

== Personal life ==
In 1948, Chen married his university classmate Liu Rong (刘蓉) in the United States. The couple had two daughters.
