= Ralph Henry Pinhorn =

British educationalist

Ralph Henry Pinhorn OBE
- Born: 11 July 1871
- Died: 1 May 1938 (aged 66)
- Occupation: Educationalist
- Years active: 1896-1925
- Spouse: Hilda Mary Good
- Children: 3

Ralph Henry Pinhorn OBE (11 July 1871 – 1 May 1938) was a British educationalist and headmaster of the Penang Free School, the oldest English-medium school in Southeast Asia, from 1904 to 1925.

== Early life and education ==
Ralph Henry Pinhorn was born on 11 July 1871, son of Rev C. A. Pinhorn, vicar of Hanney, Berkshire. He was educated at Wolverhampton School and at Keble College, Oxford where he gained second class honours in modern history, and then secured a diploma in education and MA.

In 1896, Pinhorn began his career at the Royal Masonic School, Bushey, Hertfordshire where he served as house master until 1904.

In December 1904, Pinhorn was appointed headmaster of the Penang Free School in the Straits Settlements by the school's committee and took up the position February 1905. His predecessor, William Hargreaves, who had been headmaster since 1891, had succeeded in raising the level of education at the boys' school, and Pinhorn continued its progress, improving the overall operation of the school and introducing innovations into the system of organisation which continue to be practised. He was the first in Malaya to introduce regular sports for all pupils, and clubs and societies were established to increase participation to supplement learning in the classroom. In 1920, he became the first patron of the Old Frees' Association for former students and staff.

== Retirement and death ==
Known as the greatest headmaster in the school's history, he remained its head for 20 years, retiring in 1925 due to ill health. He and his wife went to live in Oxford where he tutored overseas students which included acting as guardian to the sons of the Sultan of Terengganu. He died in Oxford on 1 May 1938, aged 66, after having been ill with influenza and pneumonia.

== Honours and legacy ==
In 1923, he was awarded the Order of the British Empire in recognition of his services to education. Pinhorn Road in Penang is named after him.
