= Chu Lam Yiu =

Chinese businesswoman

Chu Lam Yiu (Chinese: 朱林瑶) is a Chinese billionaire and the founder of Huabao International Holdings (SEHK: 336, SZSE: 300741), a fragrances and tobacco flavoring company.

She founded the company in 1996 and took it public on the Hong Kong Stock Exchange through a "backdoor listing" in 2006.

== Life and Career ==
She founded her first daily-use flavors and fragrances company in Beijing in 1990 and established Huabao International Holdings Limited in 2004. In August 2006, Huabao International was listed in Hong Kong. In 2018, she led Huabao Shares to list on the Shenzhen Stock Exchange. In 2024, the company signed a land acquisition agreement for a production base in Jakarta, Indonesia. In 2021, she ranked 11th on the Hu Run Women Entrepreneurs List with a wealth of 49 billion yuan.

According to Forbes, she is one of China's richest women with a net worth of USD 2.4 billion in 2022. In 2022, she was placed under investigation for "suspected disciplinary violations" along with her son, Lam Ka Yu, as the Chinese government began cracking down on corruption in the tobacco industry. Her daughter, Lam Ka Yan, a Columbia University graduate, was named an executive director at the company amid the government probe. On 14 July 2023, the company was notified that the Changsha County Public Security Bureau had revoked the criminal compulsory measures against its ultimate controller Chu Lam Yiu and Board Director Lin Jiayu.
