= Salubris Pharmaceuticals =

Chinese pharmaceutical company

Shenzhen Salubris Pharmaceuticals (Chinese: 深圳信立泰药业; pinyin: Shēnzhèn Xìnlìtài Yàoyè; SZSE: 002294) is a Chinese pharmaceutical company.

Founded in November 1998 and based in Shenzhen, it has a market cap of US$4.4 billion, 3,121 employees and annual sales of $553 million as of 2019.

Shenzhen Salubris is headed by the billionaire Ye Chenghai.
