= Value Partners =

Hong Kong-based asset management company

Value Partners Group Limited 惠理集團有限公司
- Company type: Public
- Traded as: SEHK: 806
- Industry: Investment management
- Founded: 1993; 33 years ago
- Founders: Cheah Cheng Hye; V-Nee Yeh
- Headquarters: Hong Kong
- Area served: Worldwide
- Key people: Cheah Cheng Hye (Chairman); June Wong (CEO)
- AUM: $5.9 billion (as of March 31, 2023)
- Website: valuepartners-group.com

Value Partners Group Limited is a Hong Kong–based asset management company.

== History ==
The company was founded in 1993 as a boutique firm by the present Chairman & Co-chief investment officer Dato' Seri Cheah Cheng Hye, and businessman Yeh V-nee, a non-official member of the Executive Council of Hong Kong from 2009 to 2012.

Value Partners positions itself as a value investor and adopts value investing strategy for its funds. Headquartered in Hong Kong, Value Partners has offices in Beijing, Shanghai, Shenzhen, Singapore, Kuala Lumpur and London. It has a global client base and is regarded as one of Asia's largest asset management firms by the industry.

Value Partners was listed on the Hong Kong Stock Exchange (Stock code: 806 HK) in November 2007 and it is the first asset management firm listed in Hong Kong.

In 2018, Value Partners was listed among the 200 top-performing public companies on Forbes Asia's "Best Under A Billion list." It dropped off that list in 2019.

Value Partners disposed its 49% equity interests in Goldstate Capital Fund Management Co., Ltd. to a company under Yunnan Jiutian Investment Enterprises Ltd in 2015, for a consideration of RMB45 million.

In 2019, Value Partners launched an investment fund towards China for British and European investors after demands for this service had increased. The move comes one year after an assessment by American asset manager Northern Trust, which found that Asian investment funds find it difficult to compete in the European market. According to the study, Value Partners only sourced $211 million, accounting for just 1.3% of its total assets under management.

In June 2023, GF Securities announced it would acquire a 20.2% stake in Value Partners.
