= Lam Wai Ying =

Chinese business executive

- Known for: Chair and co-owner, Biel Crystal Manufactory
- Spouse: Yeung Kin-man

Lam Wai Ying (Chinese: 林惠英; pinyin: Lín Huìyīng) is a Chinese billionaire businesswoman, and the chair and 49% owner of Biel Crystal Manufactory, manufacturer of touch screens for smartphones. She co-founded Biel with her husband Yeung Kin-man (楊建文). As of December 2020, her net worth was estimated at US$9.3 billion.

== Career ==
Lam's Biel Crystal is based in Kwun Tong, Hong Kong, and its manufacturing facilities are based in China, which employs about 100,000 people.

In November 2017, Lam was assessed by Forbes as being the 67th most powerful woman in the world.

Lam is also the co-owner of High Grand Development, a real estate development company. In 2018, Lam was ranked #5 as the Top 10 Richest Self-Made Women in the World. Technically, her husband owns 51% of Biel Crystal while she owns the remaining 49%. In January 2017, the couple purchased a HK$2.8 billion property in Hong Kong's Victoria Peak through their real estate investment vehicle High Grand Development, an 8-apartment they plan to redevelop into a single private home.

== Personal life ==
Lam's husband is Yeung Kin-man, co-founder and CEO of Biel Crystal. They live in Hong Kong.
