= Ye County =

Ye County 叶县
- County
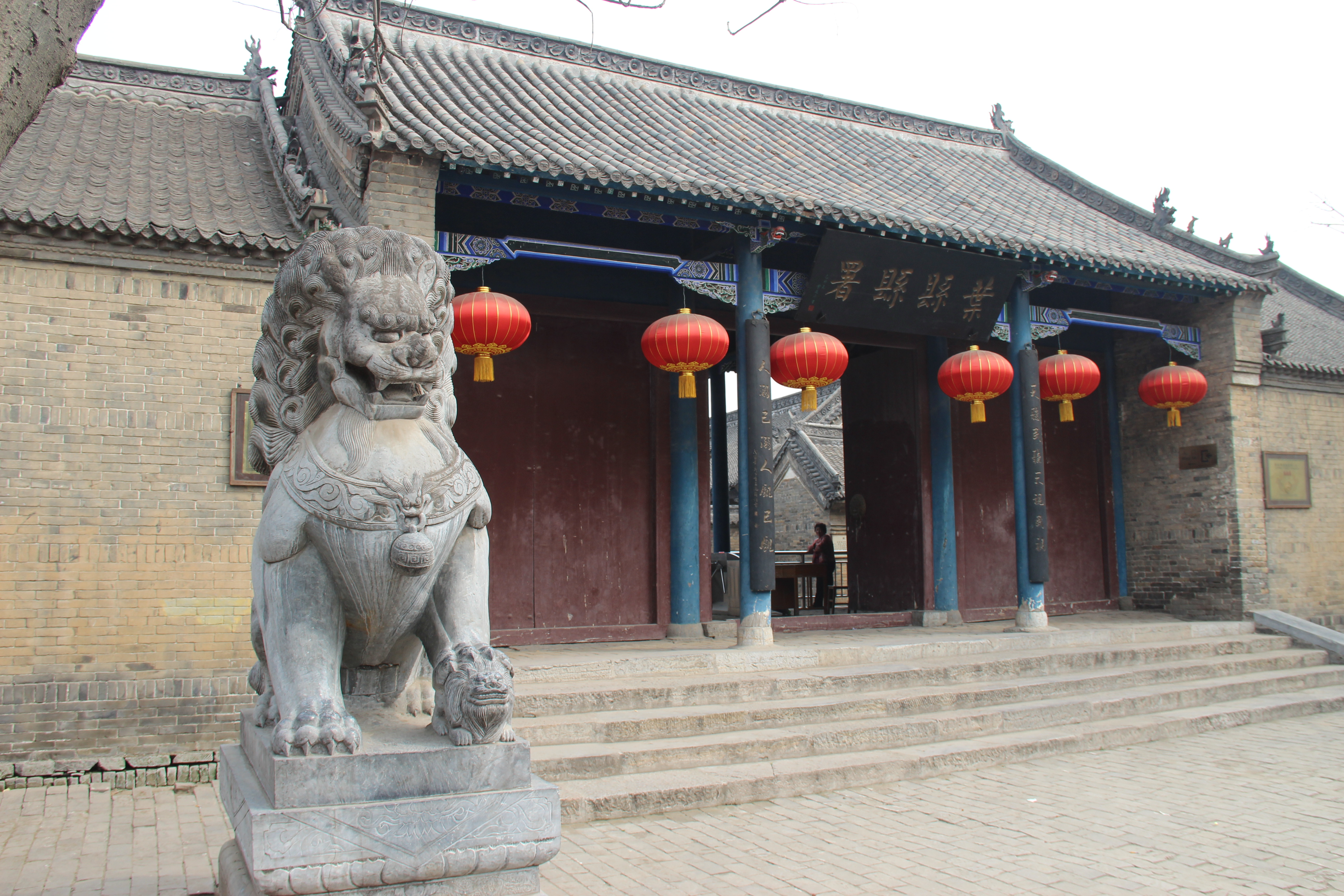
- Ye County Yamen

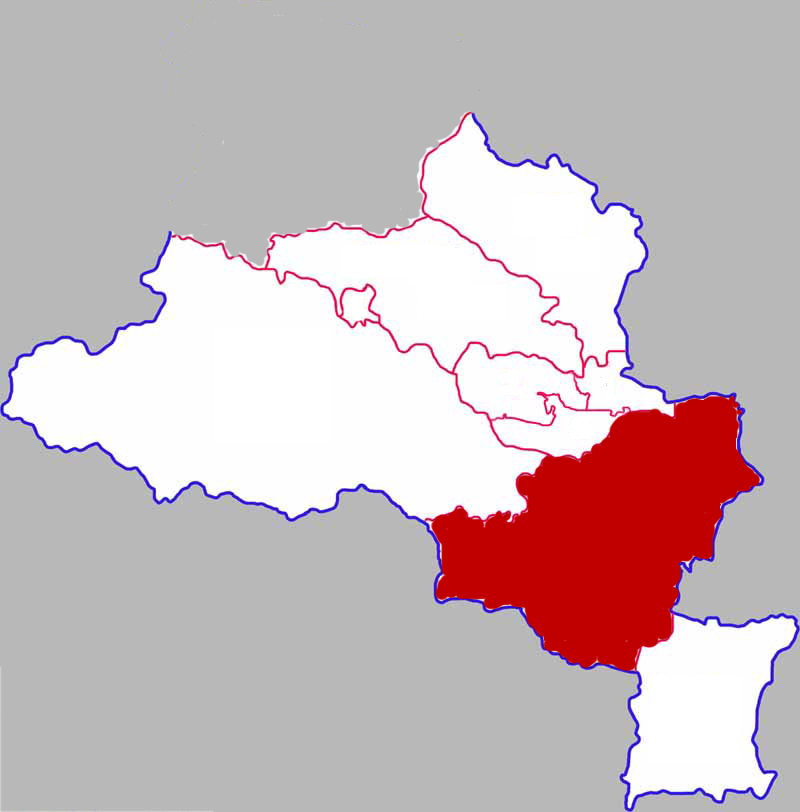
- Location in Pingdingshan

- Location of the seat in Henan
- Coordinates: 33°37′37″N 113°21′25″E
- Country: People's Republic of China
- Province: Henan
- Prefecture-level city: Pingdingshan

Area
  - Total: 1,387 km^{2} (536 sq mi)

Population (2019)
  - Total: 756,700
  - Density: 545.6/km^{2} (1,413/sq mi)
- Time zone: UTC+8 (China Standard)
- Postal code: 467200

Ye County or Yexian (simplified Chinese: 叶县; traditional Chinese: 葉縣; pinyin: Yè Xiàn) is a county under the administration of the prefecture-level city of Pingdingshan, Henan province, China, with a population of 820,000.

The ancient town of Kunyang was located in Ye County. It was the site of the critical Battle of Kunyang, in which the Han forces decisively defeated the army of Wang Mang's Xin dynasty. The ancient city of Ye was the origin of the common Chinese surname Ye (叶/葉).

== Administrative divisions ==
As of 2012, this county is divided to 5 towns, 12 townships and 1 ethnic townships.

Towns

- Kunyang (昆阳镇)
- Rendian (任店镇)
- Bao'an (保安镇)
- Xiantai (仙台镇)
- Zunhuadian (遵化店镇)

Townships

- Chengguan Township (城关乡)
- Xiali Township (夏李乡)
- Changcun Township (常村乡)
- Tianzhuang Township (田庄乡)
- Jiuxian Township (旧县乡)
- Xindian Township (辛店乡)
- Longquan Township (龙泉乡)
- Shuizhai Township (水寨乡)
- Liancun Township (廉村乡)
- Dengli Township (邓李乡)
- Gongdian Township (龚店乡)
- Hongzhuangyang Township (洪庄杨乡)

Ethnic townships

- Mazhuang Hui Township (马庄回族乡)

== Climate ==
Climate data for Yexian, elevation 98 m (322 ft), (1991–2020 normals, extremes 1981–present)
Month	Jan	Feb	Mar	Apr	May	Jun	Jul	Aug	Sep	Oct	Nov	Dec	Year
Record high °C (°F)	20.1 (68.2)	24.4 (75.9)	32.6 (90.7)	33.7 (92.7)	40.6 (105.1)	40.4 (104.7)	40.8 (105.4)	39.2 (102.6)	39.3 (102.7)	35.1 (95.2)	27.6 (81.7)	20.4 (68.7)	40.8 (105.4)
Mean daily maximum °C (°F)	6.6 (43.9)	10.2 (50.4)	15.5 (59.9)	21.9 (71.4)	27.6 (81.7)	32.0 (89.6)	32.2 (90.0)	30.6 (87.1)	27.1 (80.8)	22.1 (71.8)	14.9 (58.8)	8.7 (47.7)	20.8 (69.4)
Daily mean °C (°F)	1.3 (34.3)	4.3 (39.7)	9.6 (49.3)	15.8 (60.4)	21.4 (70.5)	26.1 (79.0)	27.4 (81.3)	25.9 (78.6)	21.5 (70.7)	16.2 (61.2)	9.3 (48.7)	3.4 (38.1)	15.2 (59.3)
Mean daily minimum °C (°F)	−3.0 (26.6)	−0.4 (31.3)	4.4 (39.9)	10.1 (50.2)	15.6 (60.1)	20.8 (69.4)	23.5 (74.3)	22.3 (72.1)	17.2 (63.0)	11.6 (52.9)	4.7 (40.5)	−0.9 (30.4)	10.5 (50.9)
Record low °C (°F)	−13.5 (7.7)	−14.7 (5.5)	−8.0 (17.6)	−2.9 (26.8)	2.6 (36.7)	11.7 (53.1)	16.8 (62.2)	12.6 (54.7)	7.8 (46.0)	−2.4 (27.7)	−8.1 (17.4)	−14.0 (6.8)	−14.7 (5.5)
Average precipitation mm (inches)	14.9 (0.59)	16.1 (0.63)	33.6 (1.32)	46.4 (1.83)	78.2 (3.08)	108.2 (4.26)	199.2 (7.84)	142.5 (5.61)	84.3 (3.32)	48.4 (1.91)	35.0 (1.38)	12.7 (0.50)	819.5 (32.27)
Average precipitation days (≥ 0.1 mm)	4.6	5.0	6.3	6.7	8.4	8.4	11.9	10.6	9.5	7.1	6.2	4.2	88.9
Average snowy days	3.9	3.0	1.3	0.1	0	0	0	0	0	0	1.0	2.6	11.9
Average relative humidity (%)	65	65	67	68	67	66	79	82	77	70	70	65	70
Mean monthly sunshine hours	114.9	121.9	159.4	186.0	196.6	182.4	177.5	168.1	144.2	139.6	131.6	123.4	1,845.6
Percentage possible sunshine	36	39	43	47	46	42	41	41	39	40	43	40	41
Source: China Meteorological Administration

== Religious persecution ==
Kunyang is home to China's No. 1 Prison of Women of Yunan where the Chinese Christians, Ju Dianghong and Liang Qin are serving sentences of 13 years and 10 years respectively for their Christian activities.
