= Edwin Leong =

Hong Kong billionaire businessman (born 1951/52)

Edwin Leong Siu-hung
- Born: 1951 or 1952 (age 74–75); Guangdong, China
- Education: University of British Columbia (BSc); University of Toronto (MSc)
- Occupations: Chairman, Tai Hung Fai Enterprise
- Children: 1
- Parent: Henry G. Leong

Edwin Leong Siu-hung (Chinese: 梁紹鴻; born 1951/1952) is a Hong Kong billionaire businessman. He is a property investor, and his main company is Tai Hung Fai Enterprise, which he founded in 1977.

As of March 2022, his net worth is estimated at US$4.4 billion.

== Early life ==
Leong is the sixth son of Henry G. Leong, who worked for Jardine Matheson, and was aged nine when his father died.

== Career ==
Leong founded Tai Hung Fai Enterprise in 1977 as a property investment company, specialising in retail properties and hotels. Privately held, it has grown rapidly to a portfolio that now includes hotels, serviced apartments, retail shops, residential buildings, office buildings and industrial buildings.

Leong has been the vice chairman of Po Leung Kuk charitable organisation.

== Personal life ==
He is married with one child and lives in Hong Kong.
