= Huang Shih Tsai =

- Born: June 1951 (age 74)
- Occupation: Property developer
- Title: Chairman, Great China International
- Spouse: Married
- Children: 2

Huang Shih Tsai (born June 1951) is a Hong Kong billionaire property developer, who is chairman of Great China International, a privately held investment company.

As of April 2022, Forbes estimates his net worth at US$1.2 billion.

He is married, with two children, and lives in Shenzhen, China.
