= Hong Leong Group =

Malaysian conglomerate

Hong Leong Company (Malaysia) Berhad

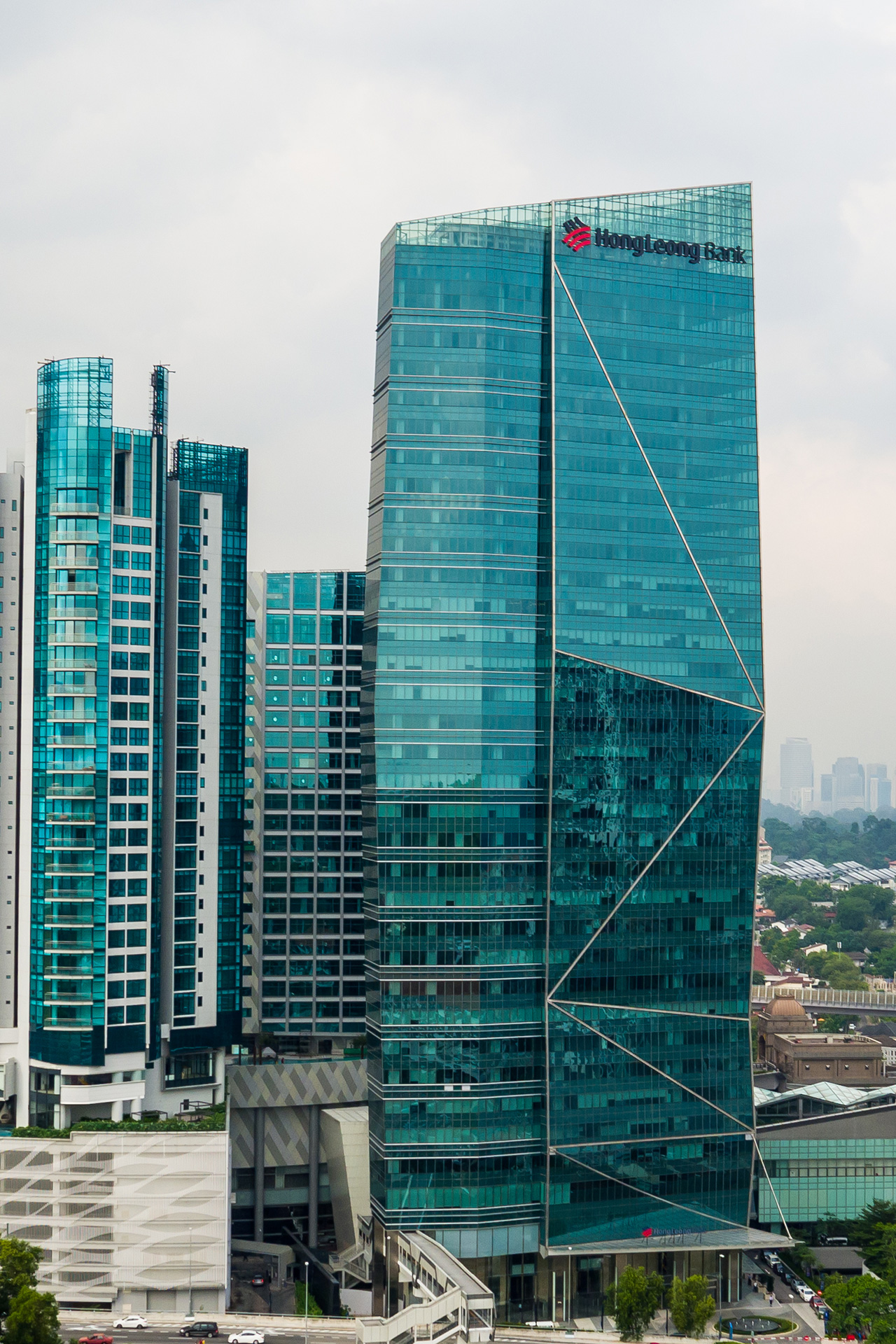
- Hong Leong Group's headquarters in Kuala Lumpur, Malaysia.
- Trade name: Hong Leong Group
- Industry: Conglomerate
- Founded: 1963
- Headquarters: Level 30, Menara Hong Leong, No. 6 Jalan Damanlela, Bukit Damansara, 50490 Kuala Lumpur, Malaysia
- Areas served: Malaysia, Singapore, Vietnam, Hong Kong, Cambodia and China
- Key people: Quek Leng Chan (Chairman, Co-founder); Tan Kong Khoon (CEO)
- Subsidiaries: Hong Leong Financial Group; Hong Leong Manufacturing Group; Guoco Group Limited
- Website: hongleong.com

Hong Leong Group is a prominent family-owned conglomerate under the Quek/Kwek family, with a strong presence in both Singapore and Malaysia.

While the group shares a common heritage, it operates as two separate entities: Hong Leong Group Malaysia, chaired by Quek Leng Chan, and Hong Leong Group Singapore, chaired by Kwek Leng Beng.

== History ==
Hong Leong Group, founded by Kwek Hong Png in 1941 in Singapore, began after he saved $7,000 in starting capital over a decade by working hard in his brother-in-law's hardware shop.

With this savings, he decided to set up his own company and named the business "Hong Leong": "Hong" means big, good, and plentiful, while "Leong" means great prosperity. Together, "Hong Leong" connoted a good harvest.

Kwek Hong Png started the business in a red, two-storey shophouse along Beach Road as a general trading firm dealing in ropes, paints, and supplies for ships and rubber estates.

Kwek Hong Png knew that expanding his business would require increasing his staff, so he invited his brothers Kwek Hong Khai, Kwek Hong Lye, and Kwek Hong Leong to join his firm. He gave them a 65 percent stake in the company, retaining 35 percent for himself.

In the 1950s and 1960s, in line with the Singapore government's industrialization goals, Hong Leong began manufacturing superior products such as cement through joint ventures with Onoda Cement and Mitsui & Co., via Singapore Cement Manufacturing Company.

This also led to new opportunities amidst a developing Singapore, including acquiring land and expanding into consumer financing.

During this period, Hong Leong also entered the Malaysian market, first establishing Tasek Cement Berhad, followed by setting up a Hong Leong Malaysia branch to expand its real estate and banking activities.

== Hong Leong Group Malaysia ==
Hong Leong Company (Malaysia) Berhad, more commonly known as Hong Leong Group Malaysia, is a conglomerate based in Malaysia. Founded as a trading company in 1963 by Quek Leng Chan and Kwek Hong Png, the company controls 14 listed companies involved in the financial services, manufacturing, distribution, property and infrastructure development. The group's shares are listed on stock exchanges of Malaysia, Singapore, Hong Kong, and Europe.

=== Finance/Banking ===
- Hong Leong Financial Group is the holding company for Hong Leong Group's banking and financial services.
- Hong Leong Bank
- Hong Leong Capital
- Hong Leong Assurance

=== Manufacturing ===
- Hong Leong Industries Berhad
- Malaysian Pacific Industries Berhad
- Southern Steel Berhad
- Hume Industries Berhad

=== Property development ===
- Guoco Group
- Guoco Leisure Ltd - the holding company (listed on Singapore Exchange) of an international hospitality and leisure group, operating through a subsidiary GLH Hotels Limited headquartered in London, UK.

== Hong Leong Group Singapore ==
=== Property development ===
- City Developments Limited
- Hong Leong Asia Limited
- Privately held Hong Leong Holdings Limited

=== Finance ===
- Hong Leong Finance Limited

== See also ==
- Dao Heng Bank
- Overseas Trust Bank
- DBS Bank (Hong Kong)
