= Quek Leng Chan =

Malaysian billionaire and businessman

Yang Berbahagia Tan Sri Quek Leng Chan PSM JSM KMN
- 郭令灿
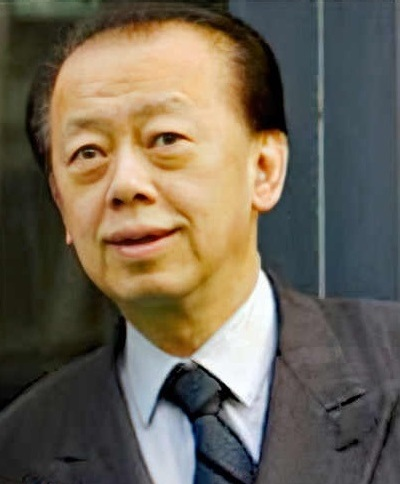
- Born: 12 August 1943 (age 83); Singapore, Straits Settlement
- Occupation: Businessman
- Known for: Co-Founder of Hong Leong Group
- Title: Executive chairman and executive officer of Hong Leong Group
- Spouse: Yap Suan Leng
- Children: 3

Tan Sri Quek Leng Chan (Note: simplified Chinese: 郭令灿; traditional Chinese: 郭令燦; Pe̍h-ōe-jī: Koeh Lēng-chhàn; pinyin: Guō Lìngcàn; Jyutping: Gwok3 Ling4 Caan3) (born December 8, 1941) is a Malaysian tycoon who co-founded Hong Leong Group Malaysia. In 2018, Quek Leng Chan ranked #217 on the Forbes World's Billionaires list, with wealth listed at US$7.2 billion. As of February 16, 2021, Tan Sri Quek's net worth is listed at US$9.9 billion and ranked 147th on Forbes.

== Early life and education ==
Quek Leng Chan studied at Victoria School in Singapore and is qualified as a barrister-at-law from Middle Temple, United Kingdom.

== Career ==
Quek has extensive business experience in various sectors, including financial services, manufacturing and real estate. He is the chairman and chief executive officer of Hong Leong Company (Malaysia) Berhad ("HLCM"), executive chairman of Hong Leong Industries Berhad ("HLI"), Hume Industries (Malaysia) Berhad ("HIMB"), Hong Leong Financial Group Berhad, GuocoLand (Malaysia) Berhad, Camerlin Group Berhad and chairman of Hong Leong Bank Berhad, HLG Capital Berhad ("HLG"), Hong Leong Assurance Berhad, Hong Leong Islamic Bank Berhad and Hong Leong Foundation ("HLF").

Quek oversees the Malaysian operations of the Hong Leong Group, while his cousin Kwek Leng Beng oversees the Singapore operations.

In September 2022, he was appointed chairman of the board of the real estate company GuocoLand Ltd.

== Honours ==
- Malaysia
  - Officer of the Order of the Defender of the Realm (KMN) (1976)
  - Companion of the Order of Loyalty to the Crown of Malaysia (JSM) (1991)
  - Commander of the Order of Loyalty to the Crown of Malaysia (PSM) – Tan Sri (1994)

== Family ==
Son: Justus Quek
