= Geoffrey Yeh =

Geoffrey Yeh Meou-tsen (Chinese: 葉謀遵; pinyin: Yè Móuzūn; Sidney Lau: Yip^{6}Mau^{4}Jun^{1}; 17 April 1931 – 16 October 2016) was a Hong Kong–based businessman who served as Chairman of the Hsin Chong Construction Group Ltd.

== Education and career ==
Yeh obtained a BSc degree in Civil Engineering from the University of Illinois in 1953 and subsequently an MSc degree from the Graduate School of Arts & Sciences of Harvard University in 1954.

Yeh served as Chair of the Hong Kong Futures Exchange Limited, until its merger into the Hong Kong Exchanges and Clearing Limited. Furthermore, he was Independent Non Executive Director of Hysan Development Co. Ltd. between 1979 and 2001 and as Independent Non-executive Director of China Travel International Investment Hong Kong Ltd. from January 2001 to July 15, 2007. Yeh was Chairman of the Hsin Chong Construction Group Ltd., founded by Godfrey Yeh, the family patriarch.

== Family ==
Yeh was married to Helen; they had a son, V-nee, and a daughter, Yvette. V-nee and his wife, Mira Yeh, a socialite, had a daughter, Nadya.

== Legacy ==
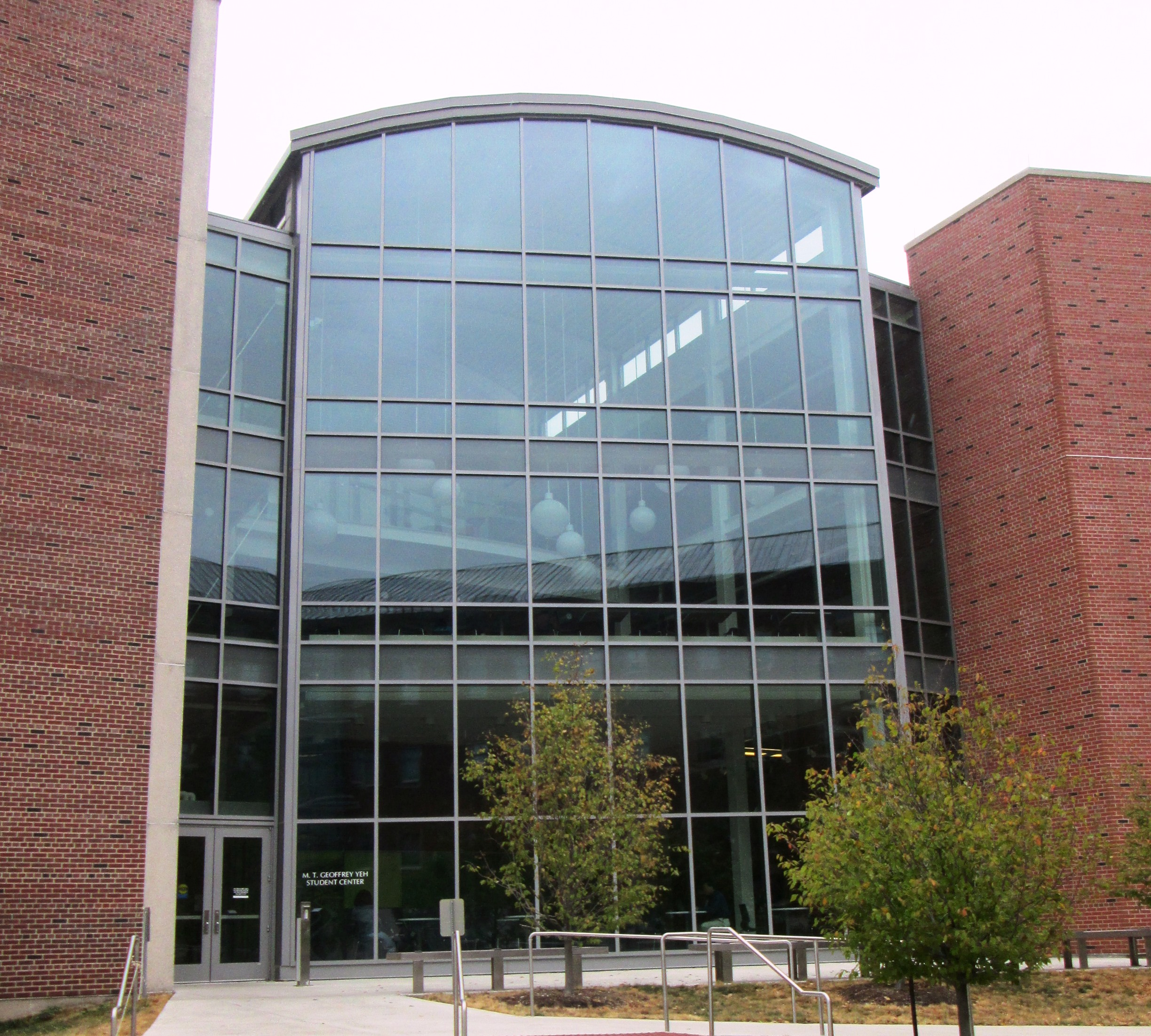
M. T. Geoffrey Yeh Student Center at the University of Illinois at Urbana-Champaign

- M.T. Geoffrey Yeh Student Center, Newmark Laboratory, University of Illinois at Urbana-Champaign, Department of Civil and Environmental Engineering
- In 2012, Yeh was inducted into the Engineering at Illinois Hall of Fame.
