= Hong Leong Capital =

Malaysian company

Hong Leong Capital Berhad

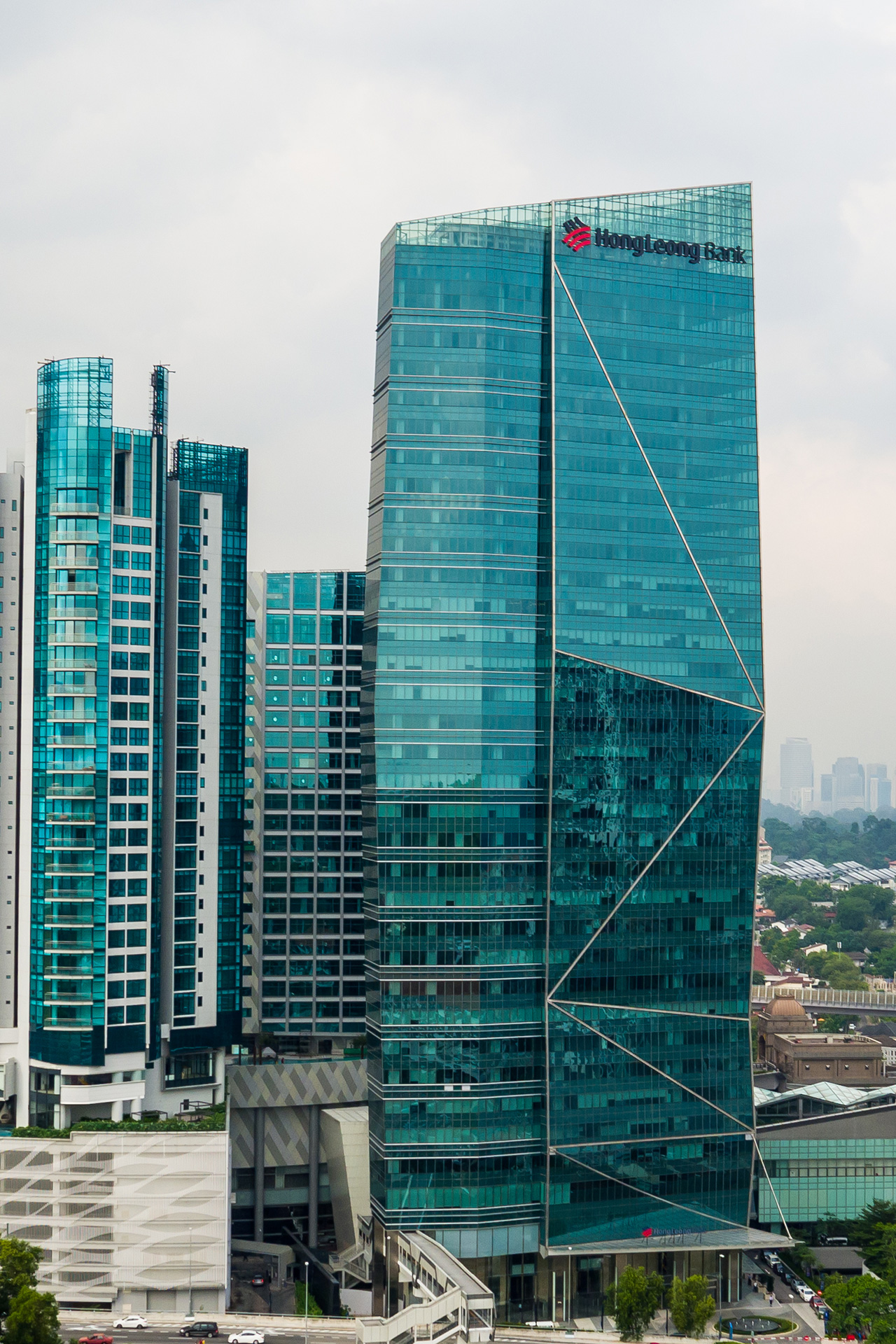
- Menara Hong Leong, Hong Leong Capital's headquarters in Kuala Lumpur, Malaysia.
- Formerly: Zalik Berhad (1991-1995); HLG Capital Berhad (1995-2010)
- Company type: Public limited company
- Traded as: MYX: 5274
- ISIN: MYL5274OO005
- Founded: 25 February 1991
- Headquarters: Level 30, Menara Hong Leong, No. 6, Jalan Damanlela, Bukit Damansara, 50490 Kuala Lumpur, Malaysia
- Area served: Malaysia
- Key people: Tan Kong Khoon (Chairman)
- Revenue: ▼MYR 223 million (2022); MYR 316 million (2021)
- Operating income: ▼MYR 97 million (2022); MYR 177 million (2021)
- Net income: ▼MYR 72 million (2022); MYR 203 million (2021)
- Total assets: ▲MYR 4.27 billion (2022); MYR 4.23 billion (2021)
- Total equity: ▲MYR 628 million (2022); MYR 515 million (2021)
- Parent: Hong Leong Financial Group
- Subsidiaries: Hong Leong Investment Bank Berhad; Hong Leong Asset Management Berhad
- Website: hlcap.com.my

Hong Leong Capital Berhad (MYX: 5274) is an investment holding company listed on the Bursa Malaysia whereby its subsidiaries are involved in stock and share broking, acting as agent and nominee for clients, corporate advisory services, fund management, unit trusts, share financing, futures and options broking. It is part of the Hong Leong Group conglomerate.

== History ==
=== Privatization attempt ===
In January 2013, Hong Leong Capital's parent Hong Leong Financial Group attempted to privatize its investment banking arm for RM1.71 per share. However, the deal fell through by February 2013 as minority shareholders were not satisfied with the offer.
