= Gongniu =

Chinese electrical products manufacturer

Gongniu Group Co., Ltd.
- Native name: 公牛集团股份有限公司
- Type: Public
- Traded as: SSE: 603195
- Founded: 1995; 31 years ago
- Founders: Ruan Liping ＆ Ruan Xueping
- Headquarters: Cixi, Zhejiang
- Subsidiaries: Goneo
- Website: www.gongniu.cn

Gongniu Group (simplified Chinese: 公牛集团; traditional Chinese: 公牛集團; SSE: 603195; officially Gongniu Group Co., Ltd. or Bull Group Co., Ltd.), also known as Bull Group, is a Chinese civil electrical products manufacturing company co-founded by Ruan Liping and Ruan Xueping in 1995.

Headquartered in Cixi, Zhejiang, Gongniu Group's shares began to be publicly traded on the Shanghai Stock Exchange in February 2020.

Gongniu Group had long been regarded as a family-owned and managed company before it went public. Prior to 2017, the Ruan brothers held 100% of the company's equity as its sole shareholder.

== History ==
Gongniu Group Co., Ltd., internationally known under the BULL brand, is a Chinese manufacturer of electrical products founded in 1995 by brothers Ruan Liping and Ruan Xueping in Cixi, Zhejiang Province, China. The company began as a producer of power strips and extension sockets, focusing on safety, reliability, and durability. At a time when product quality varied significantly across the market, Bull differentiated itself by offering products designed to provide safer and longer-lasting electrical connections.

During the late 1990s, Bull experienced rapid growth. The company formally registered its trademark in 1997 and invested heavily in product development and quality control. By emphasizing safety standards and manufacturing consistency, Bull established a strong reputation among both household and commercial users throughout China.

In the 2000s, Bull expanded its production capacity and distribution network, transforming from a regional manufacturer into a nationally recognized brand. In 2007, the company entered the wall switch and socket market, broadening its product portfolio beyond power strips. Continued investment in manufacturing, research, and distribution helped Bull strengthen its position in China’s electrical accessories industry.

The 2010s marked a period of diversification. In addition to sockets and switches, Bull introduced new product categories including LED lighting, USB charging solutions, power accessories, and other electrical products for residential and commercial applications. The company continued to focus on product innovation, launching features such as enhanced surge protection, child-safety mechanisms, and upgraded electrical safety technologies.

In 2017, Bull initiated a corporate restructuring process in preparation for a public listing. The company was converted into a joint-stock corporation and completed its initial public offering on the Shanghai Stock Exchange on February 6, 2020. The listing represented a major milestone in the company’s development and further strengthened its financial position for future expansion.

Following its IPO, Bull accelerated its investments in emerging sectors, including smart home technologies, intelligent lighting systems, electric vehicle charging solutions, and advanced electrical infrastructure products. The company also expanded its research and development capabilities while increasing its focus on international markets. In 2023, Bull established a dedicated international business division to support its global growth strategy.

Bull Group manufacturers electrical and smart-home products. Its portfolio includes power strips, wall switches and sockets, lighting systems, charging products, smart-home solutions, and EV charging equipment.
