= Hsin Chong =

Company of Hong Kong

- Industry: Construction; Property development; Real estate
- Founded: 1939; 87 years ago in Hong Kong
- Founders: Godfrey Yeh Kan-Nee and Chien Chu-Keng
- Defunct: January 2020
- Headquarters: Hong Kong
- Website: hsinchong.com

Hsin Chong Group Holdings Limited (新昌營造集團有限公司; SEHK: 404) or simply Hsin Chong (新昌) was a major construction company in Hong Kong.

== History ==
It was established in 1939 in Hong Kong as Hsin Chong & Company by Godfrey Yeh Kan-Nee and Chien Chu-Keng.

Yeh was a well-established builder in Shanghai before moving to Hong Kong in 1937. His son Geoffrey Yeh Meou-Tsen worked with him from 1955.

Chu-Keng's son Philip worked briefly at Hsin Chong before starting his own firm.

The company was listed on the Hong Kong Stock Exchange in 1991.

In the late 1990s, Hsin Chong was involved in a scandal over short-piling. As a result, the company was banned from bidding for government contracts between 1999 and 2002.

== Recent developments ==
Chinese billionaire Lin Zhuo Yan has taken over control of the company from the Yeh family. In recent years, the company has diversified into mainland China property development. In May 2014, Hsin Chong Construction Limited agreed to pay HK$10.625 billion for properties in Sanshui city.

Anonymous Analytics reported in September 2016 that Lin uses Hsin Chong as a "personal dumping ground" for loss-making development properties. Hsin Chong has also been accused of acquiring properties at inflated prices. The company's Hong Kong business was profitable, but the firm recorded a loss of HK$2.7 billion in 2016 due largely to a HK$4.4 billion loss on mainland property investments. Its shares suspended trading in April 2017. In early 2017 it was reported that the company owed HK$500 million to subcontractors in Hong Kong, and the situation had led to delays at various construction projects including the M+ Museum.

Hsin Chong's HK$5.9 billion contract with the Hong Kong Government's West Kowloon Cultural District Authority (WKCDA) for construction of the M+ Museum was terminated on 17 August 2018 on grounds of Hsin Chong's insolvency and poor performance causing "significant delays", though the allegations were denied by Hsin Chong management.
