= Chemical metallurgy =

Branch of chemical science

Chemical metallurgy is the science of obtaining metals from their concentrates, semi products, recycled bodies and solutions, and of considering reactions of metals with an approach of disciplines belonging to chemistry. As such, it involves reactivity of metals and it is especially concerned with the reduction and oxidation, and the chemical performance of metals.

Subjects of study in chemical metallurgy include the extraction of metals, thermodynamics, electrochemistry, and chemical degradation (corrosion).

== See also ==
- Metallurgy
- Physical metallurgy
- Extractive metallurgy
