= Cheah Cheng Hye =

Hong Kong businessman

Chinese name
- Traditional Chinese: 謝清海
- Jyutping: Ze6 Cing1 Hoi2
- Hokkien POJ: Chiā Chheng-hái
- Tâi-lô: Tsiā Tshing-hái

Cheah Cheng Hye (born 1954) is a Malaysian investor who co-founded the Hong Kong asset-management company Value Partners in 1993 and helped take it public in 2007. He stepped down as co-chairman in January 2025 and became the company's honorary chairman.

In 2008, FinanceAsia named Cheah its Capital Markets Person of the Year.

== Early life and education ==
Born into an ethnic Chinese family in Penang, Malaysia, in 1954, Cheah attended the Penang Free School. Leaving school with a high school diploma in 1971, he joined The Star newspaper as a reporter, subeditor and editorial writer. In 1974, he travelled from Malaysia to Hong Kong and later became a financial journalist with the Hong Kong Standard, the Asian Wall Street Journal and the Far Eastern Economic Review.^{[1]} In 1989, Cheah became head of research and proprietary trader in Hong Kong for Morgan Grenfell & Co, a UK merchant bank.

== Career ==
In 1993, Cheah and V-Nee Yeh co-founded Value Partners and started its first investment fund, Value Partners Classic Fund. From inception, Cheah was in charge of Value Partners, heading Value Partners' asset management and business operations. In 2007, Cheah and chief executive officer Franco Ngan led Value Partners to become Hong Kong's first listed asset management company on the Hong Kong Stock Exchange (Stock code: 806 HK). Value Partners and Dato' Seri Cheah personally have received a total of more than 280 professional awards and prizes during the period 1993 to 2024.

From 1993 to 2002, Cheah served on the Board of Directors as an Independent Non-Executive Director of Hong Kong-listed JCG Holdings, a leading microfinance company and subsidiary of Public Bank Malaysia, renamed from 2006 as Public Financial Holdings. From 2017 to 2026, he served as an Independent Non-Executive Director (INED) on the Board of Directors of Hong Kong Exchanges and Clearing Ltd. He also chaired the group's Investment Committee.

Dato’ Seri Cheah retired from Value Partners in January 2025, remaining a substantial shareholder and retaining his board seat with the title of Honorary Chairman. Since then, Dato’ Seri Cheah has managed Cheah Capital Ltd., a single-family office in Hong Kong and Singapore which he set up to invest his personal assets.

== Proponent of value investing ==
Dato’ Seri Cheah is a proponent of value investing. While he has been influenced by the value investing principles developed by Columbia Business School professors Benjamin Graham and David Dodd in Security Analysis, he adapted the philosophy for Asian markets.^{[1]} In 2010, he was invited by the Heilbrunn Center for Graham and Dodd Investing of the Columbia Business School to give a keynote speech, titled "Value-investing: Making it work in China and Asia", at the prestigious annual Graham & Dodd Breakfast.^{[1]}

Performance record (in Value Partners until retirement)

Note: Value Partners' assets under management was US$5.1 billion as of 31 December 2024

Value Partners Classic Fund (Fund Size USD 824 million as of 31 December 2024)

- +3,588% (net) from inception on 1 April 1993 to 2 January 2025
- Hang Seng Index +722% over the same period
- Annualized return: +12% (net) compared to Hang Seng Index annualized return of +6.9%

The fund was created and managed during its first decade by Dato’ Seri Cheah and subsequently by the Value Partners Investment Team (Co-Chief Investment Officers: Dato’ Seri Cheah and Louis So; Senior Managers: Renee Hung and others).

Source: Value Partners Classic Fund factsheet as of 31 December 2024. HSBC was the trustee and custodian of the Fund.

Value Partners High-Dividend Stocks Fund (Fund Size USD 1,367 million as of 31 December 2024)

- +953% (net) from inception on 2 September 2002 to 2 January 2025
- MSCI AC Asia ex-Japan Index +534% over the same period
- Annualized return: +11.1% (net) compared to MSCI AC Asia ex-Japan Index annualized return of +8.6%

The fund was created and managed during the first several years by Dato’ Seri Cheah and subsequently by the Value Partners Investment Team (Co-Chief Investment Officers: Dato’ Seri Cheah and Louis So; Senior Managers: Norman Ho and others).

Source: Value Partners High-Dividend Stocks Fund factsheet as of 31 December 2024. HSBC was the trustee and custodian of the Fund.

Value Gold ETF (Fund Size HKD 2.6 billion as of 31 December 2024)

- +85.5% (net) from inception on 3 November 2010 to 2 January 2025
- Annualized return: +4.5% (net)

The ETF, listed in Hong Kong, was created by Dato’ Seri Cheah and is 100% backed by physical gold stored in Hong Kong. Performance closely tracks the international gold price.

Source: Value Gold ETF factsheet as of 31 December 2024. HSBC was the trustee and custodian of the Fund.

== Cheah Capital: Continuing as a full-time investor ==
After retiring from Value Partners in 2025, Dato’ Seri Cheah continues to actively manage assets including stocks, bonds, funds, private equity and real estate through Cheah Capital Limited, based in Hong Kong, Singapore and Malaysia.

Cheah Capital is a single-family office with 12 staff set up for the Cheah family. While its focus is on asset management, it is also active in philanthropy, particularly in East and Southeast Asia.

The Cheah Capital Investment Team is led by Dato' Seri Cheah, as Chief Investment Officer, and includes an Investment Director, Mr. Feng Xin, and some assistants. While some assets are allocated to external managers, the team manages a significant in-house, multi-asset portfolio, implementing a value-investing discipline, based on fundamental research, vigorous selection and long-term investing.

The Hong Kong Economic Journal reported on 7 November 2025 that Cheah invested heavily in gold over 17 years and made a profit of HK$1.52 billion (US$194 million).

According to the paper, which is Hong Kong’s leading business daily, Cheah consistently followed a long-term strategy to accumulate gold, holding only physical gold and avoiding the use of leverage or derivatives. His gain of HK$1.52 billion represented a profit of 144.7%, the paper said, and it noted that in a 2020 interview with the paper, Cheah had strongly recommended gold to the public when the price was US$1,700 per ounce.

In early 2026, a Bloomberg article reported that Cheah made a gain of USD 251.1 million, or 167%, on his personal investment in gold.

The report, dated 19 January 2026, noted that Cheah started with small purchases of gold from 2008 and started buying heavily from 2015.

Bloomberg stated that Cheah recommended a model portfolio composed of 60% equities, 20% bonds and 20% precious metals led by gold.

== Recognition ==
- 2023: “Lifetime Achievement Award” by Asia Asset Management
- 2021: Named by Asia Asset Management as one of the Top 25 Leaders over the past 25 years in Asia's asset management industry.
- 2018: Value Partners Group was named on Forbes Asia's "Best Under A Billion". Dato’ Seri Cheah talks about how he has grown his business to become one of the region's top-performing public companies.
- 2018: Received the "Outstanding figure of Hong Kong Stock Connect" award from mainland China's Securities Times 证券时报, a leading financial and securities newspaper ran by the People's Daily.
- 2017: Appointed as an Independent Non-executive Director of Hong Kong Exchanges and Clearing Limited.^{[1]}
- 2016: Conferred Darjah Gemilang Pangkuan Negeri (DGPN) that carries the title “Dato’ Seri" by the government of Penang, Malaysia.^{[2]}
- 2015: Appointed as a member of the Financial Services Development Council.^{[3]}
- 2013: Conferred the Darjah Setia Pangkuan Negeri (DSPN) that carries the title "Dato’" by the government of Penang, Malaysia.^{[4]}
- 2013: Appointed as a member of the New Business Committee of the Financial Services Development Council.^{[5]}
- 2013: Received an Honorary Fellowship from the Hong Kong University of Science and Technology for his contribution to the university and society.^{[6]}
- 2011: Awarded "Best of the Best Region Awards – CIO of the Year in Asia" by Asia Asset Management.^{[7]}
- 2009-2010: Named in the top "25 Most Influential People in Asian Hedge Funds" by AsianInvestors.^{[8]}
- 2007: Named by FinanceAsia as “Capital Markets Person of the Year”.
- 2003: Voted “Most Astute Investor” in Asian Benchmark Survey.

Dato’ Seri Cheah has been given nicknames by the Hong Kong media including "Goldfinger" (金手指)^{[9]} and "the Warren Buffett of Asia" (亞洲畢菲特).^{[10]}

== Public services ==
Dato’ Seri Cheah is a member of the Hong Kong University of Science and Technology Business School Advisory Council, a member of the Hong Kong Trade Development Council (HKTDC) Belt and Road & Greater Bay Area Committee, a member of the HKTDC Mainland Business Advisory Committee, an Honorary Fellow of the Hong Kong Management Association, a Fellow of the Hong Kong Institute of Directors and a member of the Hong Kong Academy of Finance.

In 2025, Dato’ Seri Cheah became a Governor and Patron of Our Hong Kong Foundation. He is also a Founding Member and a past Co-Chairman of the Malaysian Chamber of Commerce (Hong Kong and Macau). He is also on the Advisory Council of the Hong Kong-ASEAN Foundation. For a number of years, Dato’ Seri Cheah has served as an Honorary Advisor for the annual Asian Financial Forum held in Hong Kong.
