= Ye Chenghai =

Chinese businessman and former politician

- 叶澄海
- Born: August 15, 1943 (age 83); Meixian District, Meizhou, Guangdong, China
- Education: Renmin University of China
- Occupations: Businessman; former politician
- Known for: Founder and former chairman of Shenzhen Salubris Pharmaceuticals
- Spouse: Liao Qingqing
- Children: Ye Yuxiang

Ye Chenghai (Chinese: 葉澄海; born 15 August 1943) is a Chinese businessman and former politician, best known as the founder and former chairman of Shenzhen Salubris Pharmaceuticals Co., Ltd. (Chinese: 深圳信立泰药业股份有限公司). He is a Hakka born in Meizhou, Guangdong. He served as Vice Mayor of Shenzhen before quitting politics and entering business.

As of May 2015, his net worth is estimated at US$4.2 billion.

== Early life and political career ==
Ye was born in Meixian (now Meixian District of Meizhou), Guangdong, and studied international politics at Renmin University of China. After graduating in 1968, he was assigned to Bao'an County (the predecessor of Shenzhen) and later held positions in Shenzhen, including serving as a member of the municipal party standing committee, party secretary of Luohu District, and vice mayor of Shenzhen.

He resigned from government in 1985 and entered business.

== Business career ==
Following his resignation from government, Ye founded and held positions at companies including Hong Kong-based Meizhou International Trade (Chinese: 美洲国际贸易有限公司) and Shenzhen Haibin Pharmaceutical (Chinese: 深圳海滨制药有限公司).

In 1998, a Hong Kong-controlled Salubris entity (Chinese: 信立泰药业有限公司) formed Shenzhen Salubris Pharmaceuticals (then a limited company), which was reorganized into a joint-stock company in 2007; Ye served as chairman for many years and was also identified as an actual controller of the listed company via the Hong Kong Salubris entity.

In September 2022, Ye resigned as chairman and continued as a director, with the company appointing his son Ye Yuxiang (Kevin Sing Ye) as chairman.

== Philanthropy and other roles ==
Ye has served as a vice chairman of Renmin University of China's board. In April 2024, Renmin University of China announced the establishment of the Chenghai Institute for Global Development and Security (Chinese: 澄海全球发展与安全高等研究院), funded by Ye's donation.
