= Solace Asia =

- Solace Addiction Treatment Services
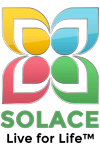

Geography
- Location: Kuala Lumpur, Malaysia

Organisation
- Type: Specialist

Services
- Beds: 50
- Speciality: Drug rehabilitation

History
- Founded: 2014

Links
- Website: www.solaceasia.org
- Lists: Hospitals in Malaysia

Solace Asia is a Malaysian-based drug and alcohol rehab and was the first of its type to be established in Malaysia. The drug rehabilitation facility is headquartered in Kuala Lumpur and Selangor.

== Background ==
Malaysian media in recent times has discussed the possibility of the government promoting medical tourism in the region. One area of medical tourism that the country had little coverage was drug therapy and drug rehabilitation. After a gap in the market, Solace Asia was launched as a 50-room treatment facility in Sabah, Malaysia. After its launch, it was stated that the treatment facility would offer "treatment for chemical addictions such as drugs and behavioural ones such as gambling besides depression and stress". The patients include high-profile individuals battling addiction from Southeast Asia, including countries like Singapore. Originally headquartered in Kota Kinabalu, to cater to the increasing demand for addiction rehab services in peninsular Malaysia, in October 2019 the organization relocated its facility to Kuala Lumpur and rebranded itself under the new name of Solace Asia from Solace Sabah.

== Treatment ==
The facility focuses predominantly on drug addiction. Statistics produced by the treatment facility received coverage in the Malaysian media when they stated that out of every ten people who took recreational drugs, three of them would require treatment for it at some point in their lives. The comments came during a speech at Universiti Malaysia Sabah. During the same speech, they also spoke about how impressionable teenagers were when taking drugs.

In August 2015, an additional clinic opened in Mont Kiara, Kuala Lumpur. The facility would run in parallel with the existing facilities in Kuala Lumpur, catering for people with drug and alcohol problems. The treatments provided would include assessments for addiction and co-occurring disorders such as depression and attention deficit hyperactivity disorder.

It was stated during an interview that the treatments were focused on offering a competitive price when compared to western drug rehabilitation facilities. This was partly due to the strategy for its foundation and the growth of medical tourism in Malaysia. Unlike many similar treatment facilities, Solace Asia stated that any treatment provided was a lifelong treatment, providing regular follow-ups. These follow-ups are often between once every one to three months.

== Conferences ==
Solace Asia had hosted the Fourth International Asia Pacific Behavioural and Addiction Medicine (APBAM) Conference at the Medicine and Health Science Faculty in Universiti Malaysia Sabah. State Community Development and Consumer Affairs Minister Datuk Jainab Ahmad stated that Sabah was 3rd in highest in Alcohol Consumption in Malaysia, with Kuala Lumpur and Sarawak being first and second. Solace Asia was an organising member at the conference.
