= UMSC =

UMSC may refer to:

- Uganda Muslim Supreme Council, an Islamic organization in Uganda
- Unionville Milliken SC, a semi-professional soccer club in Canada
- Universiti Malaya Specialist Centre, a hospital and medical center in Malaysia
