= Medical tourism in Malaysia =

According to the Malaysia Healthcare Travel Council (MHTC), Malaysia reportedly received 641,000 foreign patients in 2011, 728,800 in 2012, 881,000 in 2013, 882,000 in 2014, 859,000 in 2015, and 921,000 in 2016. Malaysia's medical tourism statistics derive from the reported numbers of all foreign patients treated by MHTC-endorsed medical facilities. These figures encompass all registered patients with a foreign passport, which by default also encompass expatriates, migrants, business travellers, and holiday-makers for whom health care may not be the main motive for their stay. The number of MHTC-endorsed medical facilities in Malaysia has increased over the years (e.g., 35 in 2009, 49 in 2011, 63 in 2012, 72 in 2013 and 78 in 2014), playing a role in increasing the official figures on foreign patients. Malaysia is listed in the top 10 tourism destinations in the world by Patients Beyond Borders.

== Origin of patients ==
The majority of the foreign patients seeking medical treatments in Malaysia are from Indonesia, with smaller numbers of foreign patients coming from India, Singapore, Japan, Australia, Europe, the USA and the Middle East. In 2008, Indonesians comprised 75% of all foreign patients receiving care in Malaysia; Europeans, 3%; Japanese, 3%; Singaporeans, 1% and citizens from Middle Eastern countries, 1%. By 2011, Indonesians comprised 57% of all foreign patients in Malaysia as the number of patients of other nationalities grew.

Health insurance companies in Singapore have recently permitted their policyholders to be treated in Malaysia where services are cheaper than in Singapore.

== Government measures ==
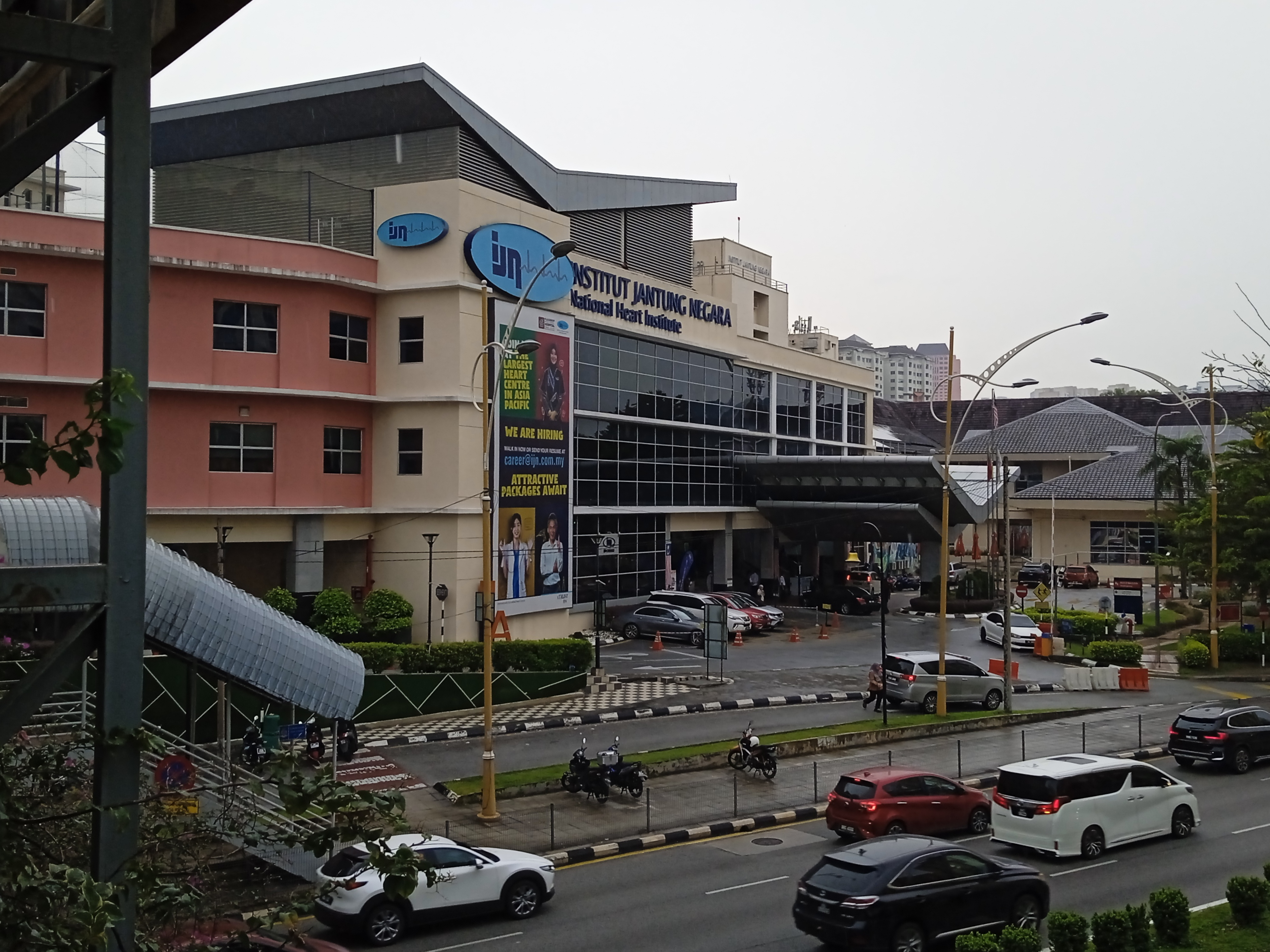
Institut Jantung Negara in Kuala Lumpur

As with Thailand, medical tourism started to receive attention from the Malaysian government in the wake of the Asian financial crisis as a tool for economic diversification in the healthcare and tourism industries. The National Committee for the Promotion of Medical and Health Tourism (NCPMHT) was formed by the Ministry of Health in January 1998. Following on this, private hospitals (and some corporatised government-owned hospitals, like the Institut Jantung Negara) – concentrated mainly in the states of Penang, Malacca, Selangor, Sarawak, and Johor – worked alongside and through their respective state governments; private hospital associations; and the Malaysian Ministries of Health, Tourism, and Trade and Industry to promote medical tourism. In 2009, the Ministry of Health set up the Malaysia Healthcare Travel Council (MHTC) to replace the NCPMHT and to serve as the primary agency to promote and develop the country's medical tourism industry as well as position Malaysia as a healthcare hub in the Southeast Asian/ASEAN region.

== Accreditation ==
The Malaysian government's investment tax allowance has encouraged private health care facilities promoting medical tourism to invest in internationally recognized accreditation schemes (e.g. Joint Commission International and Malaysian Society for Quality in Healthcare) and medical equipment in order to develop 'world-class', technology-intensive private health care facilities and ensure care standards considered necessary to attract medical tourists.

== Awards ==
As a nation, Malaysia and its non-governmental organizations, medical centres and facilitators have won numerous awards.

- Sunway Medical Centre:
  - IMTJ Awards - International Hospital of the Year 2017
  - IMTJ Awards - Best Marketing Initiative of the Year 2017
  - IMTJ Awards - Highly Commended Quality Initiative of the Year 2017
  - IMTJ Awards - International Hospital of the Year 2016
  - GHT Awards - Orthopaedic Service Provider of the Year 2017
  - GHT Awards - International Hospital of the Year 2016
  - GHT Awards - Cosmetic Surgery & Aesthetic Service Provider of the Year 2016
  - Frost & Sullivan Awards - Hospital of the Year 2016
- Prince Court Medical Centre:
  - MTQUA Awards - World's Top Ten Hospitals for Medical Tourist 2017
  - GHT Awards - Paediatric Service Provider of the Year 2016
  - IMTJ Awards - International Infertility Clinic of the Year 2014
  - MTQUA Awards - World's Top Ten Hospitals for Medical Tourist 2014
  - MHTC Awards - Highest Number of Healthcare Travellers 2012
  - ServCare Awards - Malaysia Service to Care Champion 2012
  - Frost & Sullivan Awards - Hospital of the Year 2010
  - BestBrands Awards - Best Brands Wellness Hospital of the Year 2010
- George Medical Getaway:
  - GHP Awards - Best Medical Tourism Facilitator 2018

== Revenue ==
Revenue from medical tourism to Malaysia grew from MYR 299 million in 2008 to MYR 527 million in 2011 to MYR 1.7 billion in 2019. Penang's hospitals were responsible for contributing 57% in 2009 and 66% in 2010 of all revenue to the country's medical tourism industry. With the 2010 launch of the Economic Transformation Programme (ETP), which seeks to transform Malaysia into an upper middle-income country with a knowledge-based economy, interest in medical tourism's economic potential grew. The ETP designated health care as one of the country's 12 National Key Economic Areas (NKEAs) deemed to have the potential to spur growth. As part of the health care NKEA, medical tourism is intended to generate MYR 9.6 billion in revenue and MYR 4.3 billion in gross national income and to require 5,300 more medical professionals by 2020. For-profit hospitals are expected to invest MYR 335 million in hospital infrastructure in order to be prepared for 1.9 million foreign patients annually by 2020.

Medical tourism in Malaysia was ranked by Nuwire as one of the top five destinations for health tourism in the world in 2008. Malaysia was also recognised as 2015 'Destination of the Year' by the International Medical Travel Journal (IMTJ).

== See also ==
- Tourism in Malaysia
- Healthcare in Malaysia
- List of hospitals in Malaysia
- Medical tourism
- Economic Transformation Programme
