= University of Malaya Medical Centre =

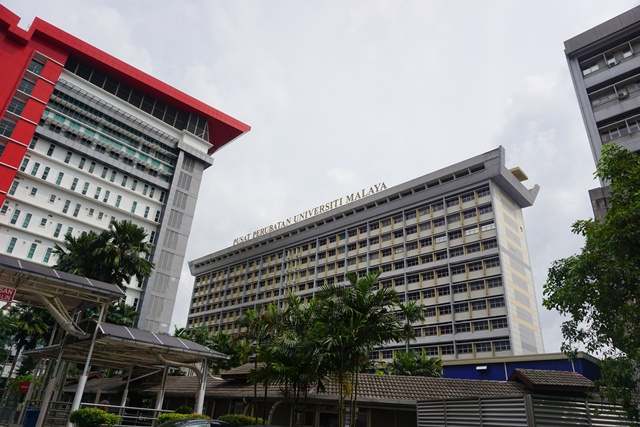

Geography
- Location: Jalan Universiti, Lembah Pantai, Kuala Lumpur, Malaysia
- Coordinates: 3.1137182°N 101.6529117°E

Organisation
- Type: Teaching
- Affiliated university: University of Malaya

Services
- Emergency department: Yes
- Beds: 1,617

History
- Founded: 1968

Links
- Website: www.ummc.edu.my
- Lists: Hospitals in Malaysia

The University of Malaya Medical Centre (UMMC) (Malay: Pusat Perubatan Universiti Malaya, abbr: PPUM), formerly known as University Hospital, is a government-funded teaching hospital and medical centre located in Pantai Dalam, in the southwest corner of Kuala Lumpur, Malaysia. It was established by statute in September 1962 and is part of University of Malaya (UM).

It serves as the teaching hospital for the Faculty of Medicine of UM, and is the largest and oldest teaching hospital in Malaysia. The UMMC is also the second largest hospital in Malaysia.

== History ==
Shortly after the end of the second World War, a commission was established under the Chairmanship of Sir Alexander Carr-Saunders to enquire into and make recommendations concerning university education in British Malaya. The Commission arrived in March 1947, and after an intensive study recommended that the King Edward VII College of Medicine and Raffles College be almagated forthwith to form the University of Malaya. Accordingly, the University of Malaya (UM) was established in Singapore on 8 October 1949 as a national institution to serve the higher educational needs of British Malaya.

In 1957, a Commission of Enquiry was set up by the governments of the Federation of Malaya and the Colony of Singapore at the request of UM to review the constitution, working and finances of the university in the light of the experience and rapid expansion of last seven years and of the prospective expansion in the near future, including the plan for developing the university in Kuala Lumpur, and to make recommendations. Arising from the commission's report and that of a Joint Constitutional Committee appointed by the two governments, legislation was passed in November 1958 providing for the continuance of UM as a single university, but with two largely autonomous divisions of equal status, one in each territory. This legislation came into effect in January 1958.

In 1960, the government of the Federation of Malaya indicated that the Kuala Lumpur Division of UM should become the national university of the Federation with effect from the beginning of the 1962/63 academic term. Likewise, the Singapore Government indicated that the Singapore Division should become the National University of Singapore (NUS). Steps to achieve the establishment of these two separate universities were finalised during the year 1961, and the present form of UM and NUS was established on 1 January 1962.

UM is situated on a site of about 750 acres of land in Lembah Pantai on the outskirts of Kuala Lumpur. Part of the university's borders form the Selangor-Kuala Lumpur state border.

== The University Hospital, a brief introduction ==
Although the main hospital building was completed by December 1966, commissioning of the hospital and opening of the wards proceeded slowly, mainly due to a shortage of nursing staff. The first patients were admitted in March 1967, and before the end of the year, several wards had been opened together with the Polyclinic and Accident and Emergency Unit, thus making the hospital available to residents in the area. While the hospital itself, like the rest of the university, is physically located in Kuala Lumpur, it is accessed from Petaling Jaya, Selangor; the state border runs literally along the road the hospital is on. Services began running on a 24-hour basis. By the end of 1969, all 758 beds were available for use. A new ward block of 112 bed was constructed in 1974 and commissioned, providing for a total of 870 beds for hospital.

Currently known as the University of Malaya Medical Centre (UMMC), it has 1,617 beds, which are distributed between 44 wards throughout the hospital.

The Faculty of Medicine was the first school that was instituted at UM in 1905, following the Education Commission report that stated the colonial region of Southeast Asia needed to address the shortage of medical assistants in the large cities of Singapore and Penang. This was after the first unsuccessful initial attempt to establish a medical school to train assistant surgeons in 1889. Back then, when the area was under the rule of the British Empire, the view that a medical school following a European system to be established in a colonial state was not particularly favoured among the European community and therefore, there were several obstacles to be overcome before the school could be established. However, despite the odds, in June 1905, under the Straits Legislative Council of Malaya, legislation of the establishment of a medical college in Singapore was passed under the Ordinance No. XV 1905. Following a public appeal for funds, the school opened on 3 July 1905 but only started its courses in September the same year. On 28 September 1905, Sir John Anderson officiated the school under the name "The Straits and Federal Malay States Government Medical School". Many years later when the present-day iteration of the University of Malaya was established in Kuala Lumpur, a new teaching and research facility with its own 500-bed hospital was also established.

The term "Medical Centre" was first used in 1963 to refer to the whole UMMC complex, which included the departments of the Faculty of Medicine, the hospital itself and the ancillary services attached to them. This was the definition used in the Hospital Act XXII of 1965, Statute XXVIII (The University Hospital) of 1967 and Statute XXXVI (The University Hospital) of 1971. It was also used in Statute XV New Series (The University Hospital) of 1977 which was amended by Statute XX (New Series) consequent to the 1975 amendments (A295) to the Universities and University Colleges Act 1971 (or UUCA).

Although the Faculty of Medicine was established by statute in 1962, planning, design and construction of the entire Medical Centre project only began actively from 1 February 1963, when Dr. T.J. Danaraj assumed duty as the first Professor of Medicine and the Foundation Dean of Medicine. The first batch of pre-medical students was admitted in May 1963 and were taught in the Faculty of Science. Teaching of the pre-clinical year began for the first time in May 1964 in the Faculty of Medicine premises. The faculty was officially opened on 2 August 1965 by then Deputy Prime Minister of Malaysia, Abdul Razak Hussein, who also laid the foundation stone of the university hospital on the same day. The hospital admitted its first patients in March 1967. The then King of Malaysia, Ismail Nasiruddin of Terengganu opened the University Hospital (which was later officially known as the Universiti Malaya Medical Centre sometime in the 1990s) on 5 August 1968. On this day, Dr. J.H.E. Griffiths, Professor Danaraj and Lim Chung Tat were also officiated as the Vice-Chancellor, The Dean of Medicine and the Registrar respectively. Today, UMMC stands as a statutory body under the Malaysian Ministry of Higher Education. The main objectives of UMMC are health services, learning and research, serving as the primary teaching hospital of the UM's Faculty of Medicine.

== Directors ==
1. Emeritus Professor Tan Sri Datuk T.J. Danaraj (1962 ~ 1972)
2. Dr. Haji Abbas bin Haji Alias (1973 ~ 31 May 1981)
3. Datuk Dr. Hussain bin Abdul Ghani (1 June 1981 ~ February 1983)
4. Dato' Dr. Abdul Talib bin Latiff (April 1983 ~ December 1984)
5. Dato’ Dr. Gurmukh Singh (1 January 1985 ~ 10 July 1991)
6. Brigadier General Dato' Dr. Samsudin bin Hussain (December 1991 ~ 16 June 1996)
7. Prof. Dato' Dr. Anuar Zaini bin Md Zain (August 1998 ~ 18 June 2000)
8. Prof. Tan Sri Mohd Amin bin Jalaludin (19 June 2000 ~ July 2006)
9. Prof. Dato' Dr. Ikram Shah bin Ismail (1 September 2006 ~ 31 July 2015)
10. Prof. Dr. Tunku Kamarul Zaman bin Tunku Zainol Abidin (12 August 2015 ~ 11 August 2020)
11. Prof. Dr. Nazirah binti Hasnan (2 November 2020 ~ 1 November 2025)
12. Prof. Dr. Mohd Zulkiflee bin Abu Bakar (2 November 2025 ~ present)

== See also ==
- UM Specialist Centre
- List of medical schools in Malaysia
- List of university hospitals
