= UM Specialist Centre =

UM Specialist Centre (UMSC)
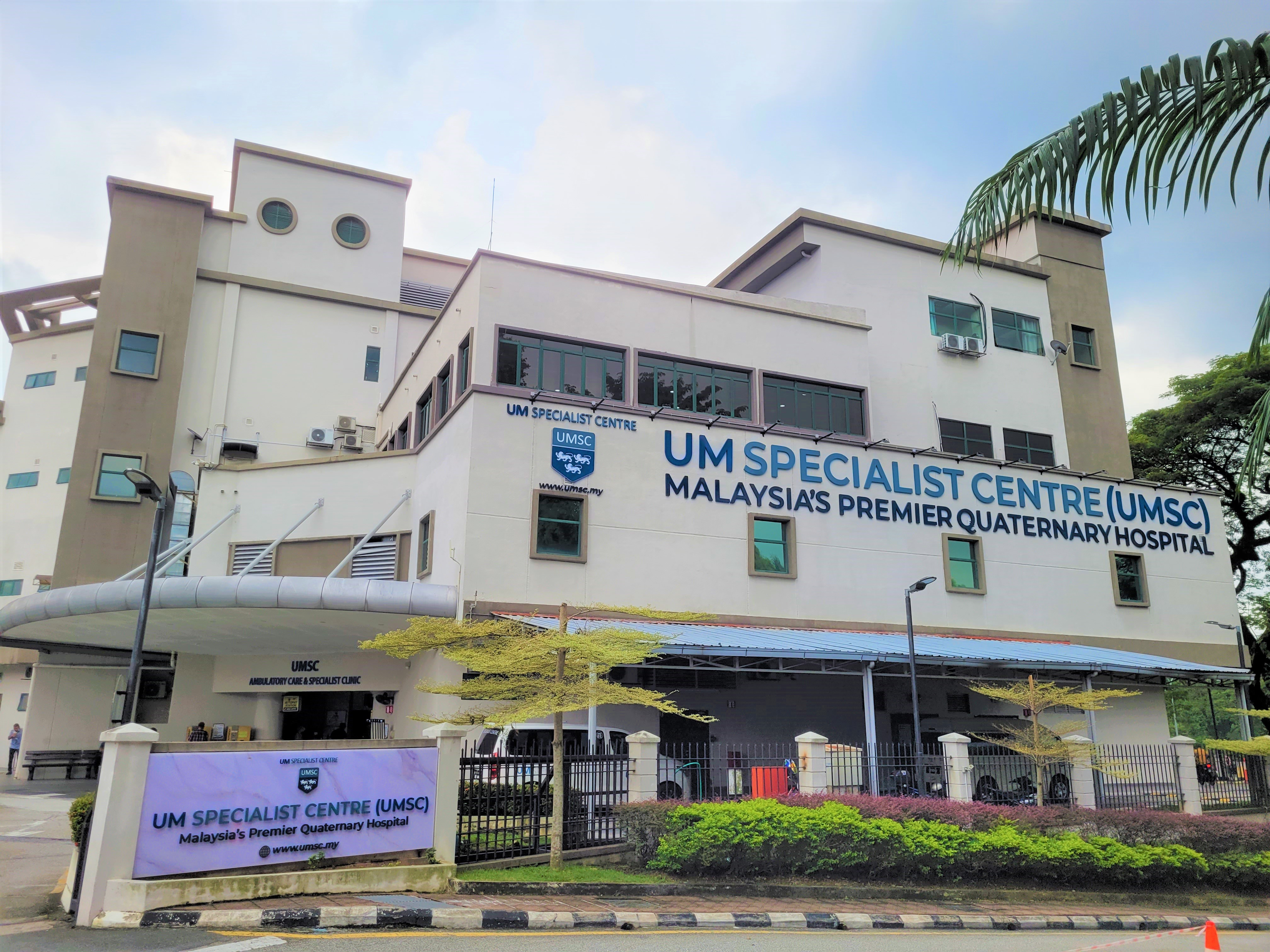
- UMSC Specialist Outpatient Clinic (SOC) at Lembah Pantai, Kuala Lumpur

Geography
- Location: Jalan Universiti, Lembah Pantai, Kuala Lumpur, Malaysia
- Coordinates: 3°6′58.2739″N 101°39′2.6669″E

Organisation
- Type: Specialist
- Affiliated university: Faculty of Medicine, University of Malaya

Services
- Beds: 99

History
- Founded: 1998

Links
- Website: umsc.my
- Lists: Hospitals in Malaysia

The UM Specialist Centre (UMSC; also known as the Universiti Malaya Specialist Centre) is a specialist center that has been in existence since 1998 in Malaysia located in Lembah Pantai, Kuala Lumpur. It was initially established as an initiative by the University of Malaya (UM) and its Faculty of Medicine (FOM) to halt the "brain drain" of medical experts from public sector to the private.

== History ==
Established in 1998, UMSC was initially located at University Malaya Medical Centre (UMMC) and in 2007 shifted to UMSC's own building. It is adjacent to the largest teaching hospital in Malaysia, UMMC and Malaysia's oldest medical school, the Faculty of Medicine, University of Malaya founded in 1962 which shares its roots with the National University of Singapore's Yong Loo Lin School of Medicine.

== Awards and recognition ==
Year	Award-giving body	Category	Recipient	Result	Ref.
2022	2021/2022 BrandLaureate Awards	Brand of The Year (Tertiary Medical Centre, Integrated Healthcare Support)	UM Specialist Centre	Won	
2022	2022 Talentbank Graduate Choice Awards	Graduates Choice of Employer (Top 10 in Healthcare, Hospital)	UM Specialist Centre	Won	
2023	2023 Healthcare Asia Awards	Quaternary Hospital of the Year	UM Specialist Centre	Won	

== See also ==
- University Malaya Medical Centre
- University of Malaya
- List of medical schools in Malaysia
- List of university hospitals
