= Sultan Abdul Aziz Shah Hospital =

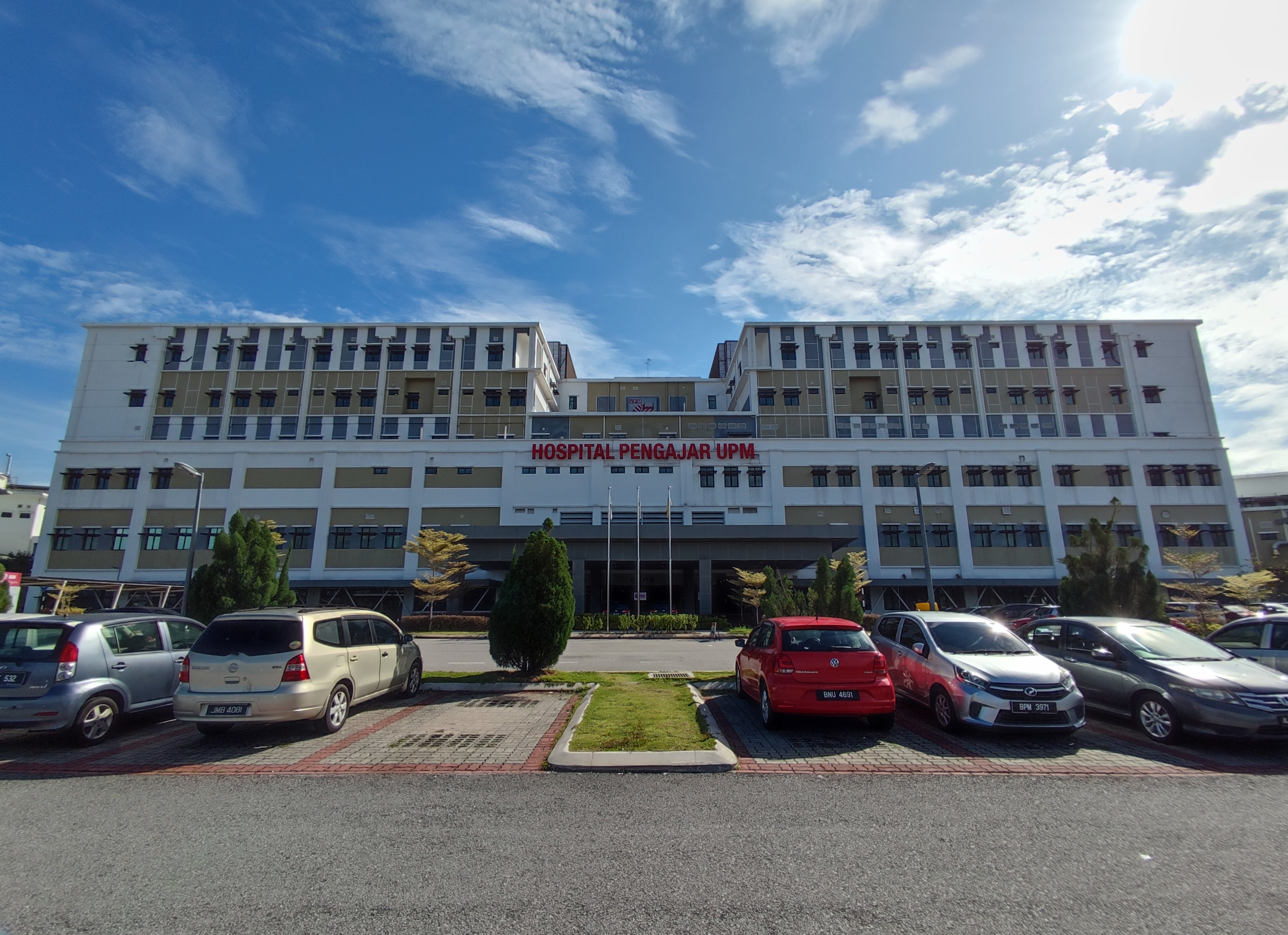
- Facade of HSAAS

Geography
- Location: Persiaran MARDI-UPM, Serdang, Selangor, Malaysia
- Coordinates: 2.980200°N 101.717747°E

Organisation
- Type: Teaching
- Affiliated university: Faculty of Medicine and Health Sciences, UPM

Services
- Emergency department: Yes
- Beds: 400

History
- Founded: 2019

Links
- Website: hsaas.upm.edu.my
- Lists: Hospitals in Malaysia

Sultan Abdul Aziz Shah Hospital (Malay: Hospital Sultan Abdul Aziz Shah, abbreviated HSAAS), formerly Hospital Pengajar UPM (UPM Teaching Hospital), is a teaching hospital managed by Universiti Putra Malaysia (UPM). It is located next to UPM's Faculty of Medicine and Health Sciences and Serdang Hospital.

== History ==
In 1996, UPM established its Faculty of Medicine and Health Sciences, prompting plans for a nearby teaching hospital. Due to differing goals between UPM and the Ministry of Health (KKM), Serdang Hospital became a public hospital under KKM rather than a UPM teaching facility. On 14 October 2011, UPM Vice-Chancellor Radin Umar Radin Sohadi proposed collaboration with KKM to the Cabinet to support teaching, research, and clinical services. After discussions, UPM opted to build a teaching hospital as a complement to Serdang Hospital, focusing on stroke, prostate, geriatric, and zoonotic care. Construction began on 27 October 2014 and finished on 15 March 2019, costing RM 582,227,497.73, far exceeding the initial RM 488 million estimate. On 28 February 2023, Sharafuddin of Selangor officially opened the hospital, naming it after UPM's first Chancellor, Salahuddin of Selangor.

== Role as PPV ==
During the COVID-19 pandemic, HSAAS served as a vaccination center (PPV) in Selangor.

== See also ==
- List of medical schools in Malaysia
- List of university hospitals
