= Lam Wah Ee Hospital =

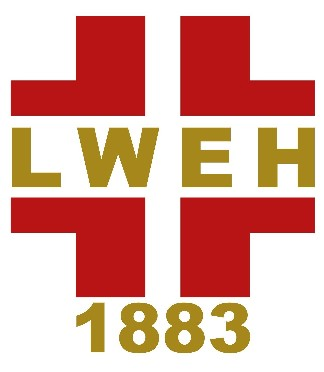

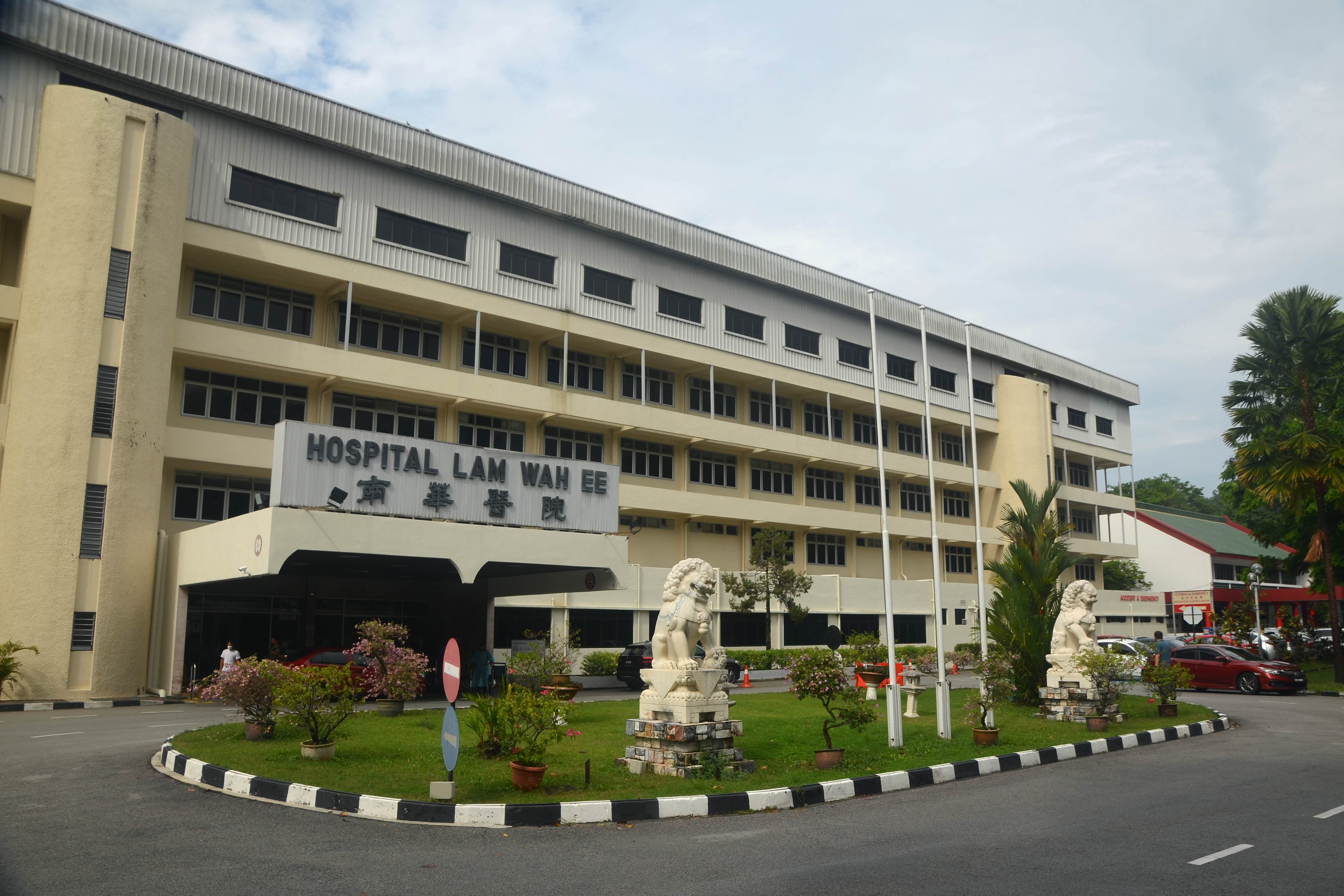
- Lam Wah Ee Hospital in May 2022

Geography
- Location: 141, Jalan Tan Sri Teh Ewe Lim, 11600 George Town, Penang, Malaysia
- Coordinates: 5.392173°N 100.303936°E

Organisation
- Type: General
- Affiliated university: Lam Wah Ee Nursing College

Services
- Emergency department: Yes
- Beds: 700+

History
- Founded: 1883; 143 years ago

Links
- Website: www.hlwe.com.my

Lam Wah Ee Hospital
- Traditional Chinese: 南華醫院
- Simplified Chinese: 南华医院
Transcriptions
Standard Mandarin
- Hanyu Pinyin: Nán Huá Yī Yuàn

Lam Wah Ee Hospital (simplified Chinese: 南华医院; traditional Chinese: 南華醫院; pinyin: Nán Huá Yī Yuàn) is a non-profit hospital in George Town within the Malaysian state of Penang. The 700-bed tertiary acute care hospital is accredited by the Malaysian Society for Quality in Health. It was established as a provider of traditional Chinese medicine in 1883 while its Western Medicine division commenced operations in 1983.

It also owns Lam Wah Ee Nursing College, the first private nursing college in northern Malaysia.

== Specialties ==
- Anaesthesiology
- Cardiology
- Cardiothoracic Surgery
- Cosmetic Surgery
- Dentistry
- Dermatology
- Ear, Nose and Throat Surgery
- Emergency Medicine
- Endocrinology
- Gastroenterology / Hepatology
- General Surgery
- Internal Medicine
- Neonatology
- Neurosurgery
- Nephrology
- Obstetrics and Gynaecology
- Ophthalmology
- Orthopaedics Surgery
- Paediatrics
- Paediatric Surgery
- Paediatric Neurology
- Pathology
- Prosthodontics
- Psychiatry
- Radiology
- Respiratory
- Sports Injury Surgery
- Spine Injury Surgery
- Traumatology
- Urology
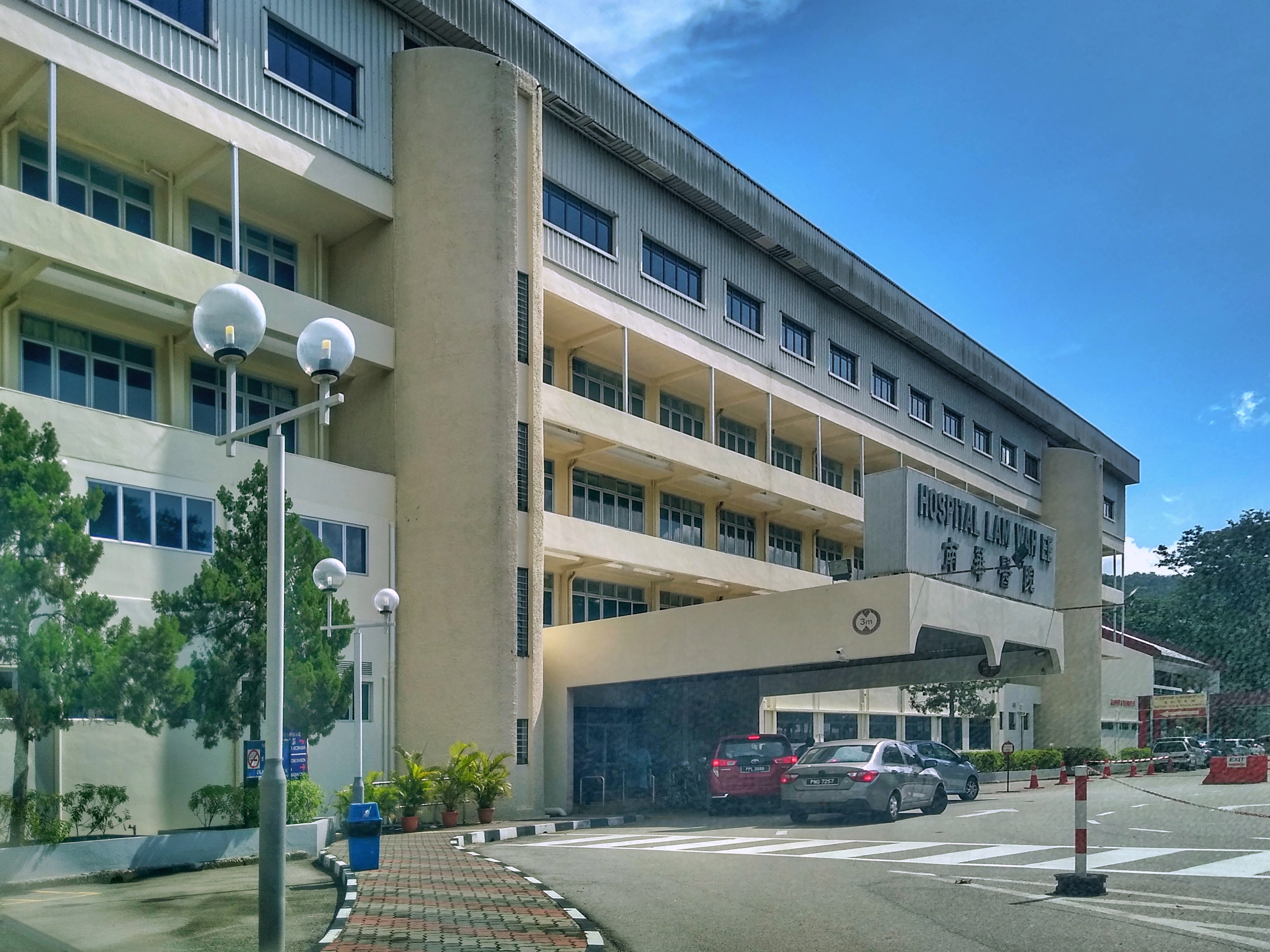
Lam Wah Ee Hospital main building

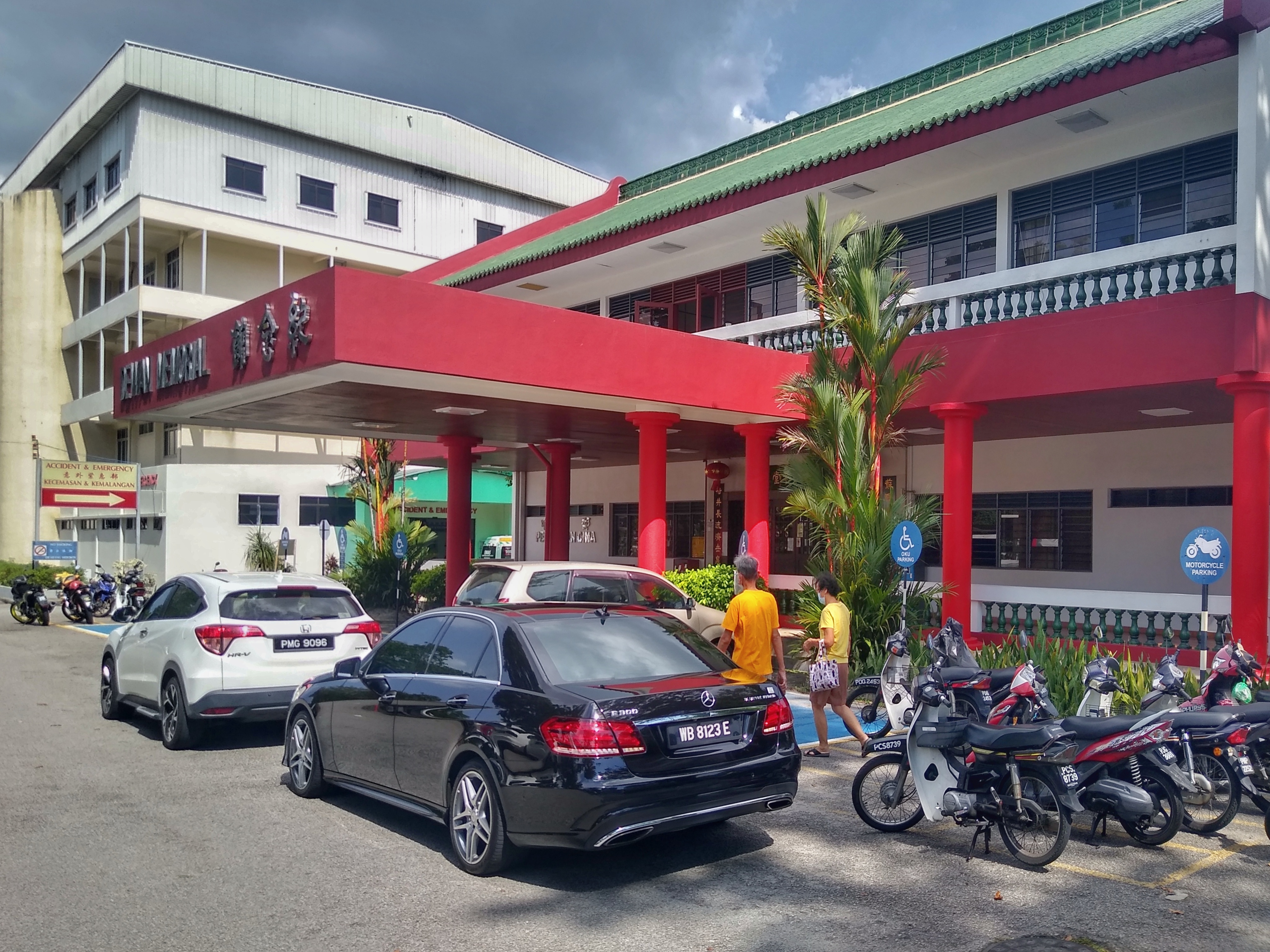
Chinese medicine building

== See also ==
- Healthcare in Malaysia
- Lam Wah Ee Nursing College
