= List of hospitals in Malaysia =

This is a list of government and private hospitals in Malaysia. In December 2016, there were 135 public hospitals and 9 special medical institutions in Malaysia, which accommodated 42,000 beds.

== Government hospitals ==
Name	Township/District
Johor
Sultanah Fatimah Specialist Hospital	Muar
Hospital Sultanah Nora Ismail	Batu Pahat
Hospital Enche Besar Hajjah Kalsom	Kluang
Hospital Segamat	Segamat
Hospital Pontian	Pontian
Hospital Kota Tinggi	Kota Tinggi
Hospital Mersing	Mersing
Hospital Tangkak	Tangkak
Hospital Temenggung Seri Maharaja Tun Ibrahim	Kulai
Hospital Permai Johor Bahru	Tampoi
Sultan Ismail Hospital	Johor Bahru
Hospital Sultanah Aminah	Johor Bahru
Hospital Pasir Gudang (under construction)	Pasir Gudang
Kedah
Sultanah Bahiyah Hospital	Alor Setar
Sultan Abdul Halim Hospital	Sungai Petani
Pendang Hospital	Pendang
Kulim Hospital	Kulim
Baling Hospital	Baling
Sik Hospital	Sik
Hospital Sultanah Maliha	Langkawi
Hospital Yan	Yan
Hospital Jitra	Jitra
Hospital Kuala Nerang	Kuala Nerang
Kelantan
Hospital Raja Perempuan Zainab II	Kota Bharu
Hospital Pasir Mas	Pasir Mas
Hospital Tumpat	Tumpat
Hospital Machang	Machang
Hospital Jeli	Jeli
Hospital Tanah Merah	Tanah Merah
Hospital Tengku Anis	Pasir Putih
Hospital Gua Musang	Gua Musang
Hospital Kuala Krai	Kuala Krai
Hospital Universiti Sains Malaysia (HUSM)	Kubang Kerian
Hospital Bachok	Bachok
Kuala Lumpur
Kuala Lumpur Hospital	Kuala Lumpur
Hospital Canselor Tuanku Muhriz UKM	Bandar Tun Razak
University Malaya Medical Centre	Kuala Lumpur
Hospital Angkatan Tentera Tuanku Mizan	Kuala Lumpur
Hospital Rehabilitasi Cheras	Cheras
Tunku Azizah Hospital	Kuala Lumpur
Labuan
Hospital Nukleus Labuan	Labuan
Health Department of Labuan	Labuan
Melaka
Malacca General Hospital	Malacca
Hospital Alor Gajah	Alor Gajah
Hospital Jasin	Jasin
Hospital Angkatan Tentera Terendak	Malacca
Negeri Sembilan
Tuanku Ja'afar Hospital	Seremban
Hospital Tuanku Ampuan Najihah	Kuala Pilah
Hospital Port Dickson	Port Dickson
Hospital Tampin	Tampin
Hospital Jelebu	Jelebu
Hospital Jempol	Jempol
Hospital Rembau	Rembau
Pahang
Tengku Ampuan Afzan Hospital	Kuantan
Hospital Pekan	Pekan
Hospital Kuala Lipis	Kuala Lipis
Hospital Raub	Raub
Hospital Bentong	Bentong
Hospital Jerantut	Jerantut
Hospital Jengka	Jengka
Hospital Muadzam Shah	Muadzam Shah
Hospital Sultan Haji Ahmad Shah	Temerloh
Hospital Cameron Highlands	Cameron Highlands
Hospital Rompin	Rompin
Hospital Universiti Islam Antabangsa (UIA)	Kuantan
Hospital Bera	Bera
Penang
Penang General Hospital	George Town
Hospital Sungai Bakap	Sungai Bakap
Hospital Bukit Mertajam	Bukit Mertajam
Hospital Balik Pulau	Balik Pulau
Hospital Seberang Jaya	Seberang Jaya
Hospital Kepala Batas	Kepala Batas
Perak
Batu Gajah Hospital	Batu Gajah
Hospital Bahagia Ulu Kinta	Tanjung Rambutan
Hospital Changkat Melintang	Changkat Melintang
Hospital Grik	Grik
Hospital Kampar	Kampar
Hospital Kuala Kangsar	Kuala Kangsar
Hospital Parit Buntar	Parit Buntar
Hospital Raja Permaisuri Bainun	Ipoh
Hospital Selama	Selama
Hospital Seri Manjung	Seri Manjung
Hospital Sungai Siput	Sungai Siput
Hospital Slim River	Slim River
Hospital Tapah	Tapah
Hospital Taiping	Taiping
Teluk Intan Hospital	Teluk Intan
Perlis
Hospital Tuanku Fauziah	Kangar
Putrajaya
Putrajaya Hospital	Putrajaya
National Cancer Institute	Putrajaya
Sabah
Queen Elizabeth Hospital	Kota Kinabalu
Duchess of Kent Hospital	Sandakan
Hospital Beaufort	Beaufort
Hospital Beluran	Beluran
Hospital Keningau	Keningau
Hospital Kinabatangan	Kinabatangan
Hospital Kota Belud	Kota Belud
Hospital Kota Marudu	Kota Marudu
Hospital Kuala Penyu	Kuala Penyu
Hospital Kudat	Kudat
Hospital Kunak	Kunak
Hospital Lahad Datu	Lahad Datu
Hospital Mesra Bukit Padang	Kota Kinabalu
Hospital Papar	Papar
Hospital Ranau	Ranau
Hospital Semporna	Semporna
Hospital Sipitang	Sipitang
Hospital Tambunan	Tambunan
Hospital Tawau	Tawau
Hospital Tenom	Tenom
Hospital Wanita dan Kanak-Kanak Sabah	Likas
Sarawak
Sarawak General Hospital	Kuching
Sarawak General Hospital (cardiac services)	Kota Samarahan
Hospital Bau	Bau
Hospital Sibu	Sibu
Miri Hospital	Miri
Hospital Sarikei	Sarikei
Hospital Sri Aman	Sri Aman
Hospital Limbang	Limbang
Hospital Lawas	Lawas
Hospital Kapit	Kapit
Hospital Sentosa	Kuching
Hospital Mukah	Mukah
Hospital Marudi	Marudi
Hospital Lundu	Lundu
Hospital Bintulu	Bintulu
Hospital Betong	Betong
Hospital Serian	Serian
Hospital Simunjan	Simunjan
Rajah Charles Brooke Memorial Hospital	Kuching
Hospital Kanowit	Kanowit
Hospital Saratok	Saratok
Hospital Dalat	Dalat
Selangor
Hospital Shah Alam	Shah Alam
Hospital Ampang	Ampang
Hospital Banting	Banting
Tengku Permaisuri Norashikin Hospital	Kajang
Hospital Kuala Kubu Baru	Kuala Kubu Baru
Hospital Selayang	Selayang
Sultan Idris Shah Serdang Hospital	Serdang
Sungai Buloh Hospital	Sungai Buloh
Hospital Tanjung Karang	Tanjung Karang
Hospital Tengku Ampuan Jemaah	Sabak Bernam
Tengku Ampuan Rahimah Hospital	Klang
Sultan Abdul Aziz Shah Hospital	Serdang
Al-Sultan Abdullah Hospital	Puncak Alam
Cyberjaya Hospital	Cyberjaya
Terengganu
Hospital Sultanah Nur Zahirah	Kuala Terengganu
Hospital Dungun	Dungun
Hospital Kemaman	Kemaman
Hospital Besut	Besut
Hospital Hulu Terengganu	Hulu Terengganu
Hospital Setiu	Setiu

== Private hospitals ==
=== Kedah ===
- Pantai Hospital Sungai Petani
- Kedah Medical Centre
- Putra Medical Centre
- Mahsuri Medical Centre
- Metro Specialist Hospital
- Pantai Hospital Laguna Merbok
- Ins Specialist Centre
- Aurelius Hospital Alor Setar

=== Kuala Lumpur ===
- UM Specialist Centre (UMSC)
- Beacon Hospital, Petaling Jaya - Petaling Jaya
- iHEAL Medical Centre – Mid Valley, Kuala Lumpur
- Columbia Asia Hospital – Setapak
- Global Doctors Specialist Centre
- Columbia Asia Hospital – Setapak, Kuala Lumpur
- Prince Court Medical Centre
- ALPS Medical Centre
- Gleneagles Kuala Lumpur (formerly Gleneagles Intan Medical)
- Damai Service Hospital (Taman Melawati) Sdn. Bhd.
- Sentosa Medical Centre
- Tung Shin Hospital
- Pantai Medical Centre
- Lourdes Medical Centre
- Poliklinik Mallal Ear, Nose, and Throat Clinic (Brickfields/KL Sentral)
- Sambhi Clinic & Nursing Home
- Damai Service Hospital
- Samuel Clinic & Specialist Maternity & Clinic for Women
- Pusat Rawatan Islam S/B
- Roopi Medical Centre
- Pusat Pakar Tawakal S/B
- KPJ Tawakkal Specialist Hospital
- Chinese Maternity Hospital
- Pantai Cheras Medical Centre
- Taman Desa Medical Centre
- Cheras Geriatric Centre
- Apollo TTDI Medical Centre
- Poliklinik Kotaraya
- Sentul Hospital
- Hospital Pantai Indah
- Hospital Danau Kota
- Pudu Specialist Centre
- Al-Islam Medical Centre (formerly Kampung Baru Medical Centre)
- Clinic Rosman – YKN Dialysis
- OneMedCare – physiotherapy, wound care, beauty and wellness
- ALTY Orthopaedic Hospital
- IJN- Institut Jantung Negara
- Cardiac Vascular Sentral Kuala Lumpur (CVSKL)
- Hospital Picaso
- Solace Asia – Drug and alcohol rehabilitation centre

=== Negeri Sembilan ===
- Columbia Asia Hospital – Seremban
- Aurelius Hospital Nilai, Negeri Sembilan, Malaysia
- Seremban Specialist Hospital
- Senawang Specialist Hospital
- Mawar Medical Centre, Seremban, Negeri Sembilan
- CMH Specialist Hospital, Seremban, Negeri Sembilan

=== Penang ===
- Mount Miriam Cancer Hospital
- Penang Adventist Hospital
- Georgetown Specialist Hospital
- Lam Wah Ee Hospital
- Island Hospital
- Loh Guan Lye Specialists Centre
- Gleneagles Medical Centre
- KPJ Penang Specialist Hospital
- Bagan Specialist Centre
- Pantai Hospital Penang
- Kek Lok Si Charitable Hospital
- Sunway Medical Centre Penang
- Northern Heart Hospital

=== Perak ===
- Columbia Asia Hospital – Taiping
- Fatimah Hospital
- Perak Community Specialist Hospital
- KPJ Ipoh Specialist Hospital
- Kinta Medical Centre
- Pantai Hospital Ipoh
- Sunway Medical Centre Ipoh
- Pusat Pakar Rajindar Singh, Teluk Intan
- Anson Bay Medical Centre, Teluk Intan
- Maxwell Maternity & Surgical Centre
- Apollo Medical Centre
- Taiping Medical Centre
- Pantai Hospital Manjung
- KPJ Centre Manjung
- UTAR Hospital Kampar

Name	Township/district	Federal territory/state	Type	Ownership	Beds	Staff
Landmark Medical Centre	Johor Bahru	Johor	Private	Landmark Medical Centre Sdn Bhd		
KPJ Johor Specialist Hospital	Johor Bahru	Johor	Private	KPJ Healthcare		
KPJ Kluang Specialist Hospital	Kluang	Johor	Private	KPJ Healthcare	50	
KPJ Bandar Maharani Specialist Hospital	Muar	Johor	Private	KPJ Healthcare	82	
KPJ Batu Pahat Specialist Hospital	Batu Pahat	Johor	Private	KPJ Healthcare	25	
KPJ Pasir Gudang Specialist Hospital	Pasir Gudang, Johor Bahru	Johor	Private	KPJ Healthcare	148	
KPJ Puteri Specialist Hospital	Larkin, Johor Bahru	Johor	Private	KPJ Healthcare	151	
KPJ Bandar Dato' Onn Specialist Hospital	Bandar Dato' Onn, Johor Bahru	Johor	Private	KPJ Healthcare		
Kempas Medical Centre	Kempas, Johor Bahru	Johor	Private	Kempas Views Sdn Bhd		
Colombia Asia Hospital – Tebrau	Tebrau, Johor Bahru	Johor	Private	Columbia Asia Group	205	
Colombia Asia Hospital – Iskandar Puteri	Iskandar Puteri, Johor Bahru	Johor	Private	Columbia Asia Group		
Hospital Penawar	Pasir Gudang, Johor Bahru	Johor	Private	Penawar Healthcare Group	70	
Gleneagles Hospital Medini	Iskandar Puteri, Johor Bahru	Johor	Private	IHH Healthcare	300	
Pantai Hospital Batu Pahat	Batu Pahat	Johor	Private	IHH Healthcare	116	39
Regency Specialist Hospital	Masai. Johor Bahru	Johor	Private	Health Management International Pte Ltd (HMI Group Singapore)	218	
Putra Specialist Hospital	Batu Pahat	Johor	Private	Intelek Ceria Sdn Bhd – Putra Group of Hospitals		
KPJ Perdana Specialist Hospital	Kota Bharu	Kelantan	Private	KPJ Healthcare	124	
Kota Bahru Medical Centre	Kota Bahru	Kelantan	Private	Intelek Ceria Sdn Bhd – Putra Group of Hospitals	48	
AN-NISA' Medical Centre	Kota Bharu	Kelantan	Private	Kelantan State Economic Development Corporation		
USAINS Hospital	Kota Bharu	Kelantan	Private	USAINS Holding Sdn Bhd		
Sunway Medical Centre	Kota Bharu	Kelantan	Private	Sunway Healthcare Group	200	
Columbia Asia Hospital	Wangsa Maju	Kuala Lumpur	Private	Columbia Asia Group		
Columbia Asia Hospital	Bukit Jalil	Kuala Lumpur	Private	Columbia Asia Group		
National Heart Institute	Kuala Lumpur	Kuala Lumpur	Private	Institut Jantung Negara Sdn Bhd – state-owned enterprise	432	
Gleneagles Hospital Kuala Lumpur	Kuala Lumpur	Kuala Lumpur	Private	IHH Healthcare	369	
Prince Court Medical Centre	Kuala Lumpur	Kuala Lumpur	Private	IHH Healthcare	270	
Pantai Hospital Kuala Lumpur	Kuala Lumpur	Kuala Lumpur	Private	IHH Healthcare	499	200+
Pantai Hospital Ampang	Pandan Indah	Kuala Lumpur	Private	IHH Healthcare	117	73
KMI Taman Desa Medical Centre	Kuala Lumpur	Kuala Lumpur	Private	Kumpulan Medic Iman Sdn Bhd – KMI Healthcare		
ParkCity Medical Centre (PMC)	Kepong	Kuala Lumpur	Private	Asia OneHealthcare Group	300	
Sunway Medical Centre	Cheras	Kuala Lumpur	Private	Sunway Healthcare Group	351	
Gleneagles Hospital Penang	George Town	Pulau Pinang	Private	IHH Healthcare	360	
Pantai Hospital Penang	Bayan Lepas	Pulau Pinang	Private	IHH Healthcare	209	76
Sunway Medical Centre	Seberang Jaya	Pulau Pinang	Private	Sunway Healthcare Group	180	
Mahkota Medical Centre	Malacca City	Melaka	Private	Health Management International Pte Ltd (HMI Group Singapore)	305	
Oriental Melaka Straits Medical Centre	Malacca City	Melaka	Private	Oriental Holdings Berhad (OHB)	300	
Pantai Hospital Ayer Keroh	Ayer Keroh	Melaka	Private	IHH Healthcare	229	533
Putra Specialist Hospital	Malacca City	Melaka	Private	Putra Specialist Hospital (Melaka) Sdn Bhd – Melaka State Government		
Anson Bay Medical Centre	Teluk Intan	Perak	Private	Intelek Ceria Sdn Bhd – Putra Group of Hospitals		
Sunway Medical Centre	Ipoh	Perak	Private	Sunway Healthcare Group	260	
Pantai Hospital Manjung	Seri Manjung	Perak	Private	IHH Healthcare	59	34
Pantai Hospital Ipoh	Ipoh	Perak	Private	IHH Healthcare	225	122
Putra Medical Centre	Alor Setar	Kedah	Private	Unique Luxury Sdn Bhd		
Kedah Medical Centre	Alor Setar	Kedah	Private	KPJ Healthcare Berhad	160	
Metro Specialist Hospital	Sungai Petani	Kedah	Private	Metro Specialist Hospital	320	
Pantai Hospital Sungai Petani	Sungai Petani	Kedah	Private	IHH Healthcare	131	42
Pantai Hospital Laguna Merbok	Sungai Petani	Kedah	Private	IHH Healthcare	95	27
KPJ Sabah Specialist Hospital	Kota Kinabalu	Sabah	Private	KPJ Healthcare Berhad		
KPJ Damai Care & Wellness Centre	Kota Kinabalu	Sabah	Private	KPJ Healthcare Berhad		
Jesselton Medical Centre	Kota Kinabalu	Sabah	Private	Jesselton Medical Centre Sdn Bhd		
Gleneagles Kota Kinabalu Hospital	Kota Kinabalu	Sabah	Private	IHH Healthcare	200	
KMI Tawau Medical Centre	Tawau	Sabah	Private	Kumpulan Medic Iman Sdn Bhd – KMI Healthcare	25	
Rafflesia Medical Centre	Penampang	Sabah	Private	30		
Tawau Specialist Medical Centre	Tawau	Sabah	Private	Tawau Medical Specialist Centre Sabah Sdn Bhd		
KPJ Perlis Specialist Hospital	Kangar	Perlis	Private	KPJ Healthcare Berhad	80	
Sunway TCM Centre	Kuching	Sarawak	Private	Sunway Healthcare Group		
Columbia Asia Hospital	Bintulu	Sarawak	Private	Columbia Asia Group		
Columbia Asia Hospital	Miri	Sarawak	Private	Columbia Asia Group		
KPJ Sibu Specialist Hospital	Sibu	Sarawak	Private	KPJ Healthcare Berhad		
Rejang Medical Centre	Sibu	Sarawak	Private			
Normah Medical Specialist Centre	Kuching	Sarawak	Private	Sarawak Medical Centre Sdn Bhd – state-owned enterprise	130	
KPJ Kuching Specialist Hospital	Kuching	Sarawak	Private	KPJ Healthcare Berhad		
Timberland Medical Centre	Kuching	Sarawak	Private			
Borneo Medical Centre	Kuching	Sarawak	Private			
Bintulu Medical Centre	Bintulu	Sarawak	Private			
Miri City Medical Centre	Miri	Sarawak	Private			
Andalas Medical Centre	Klang	Selangor	Private	Andalas Medical Centre Sdn Bhd		
ANDORRA Women and Children Hospital	Seri Kembangan	Selangor	Private			
Alpha Specialist Centre	Kota Damansara	Selangor	Private			
Ara Damansara Medical Centre (ADMC)	Ara Damansara	Selangor	Private	Asia OneHealthcare Group	220	
Assunta Hospital	Petaling Jaya	Selangor	Private			
Avisena Specialist Hospital	Shah Alam	Selangor	Private	Avisena Healthcare Sdn Bhd		
Avisena Specialist Hospital 2	Shah Alam	Selangor	Private	Avisena Healthcare Sdn Bhd		
Beacon Hospital	Petaling Jaya	Selangor	Private			
BP Specialist Centre	Taman Megah	Selangor	Private			
Bukit Tinggi Medical Centre (BTMC)	Klang	Selangor	Private	Asia OneHealthcare Group	171	
Columbia Asia Hospital	Klang	Selangor	Private	Columbia Asia Group		
Columbia Asia Hospital	Cheras	Selangor	Private	Columbia Asia Group		
Columbia Asia Hospital	Puchong	Selangor	Private	Columbia Asia Group		
Columbia Asia Hospital	Bukit Rimau	Selangor	Private	Columbia Asia Group		
Columbia Asia Hospital	Petaling Jaya	Selangor	Private	Columbia Asia Group		
Columbia Asia Extended Care Hospital	Shah Alam	Selangor	Private	Columbia Asia Group		
JMC Specialist Medical Centre	Klang	Selangor	Private		26	
Hospital Picaso	Petaling Jaya	Selangor	Private	Asia OneHealthcare Group	52	
Hospital UMRA	Shah Alam	Selangor	Private			
Hospital Wanita Metro	Banting	Selangor	Private	Hospital Wanita Metro Sdn Bhd		
Hospital Wanita Metro	Klang	Selangor	Private	Hospital Wanita Metro Sdn Bhd		
Hospital Wanita Metro	Kuala Selangor	Selangor	Private	Hospital Wanita Metro Sdn Bhd		
Kajang Specialist Maternity & Surgery	Kajang	Selangor	Private			
KMI Kelana Jaya Medical Centre	Kelana Jaya	Selangor	Private	Kumpulan Medic Iman Sdn Bhd – KMI Healthcare	42	
KPJ Ampang Puteri Specialist Hospital	Ampang Jaya	Selangor	Private	KPJ Healthcare Berhad		
KPJ Damansara Specialist Hospital	Damansara Utama	Selangor	Private	KPJ Healthcare Berhad		
KPJ Damansara Specialist Hospital 2	Bukit Lanjan	Selangor	Private	KPJ Healthcare Berhad		
KPJ Kajang Specialist Hospital	Kajang	Selangor	Private	KPJ Healthcare Berhad		
KPJ Rawang Specialist Hospital	Rawang	Selangor	Private	KPJ Healthcare Berhad		
KPJ Selangor Specialist Hospital	Shah Alam	Selangor	Private	KPJ Healthcare Berhad		
Kajang Plaza Medical Centre	Kajang	Selangor	Private	KPMC		
KPMC Puchong Specialist Centre	Puchong	Selangor	Private	KPMC		
MSU Medical Centre	Shah Alam	Selangor	Private	Management & Science University	250	
Putra Medical Centre	Sungai Buloh	Selangor	Private	Darul Aiman Sdn Bhd		
Pantai Hospital Klang	Klang	Selangor	Private	IHH Healthcare	107	223
Pantai Hospital Cheras	Cheras	Selangor	Private	IHH Healthcare	127	80+
Sungai Long Specialist Hospital	Kajang	Selangor	Private	Intelek Ceria Sdn Bhd – Putra Group of Hospitals		
Subang Jaya Medical Centre (SJMC)	Subang Jaya	Selangor	Private	Asia OneHealthcare Group	444	
Sunway Specialist Centre	Kota Damansara	Selangor	Private	Sunway Healthcare Group		
Salam Specialist Hospital	Shah Alam	Selangor	Private	SALAM Group of Hospital	80	
Sentosa Specialist Hospital	Klang	Selangor	Private		60	
Sheela Women Specialist Centre	Klang	Selangor	Private			
Sri Kota Specialist Medical Centre	Klang	Selangor	Private		232	
Sunway Medical Centre	Sunway City	Selangor	Private	Sunway Healthcare Group	724	
Thomson Hospital	Kota Damansara	Selangor	Private	TMC Life Sciences Berhad	205	
UiTM Private Specialist Centre	Sungai Buloh	Selangor	Private	Universiti Teknologi MARA		
University Malaya Specialist Centre	Petaling Jaya	Selangor	Private	University Malaya		
QHC Medical Centre	Subang Jaya	Selangor	Private			
Sunway TCM Centre	Sunway City	Selangor	Private	Sunway Healthcare Group		
KMI Kuala Terengganu Medical Centre	Kuala Terengganu	Terengganu	Private	Kumpulan Medic Iman Sdn Bhd – KMI Healthcare		
SALAM Specialist Hospital	Kuala Terengganu	Terengganu	Private	SALAM Group of Hospital		
Hospital Pengajar UnisZ	Kuala Nerus	Terengganu	Private			
Darul Makmur Medical Centre	Kuantan	Pahang	Private			
KMI Kuantan Medical Centre	Kuantan	Pahang	Private	Kumpulan Medic Iman Sdn Bhd – KMI Healthcare		
KPJ Pahang Specialist Hospital	Kuantan	Pahang	Private	KPJ Healthcare Berhad	188	
