= Sultan Haji Ahmad Shah Hospital =

Coordinates: 3.453660°N 102.451415°E

Geography
- Location: Temerloh, Pahang, Malaysia

Organisation
- Care system: Public
- Type: District General

Services
- Emergency department: Yes
- Beds: 650

History
- Founded: 2005

Links
- Website: hoshas.moh.gov.my
- Lists: Hospitals in Malaysia

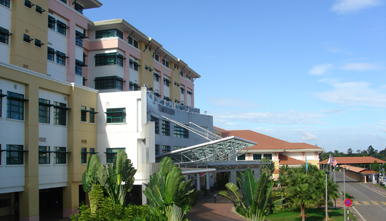
The new state-of-the-art hospital of Temerloh, Hospital Sultan Haji Ahmad Shah

Sultan Haji Ahmad Shah Hospital, formerly known as Hospital Temerloh, is a government-funded multi-specialty hospital with 650 beds. It is located in the district of Temerloh, Pahang, Malaysia, and is situated along the Kuala Lumpur-Kuantan Highway on an 18-hectare (44-acre) site.

== History ==
The hospital was initially proposed to replace the over-century-old Hospital Mentakab. It was intended to meet the growing healthcare needs of the Temerloh district and serve as a referral center for Kuala Lipis, Raub, Maran, Bentong, Jerantut and Bera.

Hospital construction began in June 2002 and was completed on January 15 2005, within a record 34-month period. The construction cost was RM480 million. The hospital's various healthcare services were implemented in stages between March 2005 and April 16 2005.

The hospital was officially opened by Sultan Haji Ahmad Shah of Pahang on 27 March 2006. The name change from Hospital Temerloh to Sultan Haji Ahmad Shah Hospital honored the Sultan's gracious consent to launch the facility.

The pediatric daycare ward was refurbished by Amway in 2007.
