= Penang General Hospital =

Public hospital in George Town, Penang, Malaysia

Penang General Hospital Hospital Pulau Pinang
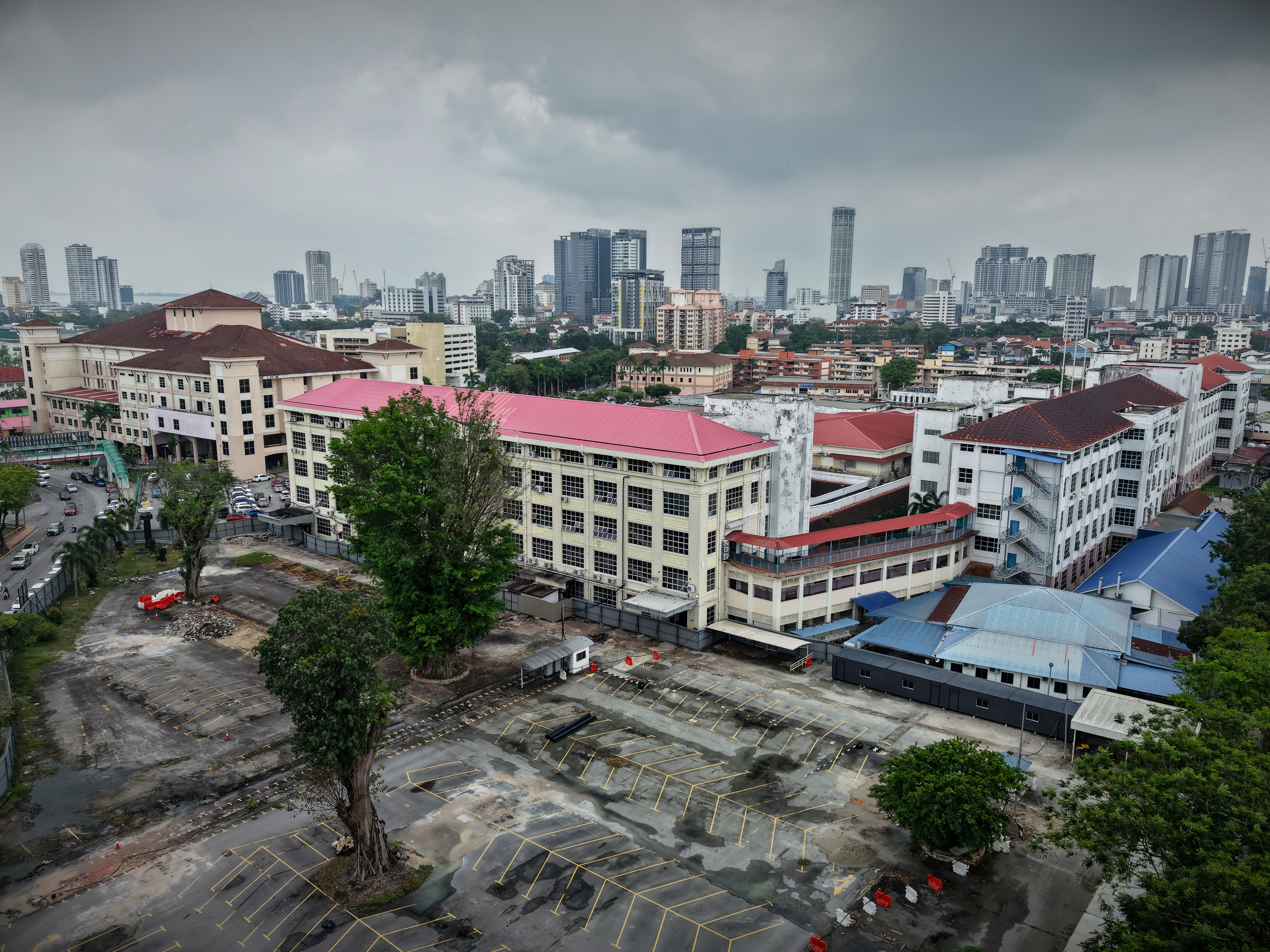

Geography
- Location: Residency Road, 10990 George Town, Penang, Malaysia
- Coordinates: 5.416517°N 100.311094°E

Organisation
- Type: General

Services
- Emergency department: Yes
- Beds: 1090

Helipads
- Helipad: Yes

History
- Opened: 1854

Links
- Website: Official website (in Malay)

The Penang General Hospital is the public hospital of the city of George Town within the Malaysian state of Penang. Opened in 1854, it is the largest government hospital in Penang as well as the state's oldest. The healthcare centre also serves as the tertiary referral hospital for northern Malaysia.

The hospital had its origins as a medical centre founded in 1854 for the poor and opium addicts.

== History ==
The hospital land was given to the British Malaya government in 1882 for them to construct a hospital. In 1930, the nurse dormitory was constructed. In 1935, block A and block C of the hospital were constructed. In 1939, the maternity hospital was constructed. In 1989, the central administration center blocks were constructed.

== Architecture ==
- Block A
- Block B
- Block C

== See also ==
- List of hospitals in Malaysia
- Healthcare in Malaysia
