= Hospital Canselor Tuanku Muhriz UKM =

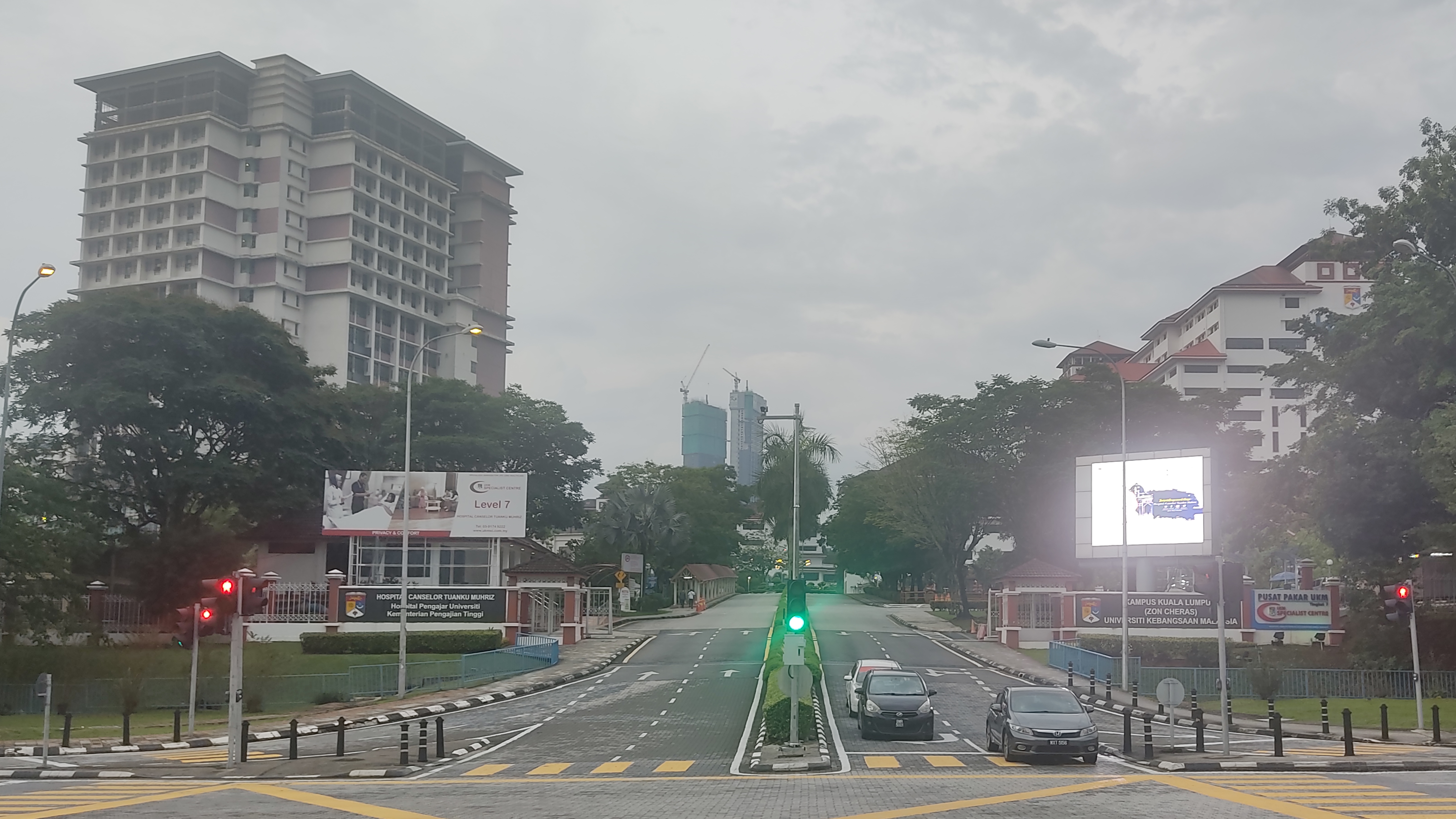

Geography
- Location: Jalan Yaacob Latif, Bandar Tun Razak, Cheras, Kuala Lumpur, Malaysia
- Coordinates: 3.098434°N 101.726122°E

Organisation
- Type: Teaching
- Affiliated university: Universiti Kebangsaan Malaysia

Services
- Standards: National standards
- Emergency department: Yes

History
- Former names: UKM Medical Centre; Hospital Universiti Kebangsaan Malaysia; HUKM
- Founded: 1976 (original), 1997 (HUKM)

Links
- Website: hctm.ukm.my
- Lists: Hospitals in Malaysia

Hospital Canselor Tuanku Muhriz UKM (lit. 'Tuanku Muhriz Chancellor Hospital' or HCTM, formerly known as Pusat Perubatan Universiti Kebangsaan Malaysia (PPUKM, National University of Malaysia Medical Centre), is a hospital located in Bandar Tun Razak, Kuala Lumpur and is administered by the National University of Malaysia. It is one of the ten university hospitals in Malaysia. It is located

The hospital has a special ward for cancer treatment sponsored by MAKNA and Maybank. In future, the hospital, together with UKM Child Specialist Hospital (Malay: Hospital Pakar Kanak-Kanak, Universiti Kebangsaan Malaysia; HPKK-UKM) located next to it, will be connected with MRT Circle Line via Jalan Yaacob Latif MRT station.

== History ==
Hospital Canselor Tuanku Muhriz UKM (previous name: Pusat Perubatan Universiti Kebangsaan Malaysia, PPUKM) has an interlinked history with the Faculty of Medicine, UKM. The faculty was formed on 30 May 1972. This faculty started the premedical course at the Faculty of Sciences, Main Campus of UKM at Jalan Pantai Baru, Kuala Lumpur in May 1973. The first batch numbering up to 44 students attended the course. Pre-Clinical Medical Course started in May 1974 at the temporary building allocated for Medical Faculty in the Kuala Lumpur Hospital (HKL) area. On 27 February 1975, the Ministry of Health officially agreed to designate HKL as the teaching hospital for UKM and since May 1976 all clinical courses are done at HKL. In 1977, a permanent building for the Medical Faculty beside HKL was completed and could be used fully.

Alongside the faculty building, courses related to medicine are also being conducted at the Branch Campus, Hospital Branch Tanjung Karang and Health Clinic Ibu at Tanjung Karang, Selangor. Research in the field of medicine was increased to improve the faculty's role in the field of medicine and education. By increasing the number of medical students and by starting the Degree Continuation Program, the usage of clinical equipment training at Ministry of Health hospitals was expanded.

Furthermore, with the Ministry of Health and the Faculty of Medicine worked in close co-operation, more doctors have graduated. The medical students are trained in General Surgery, Orthopedic Surgery and Otolaryngology Surgery, Ophthalmology Surgery, Radiology, Pediatric, Psychiatric, Anesthesiology, Medicine and Obstetric and Gynecology. The Faculty of Medicine currently offers courses at the Doctor of Philosophy level for the preclinical program.

Support for expansion and in line with the needs of the nation caused the allocated building for Faculty of Medicine and HKL unable to fulfill the current requirements for educating, service and research. In 1990, the Faculty of Medicine decided to set up its own teaching hospital for long-term use. On 2 November 1993, construction of the Hospital Universiti Kebangsaan Malaysia in Cheras commenced.

By 1 July 1997, HUKM was completed and started operating and on 14 July 1998, Mahathir Mohamad, the then Prime Minister of Malaysia officially opened HUKM.

However, on 14 December 2007, the Faculty of Medicine and HUKM have combined to create the entity known as Pusat Perubatan UKM, or UKM Medical Centre, with the motto For Integrating Learning and Research Society. PPUKM was led by a Dean Director who is responsible for managing all of the academic, research and clinical services at the centre. The restructured entity will allow the functions and activities of the separate institutions, faculties and hospitals to coordinate and run more efficiently, improving productivity and ways of working. This will ensure that the administration course activities and research can be done more efficiently, including services offered. All this will improve PPUKM performance and increase its standard in international medical institutions.

In 2010, PPUKM was renamed & rebranded as Hospital Canselor Tuanku Muhriz UKM (HCTM-UKM), in honour of His Royal Highness Tuanku Muhriz ibni Almarhum Tuanku Munawir, the Yang di-Pertuan Besar of Negeri Sembilan and the Lord Chancellor of UKM.

== See also ==
- List of medical schools in Malaysia
- List of university hospitals
