= Northern Heart Hospital =

Hospital in Penang, Malaysia

Northern Heart Hospital Penang
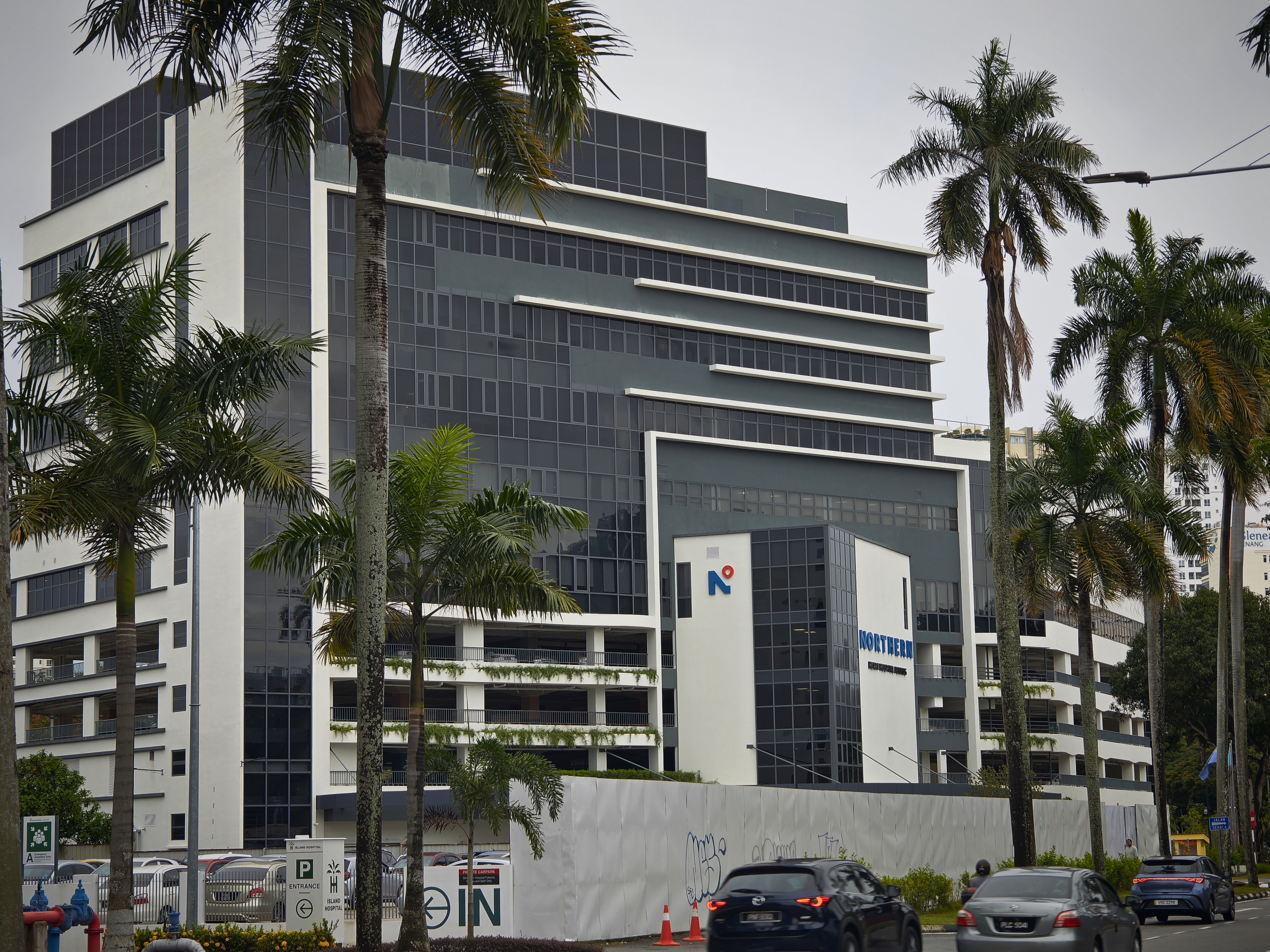

Geography
- Location: 2 Peel Avenue, 10350 George Town, Penang, Malaysia
- Coordinates: 5.4244°N 100.316°E

Services
- Emergency department: Yes
- Beds: 56

History
- Founded: 2024

Links
- Website: www.nhearthospital.com

Northern Heart Hospital Penang, the first and only purpose-built cardiac and vascular specialist hospital in Penang and northern Malaysia.

== Description ==
Founded in 2018, is the first and only purpose-built cardiac and vascular specialist hospital in Penang and northern Malaysia, led by highly reputable and experienced clinicians, providing comprehensive heart and vascular care under one roof in the heart of George Town.

== See also ==
- List of hospitals in Malaysia
