= Georgetown Specialist Hospital =

Hospital in Penang, Malaysia

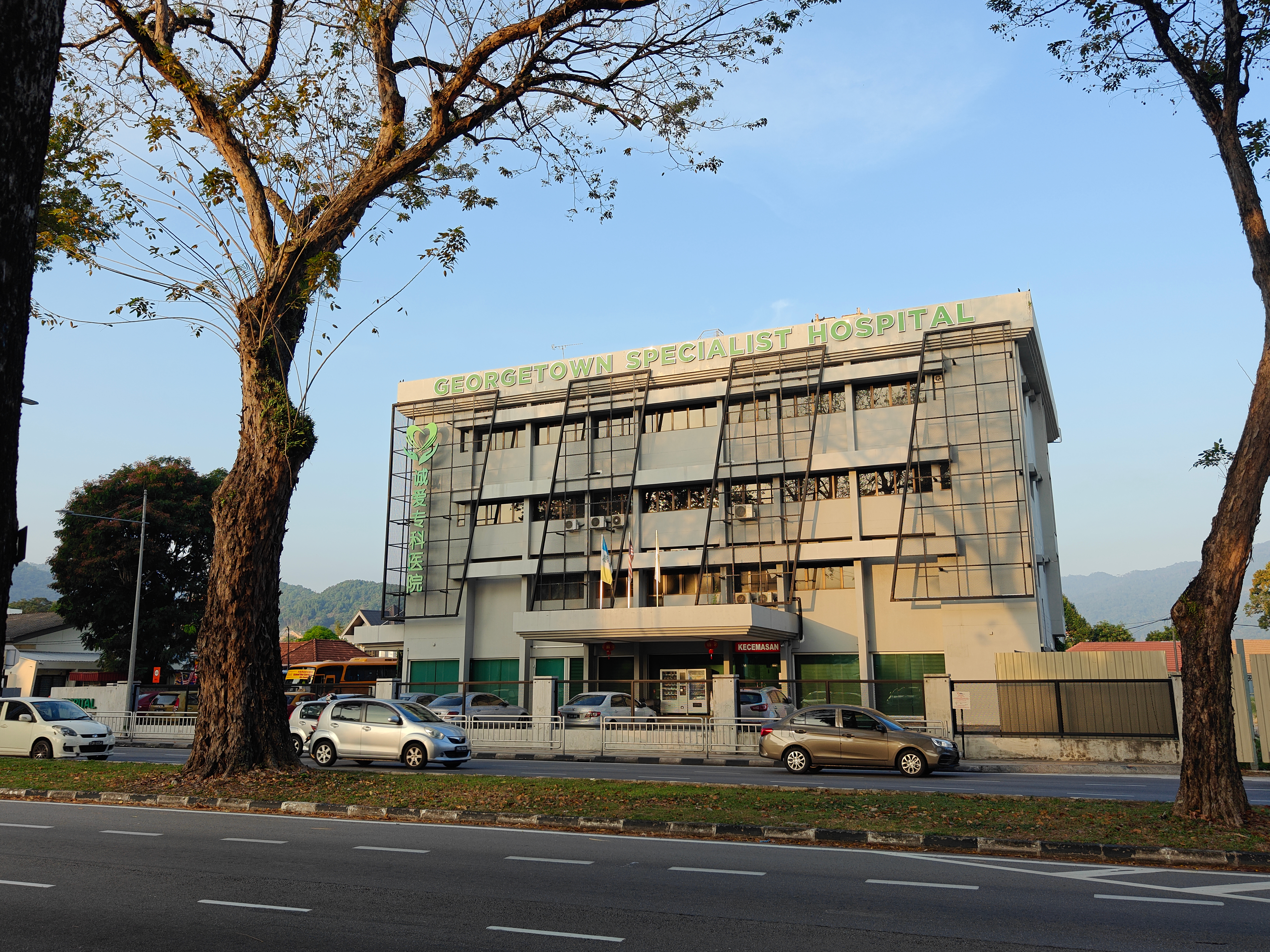

Geography
- Location: 12A, Green Lane, 11600 George Town, Penang, Malaysia
- Coordinates: 5.402592°N 100.303686°E

Services
- Emergency department: Yes
- Beds: 20

History
- Founded: 2019

Links
- Website: georgetownspecialist.com

Georgetown Specialist Hospital is a private hospital in George Town within the Malaysian state of Penang. Established in 2019, the 20-bed hospital at Green Lane offers services including internal medicine, nephrology, orthopaedics, gastroenterology, hepatology, endoscopy, urology and general surgery. The planned expansion of the hospital will cost an additional RM350 million and increase its capacity to 300 beds, as well as the addition of eight operating theatres to its facilities.

== See also ==
- List of hospitals in Malaysia
