= KPJ Sabah Specialist Hospital =

- KPJ Healthcare Berhad
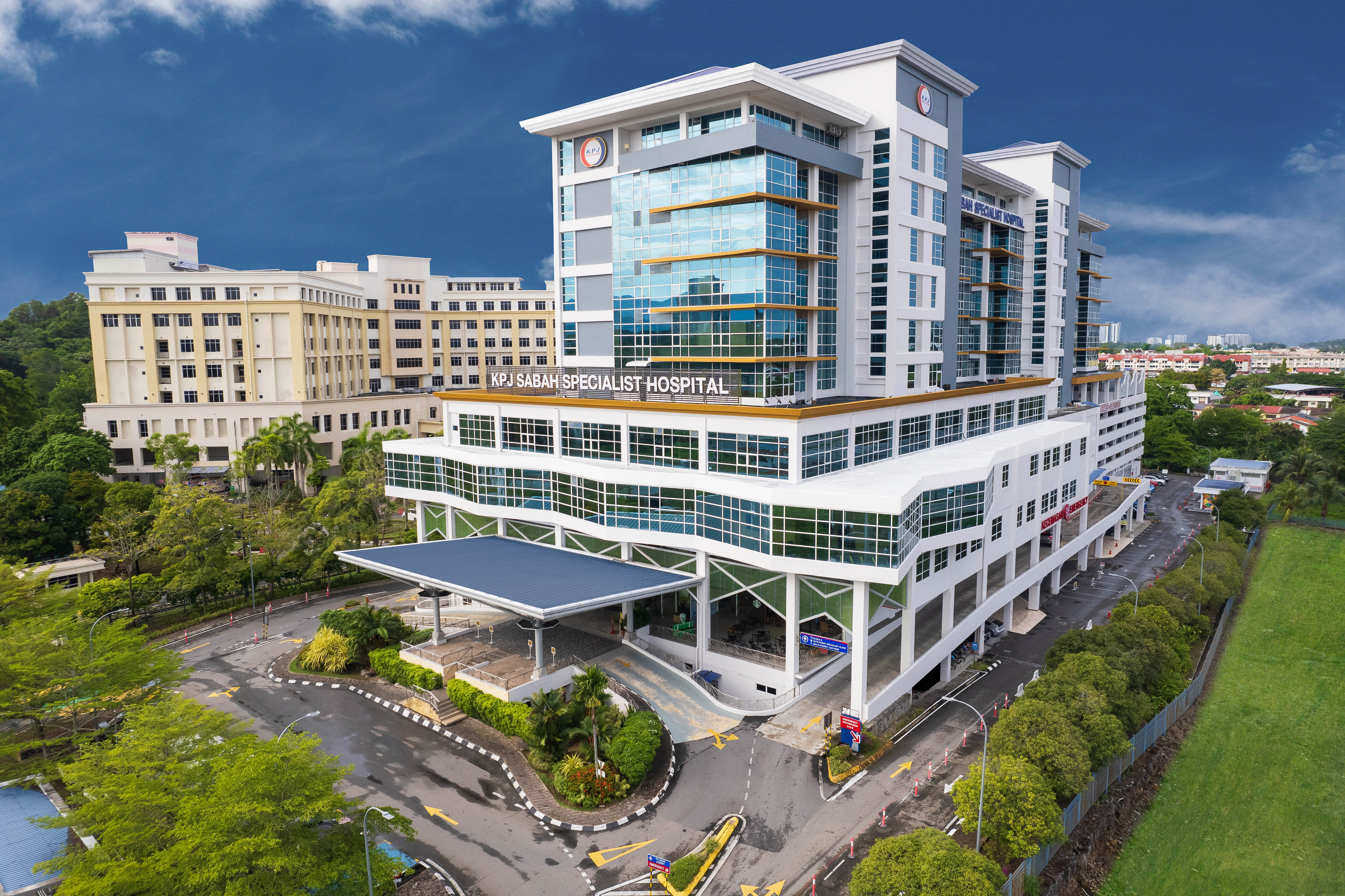

Geography
- Location: Kota Kinabalu, Sabah, Malaysia
- Coordinates: 5°58′1″N 116°5′34″E

Organisation
- Care system: Private hospital
- Funding: For-profit hospital
- Type: District General

Services
- Beds: 245

History
- Opened: 2014

Links
- Website: kpjsabah.com
- Lists: Hospitals in Malaysia

KPJ Sabah Specialist Hospital is a private hospital in the city of Kota Kinabalu, Sabah, Malaysia. The hospital was built in 2012, and started operating in 2014 with a total of 245 beds. It is part of the KPJ Healthcare Berhad network, a Malaysian private healthcare group.

The hospital provides medical services in specialties such as oncology, cardiology, nephrology, maternity care, neurology, and orthopaedics. It also offers rehabilitation services incorporating robotic-assisted technology, including the Hybrid Assistive Limb (HAL), which aids in mobility recovery.

KPJ Sabah Specialist Hospital serves as a health tourism destination, receiving patients from Manado, Indonesia, for specialized medical treatment. The hospital has received various certifications and industry recognitions, including:

- MSQH Accreditation for compliance with Malaysian healthcare quality and safety standards.
- Best Specialized Asia Pacific Hospitals recognition.
- GlobalHealth Awards for achievements in healthcare services.
- Healthcare Asia Awards for contributions to the healthcare industry.
- CXP Best Customer Experience Awards for service quality.
- Sabah Trusted Brand Award for recognition in the state's healthcare sector.

== See also ==
- List of hospitals in Malaysia
