= Mount Miriam Cancer Hospital =

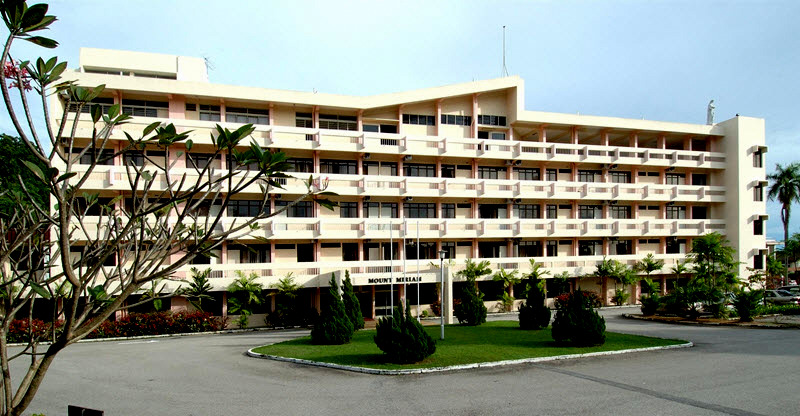

Geography
- Location: 23, Jalan Bulan, 11200 Tanjung Bungah, George Town, Penang, Malaysia
- Coordinates: 5.459058°N 100.301°E

Organisation
- Type: Specialised

Services
- Beds: 40

History
- Founded: 1976

Links
- Website: mountmiriam.com

Mount Miriam Cancer Hospital is a non-profit hospital in George Town within the Malaysian state of Penang. Established in 1976, the 40-bed hospital at Tanjung Bungah offers specialist treatments for cancer patients, including tomotherapy, radiosurgery and chemotherapy.

== History ==
Mount Miriam Cancer Hospital was established by six Catholic nuns of the Franciscan Missionaries of the Divine Motherhood. The construction of the hospital began in 1974 and whilst waiting for the hospital's occupancy certificate, the nuns took the initiative to collect public donations for the project. The hospital was opened in 1976.

Initially, Mount Miriam Cancer Hospital focused on palliative care of late-stage cancer patients. In 1979, the then Chief Ministers of Penang, Lim Chong Eu, declared the opening of its Outpatient Complex and Radiotherapy Unit. Within the year, the hospital also obtained its first radiotherapy machine.

Further developments included the completion of a day chemotherapy unit in 1999 and a palliative outpatient clinic in 2001.

== Services ==
The hospital specialises in cancer treatments, including the following services.

- Tomotherapy
- Stereotactic radiosurgery
- Intensity modulated radiotherapy
- Image-guided radiotherapy
- 3D conformal radiotherapy
- 3D brachytherapy
- Chemotherapy
- Oncology
- Palliative care

== See also ==
- List of hospitals in Malaysia
