= Sultanah Nora Ismail Hospital =

Public hospital in Batu Pahat, Johor, Malaysia

Coordinates: 1°50′15.2″N 102°56′27.6″E

Sultanah Nora Ismail Hospital Batu Pahat Hospital
- Government
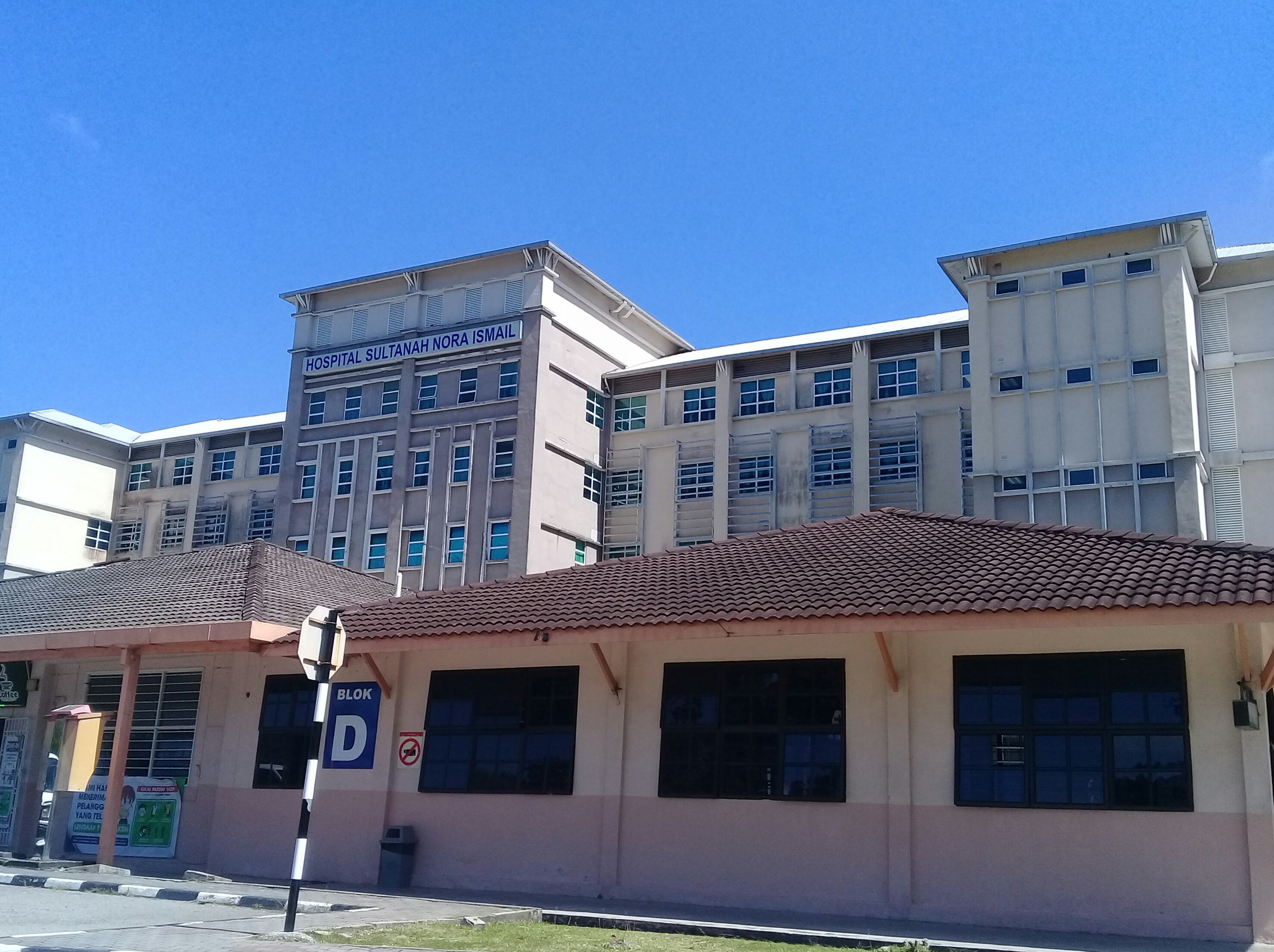

Geography
- Location: Batu Pahat, Johor, Malaysia

Organisation
- Type: District General

Services
- Emergency department: Yes
- Beds: 314

History
- Founded: 1991

Links
- Website: hsni.moh.gov.my/BM/

Sultanah Nora Ismail Hospital or more commonly referred as Batu Pahat Hospital is a government-funded multi-specialty rural general hospital located in Batu Pahat, Johor, Malaysia.

== History ==
Hospital Batu Pahat was built in the Sixth Malaysia Plan in 1991 and initiated the concept of hospital nucleus. Transfer service to the hospital was made on 12 November 1994. From this date, Hospital Batu Pahat has been operating in the scope of patient care services, emergency and outpatient treatment with capacity of 314 beds, which is only a difference of 310 beds in the hospital longer.

Proposed Construction of a block of the new template has been submitted to the Planning Division of the Malaysian Ministry of Health at the end of the Sixth Malaysia Plan is due to differences in the number of beds that are not much different from the old hospital. This situation coupled with the increase of services offered to the patients. Planning and Development Division Ministry of Health visited the hospital in 1995 and saw its own constraints experienced by wards to accommodate the number of patients, particularly medical patients. Finally, additional projects were approved in another template Seventh Malaysia Plan for New Emergency Department and two wards of RM 6.5 million.

Upgrading projects have been approved in the Ninth Malaysia Plan with the addition of 202 beds to accommodate the growing needs of the service. There are about RM200,700,000.00 overall costs. It involved two packages, namely Package A earthworks and Package B works structures. The project was built on the existing site in Hospital Batu Pahat is located at the rear of the hall cafeteria and visitors.

== Change name into formally ==
By the consent of His Majesty, Sultan Ibrahim Ibni Sultan Iskandar, Sultan of Johor the new Hospital Batu Pahat buildings have been officiated by Her Highness Tunku Puan Nora Binti Tunku Panglima Raja Ahmad also named Hospital Batu Pahat as Hospital Sultanah Nora Ismail.

Council was held on 10 October 2012 attended by nearly 500 guests comprising the Johor royal family and dignitaries.

== Transportation ==
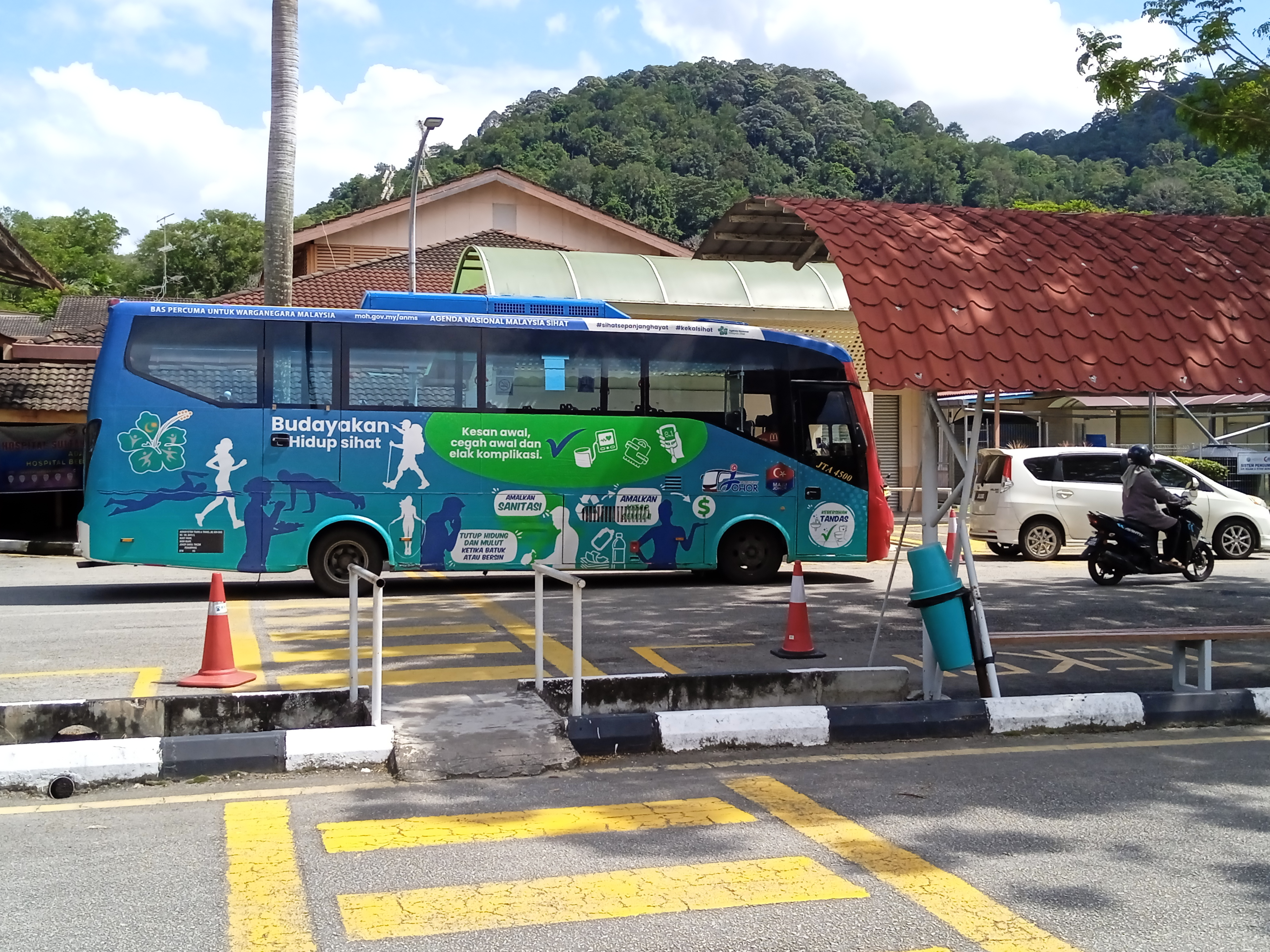
Hospital Sultanah Nora Ismial bus stop

The ares is accessible by Bas Muafakat Johor ("Johor Muafakat Bus") loop route BP-001.

== See also ==
- List of hospitals in Malaysia
