= Lam Wah Ee Nursing College =

College in Penang, Malaysia

Coordinates: 5.3911°N 100.3048°E

- Kolej Kejururawatan Lam Wah Ee (Malay) 南华护士学院 (Chinese)
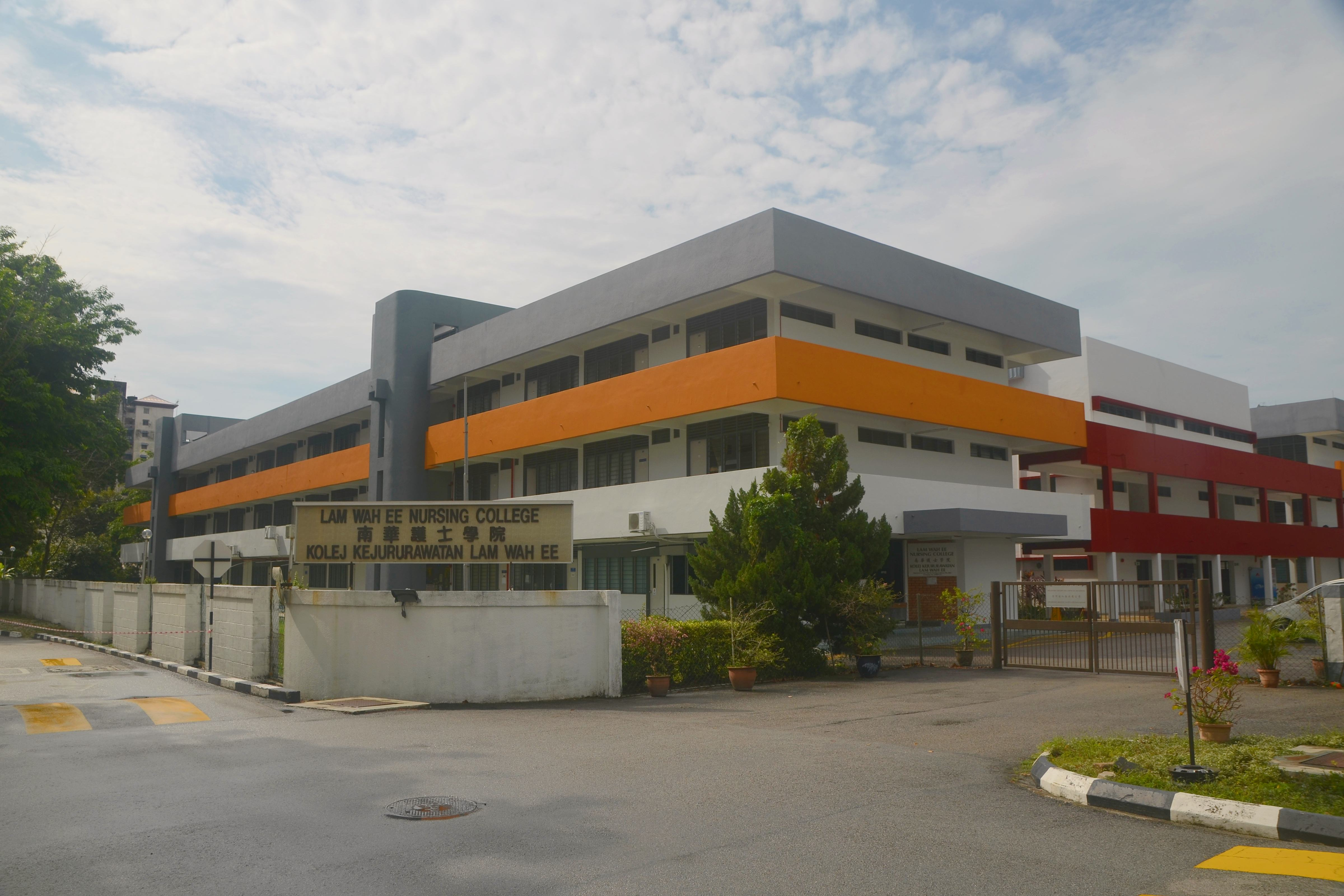
- Lam Wah Ee Nursing College in May 2022
- Motto: To be the centre of excellence for the preparation of safe and caring nurse practitioners
- Type: Private
- Established: 1986; 40 years ago
- Location: George Town, Penang, Malaysia
- Affiliations: Lam Wah Ee Hospital
- Website: www.hlwe.edu.my

Chinese name
- Simplified Chinese: 南华护士学院
- Traditional Chinese: 南華護士學院
Transcriptions
Standard Mandarin
- Hanyu Pinyin: Nánhuá Hùshì Xuéyuàn

Lam Wah Ee Nursing College (LWENC) is a private nursing college located in George Town, Penang, affiliated to Lam Wah Ee Hospital. It is the first private nursing college in northern region of Peninsular Malaysia.

Its three-year diploma in nursing accredited by Malaysian Qualifications Agency, recognized by Malaysian Nursing Board and Ministry of Health Malaysia.

== History ==
Location of Lam Wah Ee Nursing College

Lam Wah Ee Nursing College was started in 1986.

== See also ==
- List of universities in Malaysia
