= Healthcare in Malaysia =

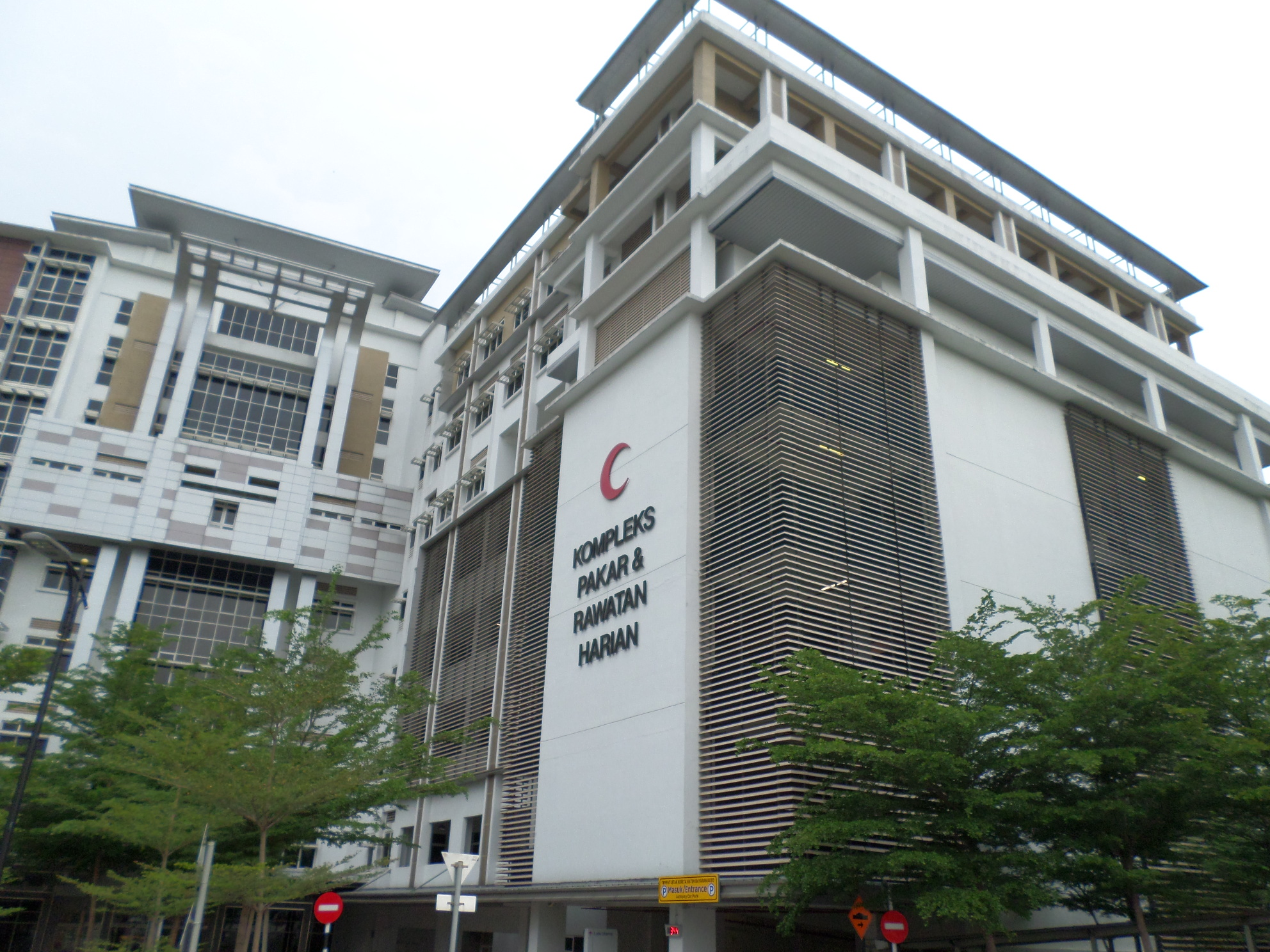
Kuala Lumpur Hospital

Healthcare in Malaysia is under the purview of the Ministry of Health of the Government of Malaysia. Malaysia generally has an efficient and widespread system of health care, operating a two-tier health care system consisting of both a government-run public universal healthcare system along with private healthcare providers. Within the public universal healthcare system, specialist services are either free or have low user fees for procedures (however, appliances are fully self-funded out of pocket by the patient, even within the public healthcare system); as such the public healthcare system suffers from high demand, routine congestion, long wait lists, chronic widespread delays along with persistent shortages in healthcare personnel, medical equipment and healthcare supplies. Therefore, private healthcare providers play a pivotal role in providing specialist consultants and general practitioner (GP) services to the Malaysian population; the private healthcare providers complements or supplants the public healthcare system in terms of availability, types of treatments provided and types of materials used.

Public healthcare in Malaysia is solely funded by general taxation; there are no mandatory national insurance contributions to fund the public universal healthcare system. Due to the issues aforementioned regarding the public universal healthcare system, adoption of private health insurance is widespread among the populace, in order for individuals to pay for the high treatment costs charged at Malaysian private hospitals for medical procedures. Governments from both sides of the political spectrum since under Mahathir Mohamad's time in 1988 has also contemplated on shifting towards a residuals-based system limiting universal coverage only to lower income groups while middle and above classes are relegated to a privatised insurance-based system entirely.

== History ==
Healthcare in Malaysia has undergone radical transformations. Earliest pre-colonial medical care was confined to traditional remedies current among local people. The advent of colonialism brought western medical practice into the country. Since the country's independence in August 1957, the system of medical care transferred from the British colonial rule has been transformed to meet the needs of emerging diseases, as well as national political requirements.

== Healthcare today in Malaysia ==
Development of life expectancy in Malaysia

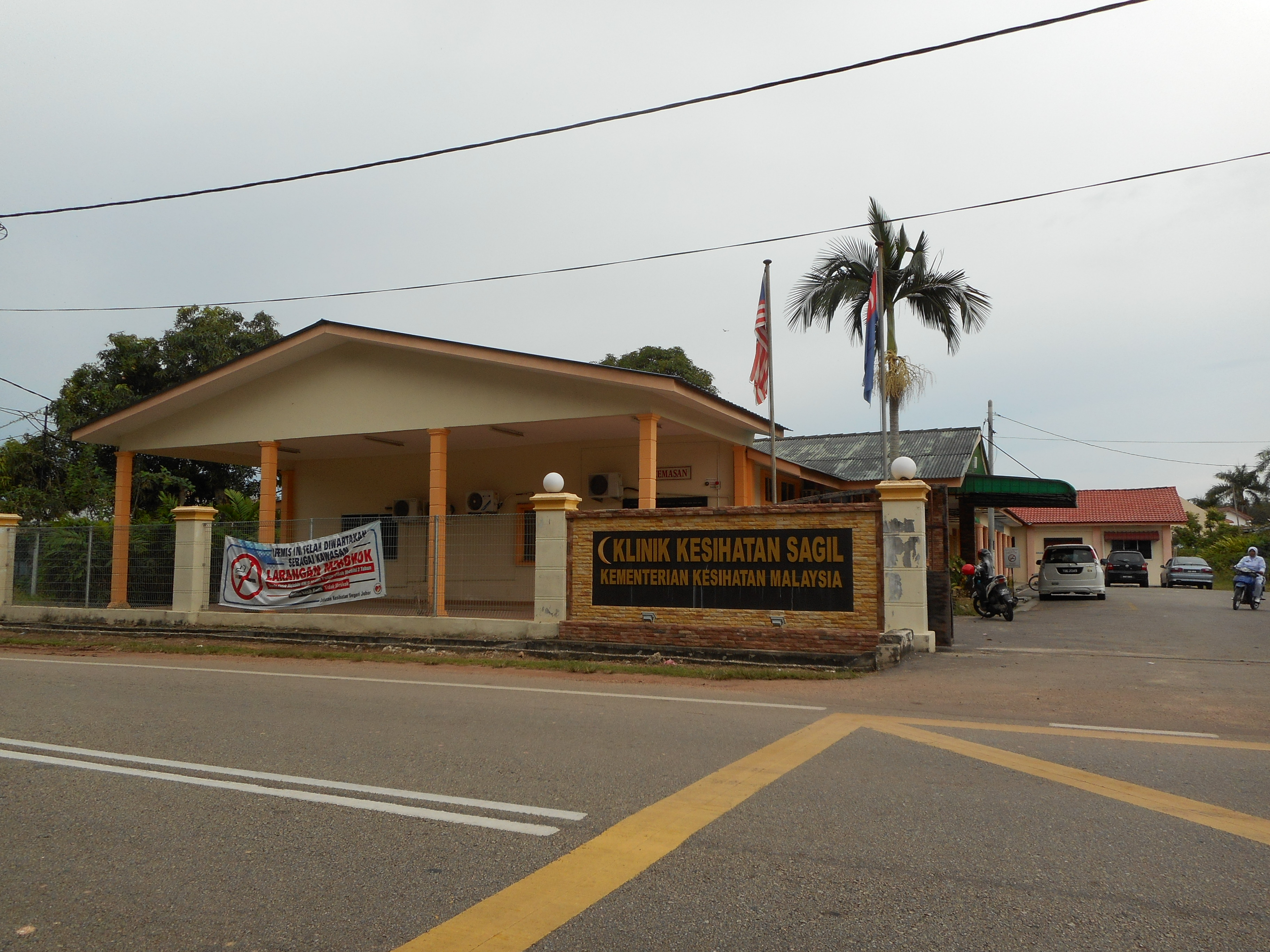
A health clinic in Tangkak District, Johor.

Malaysia has a widespread system of health care. It implements a universal healthcare system, which exists alongside the private healthcare system. Infant mortality rate – a standard in determining the overall efficiency of healthcare – in 2005 was 10, comparing favourably with the United States and western Europe. Life expectancy at birth in 2005 was 74 years. Infant mortality fell from 75 per 1000 live births in 1957 to 7 in 2013.

Healthcare in Malaysia is divided into private and public sectors. Public provision is rather basic, especially in rural areas. The government produced a plan, 1Care for 1Malaysia, in 2009, with the intention of reform based on the principle 'use according to need, pay according to ability', but little progress towards its implementation has been made. Malaysian society places importance on the expansion and development of healthcare, putting 5% of the government social sector development budget into public healthcare, an increase of more than 47% over the previous figure. This has meant an overall increase of more than RM 2 billion. With a rising and ageing population, the Government wishes to improve in many areas including the refurbishment of existing hospitals, building and equipping new hospitals, expansion of the number of polyclinics, and improvements in training and expansion of telehealth. Over the last couple of years, they have increased their efforts to overhaul the systems and attract more foreign investment.

=== Hospitals ===
The government hospitals have the country's best healthcare equipment and facilities apart from having specialists in the field. However, the main drawback is the shortage of staff in public hospitals compare to number of patients seeking treatment has led to long queues. Private hospitals are mostly located at urban areas and are equipped with the latest diagnostic and imaging facilities. Private hospitals were not seen as an ideal investment: it has often taken up to ten years before companies have seen any profits. However, the situation has now changed and companies are now exploring this area again, corresponding with the increased number of foreigners entering Malaysia for medical care and the recent government focus on developing the health tourism industry. The Government has also been trying to promote Malaysia as a health care destination, regionally and internationally.

Foreign doctors are encouraged to apply for employment in Malaysia, especially if they are qualified to a higher level. There is still, however, a significant shortage in the medical workforce, especially of highly trained specialists; thus, certain medical care and treatment are available only in large cities. Recent efforts to bring many facilities to other towns have been hampered by lack of expertise to run the available equipment. As a result, certain medical care and treatment is available only in large cities.

Government agencies have invested heavily in healthcare companies. About a third of private hospital beds are in concerns with government investment.

== Government policy and action ==
The Malaysian government places importance on the expansion and development of health care, putting 5% of the government social sector development budget into public health care—an increase of more than 47% over the previous figure. This has meant an overall increase of more than RM 2 billion. With a rising and ageing population, the Government wishes to improve in many areas including the refurbishment of existing hospitals, building and equipping new hospitals, expansion of the number of polyclinics, and improvements in training and expansion of telehealth. A major problem with the health care sector is the lack of medical centres for rural areas, which the government is trying to counter through the development of and expansion of a system called "tele-primary care". Another issue is the overprescription of drugs, though this has decreased in recent years. Over the last couple of years, the Malaysian Health Ministry has increased its efforts to overhaul the system and attract more foreign investment.

There is also an initiative by the Malaysian government to provide 1 Malaysia Clinic, a government based clinic that is free for all citizens. The medicine are usually cheap while consultations are free.

In 2024, the Ministry of Health announced plans to set up a technical working group called the Health Transformation Office (HTO) to oversee the implementation of healthcare sector reforms in the country, as outlined under the Health White Paper, particularly in digital health transformation and health financing reforms. The Health White Paper was released in 2023, covering four key areas:

- Transforming healthcare service delivery;
- Enhancing health promotion and disease prevention at all levels;
- Ensuring sustainable and equitable healthcare financing; and,
- Strengthening the foundation and governance of the healthcare system.

=== Elderly care ===
Malaysia's elderly population is growing rapidly. The Department of Statistics Malaysia reported that persons aged 65 and above constituted 7.4% of the total population in the 2020 census, with the proportion of those aged 60 and above estimated at approximately 10.4% by 2023. Malaysia is projected to cross the 15% threshold that defines an "ageing nation" in the early 2030s.

Private elderly care facilities in Malaysia are regulated by two bodies. The Jabatan Kebajikan Masyarakat (Department of Social Welfare, JKM) registers private homes for the elderly — known as Pusat Jagaan Warga Emas — under the Care Centres Act 1993 (Act 506). Separately, the Ministry of Health Malaysia licenses private nursing homes that provide clinical nursing care under the Private Healthcare Facilities and Services Act 1998.

Cross-border eldercare has emerged as a distinct segment along the Singapore–Johor corridor, where monthly fees at registered nursing homes in Johor Bahru are substantially lower than equivalent care in Singapore, attracting Singaporean families seeking affordable residential care for elderly relatives.

=== Influenza ===
The Malaysian government has developed a National Influenza Pandemic Preparedness Plan (NIPPP) which serves as a time bound guide for preparedness and response plan for influenza pandemic. It provides a policy and strategic framework for a multisectoral response and contains specific advice and actions to be undertaken by the Ministry of Health at the different levels, other governmental departments and agencies and non-governmental organisations to ensure that resources are mobilised and used most efficiently before, during and after a pandemic episode. Since the Nipah virus outbreak in 1999, the Malaysian Health Ministry have put in place processes to be better prepared to protect the Malaysian population from the threat of infectious diseases. Malaysia was fully prepared during the Severe Acute Respiratory Syndrome (SARS) situation (Malaysia was not a SARS affected country) and the episode of the H5N1 (bird flu) outbreak in 2004.

=== Medicine via Post ===
In January 2011 the Malaysia government launched a program to renew prescriptions via mail. Medicine via Post targets patients with chronic diseases. To be eligible to participate patients have to receive a certification from a pharmacist that their condition is stable and that they understand how to properly use their medication. Patients pay delivery costs which are RM3.5 in Putrajaya, RM5.0 for other locations in Peninsular Malaysia, and RM8.0 for Sabah and Sarawak. The program is based on a pilot-project conducted at Putrajaya Hospital started in October 2009.

== Medical education ==
The Malaysian Medical Council currently oversees the medical profession in Malaysia. There are both public and private medical schools in Malaysia. Medical training takes usually 5 years. Newly graduated doctors are required to perform at least 4 years, including 2 years of housemanship (internship before becoming a fully qualified general practitioner) and 2 years compulsory government service, in public hospitals throughout the nation, thus ensuring adequate coverage of medical needs for the general population.

== See also ==
- Health in Malaysia
- Medical tourism in Malaysia
