= Patients Beyond Borders =

Patients Beyond Borders Third Edition
- Author: Josef Woodman
- Country: United States
- Language: English
- Genre: Medical Tourism
- Publisher: Healthy Travel Media
- Published: 2006–2011
- Media type: Print

Patients Beyond Borders is a 2015 medical tourism guidebook by Josef Woodman.

== Overview ==
The book surveys the economic and social trends associated with medical travel and provides information on medical travel destinations, internationally accredited hospitals and corresponding medical specialties, subspecialties and procedures.

Patients Beyond Borders has been cited by mainstream press organizations as a leading guidebook for medical tourism. Data on international patient flow and comparative costs of medical procedures have been cited by research, news and reference media.

== Content ==
This chapter summary provides a rough indication of the book's contents:

- Foreword: Jeremy Abbate, Publisher, Scientific American Worldview.
- Introduction: Definition and overview of medical tourism; why patients travel for care, most-traveled destinations; comparative treatment costs.
- Part One: What medical travelers should know; how to vet international doctors, surgeons and facilities; accreditation overview; travel cautions; post-op care; medical travel facilitators.
- Part Two: Most visited hospitals and their specialties. An overview of 150 hospitals in 22 countries offering international healthcare services.
- Part Three: Resources and References.

== Editions ==
- Josef Woodman. Patients Beyond Borders: Third Edition. 2015 ISBN 978-0-9846095-8-1
- Josef Woodman. Patients Beyond Borders: Taiwan Edition Simplified Chinese Translation. 2013 ISBN 978-0-9903154-0-7
- Josef Woodman. Patients Beyond Borders: Dubai Healthcare City Edition. 2012 ISBN 978-0-9846095-2-9
- Josef Woodman. Patients Beyond Borders: Monterrey, Mexico Edition. 2012 ISBN 978-0-9846095-0-5
- Josef Woodman. Patients Beyond Borders: Turkey Edition. 2010 ISBN 978-0-9823361-1-3
- Josef Woodman. Patients Beyond Borders: Malaysia Edition. 2009 ISBN 978-0-9791079-5-5
- Josef Woodman. Patients Beyond Borders: Singapore Edition. 2009 ISBN 978-0-9791079-7-9
- Josef Woodman. Patients Beyond Borders: Thailand Edition. 2009 ISBN 978-0-9823361-2-0
- Josef Woodman. Patients Beyond Borders: Taiwan Edition. 2008 ISBN 978-0-9791079-3-1
- Josef Woodman. Patients Beyond Borders: 2nd Edition. 2008. ISBN 978-0-9791079-2-4
- Josef Woodman. Patients Beyond Borders: Singapore Edition (Arabic Translation). 2008.
- Josef Woodman. Patients Beyond Borders: Korea Edition. 2006 ISBN 978-0-9791079-8-6
