= List of medical schools in Malaysia =

Medical Schools in Malaysia generally offer a five-year undergraduate program for future doctors. It is compulsory for newly graduated students to work in governmental hospitals under the housemanship program (also called internship) for a duration of at least two years that combines service and training roles. Internship may be longer at the discretion of each trainee supervisor regarding their knowledge, skills, competency and attitude in each particular discipline, but the total duration of the internship training should not exceed six years At the end of their internship and upon being given full registration as a doctor, every practitioner has to serve a minimum continuous period of two years within the public services upon according to section 40 of the Malaysian Medical Act 1971. As defined under Article 132 of the Federal Constitution, this service may be completed in a government healthcare facility, the Ministry of Health, or other government agencies as determined by the Director General of Health.

== Admissions ==
Entry to the public medical schools is very competitive. Courses last five or six years. Two years of pre-clinical training in an academic environment and three years clinical training at a teaching hospital. The medical program is usually divided into three phases. Phase 1 consists of the first two years of the programme involving integrated teaching and learning of the relevant basic medical sciences. Phase II (Year 3) and Phase III (Year 4 and Year 5) involve clinical skills development and subsequently consolidation of clinical clerkship in the various clinical disciplines.

Medical schools and teaching hospitals are closely integrated. Entry requirements are basically based on Sijil Tinggi Persekolahan Malaysia (STPM), Malaysian Matriculation Programme, GCE A Level, International Baccalaureate (IB), Foundation in Science programme, Diploma in Health Sciences or Unified Examination Certificate.

== Current medical schools ==
State	School	City	Est	Degree	Type	Teaching Hospital	Notes
Kuala Lumpur	Faculty of Medicine, University of Malaya	Pantai Dalam	1905	MBBS	Public	University Malaya Medical Centre	Oldest and highest-ranked medical school in Malaysia
Kuala Lumpur	Faculty of Medicine, National University of Malaysia	Cheras	1972	MD	Public	Universiti Kebangsaan Malaysia Medical Centre	Second-oldest medical school in Malaysia
Kelantan	Faculty of Medicine, Universiti Sains Malaysia	Kubang Kerian	1979	MD	Public	Universiti Sains Malaysia Hospital	Third-oldest medical school in Malaysia
Sarawak	Universiti Malaysia Sarawak Faculty of Medicine and Health Sciences	Kuching	1995	MD	Public		
Selangor	Universiti Putra Malaysia Faculty of Medicine and Health Sciences.	Serdang	1996	MD	Public	University Putra Malaysia Teaching Hospital	
Pulau Pinang	Royal College of Surgeons in Ireland and University College Dublin Malaysia Campus	George Town	1996	MB BCh BAO	Private	Penang General Hospital	Wholly owned by RCSI & UCD and medical students complete 2.5 years pre-clinical studies in Ireland at either RCSI or UCD.
Pahang	International Islamic University Malaysia Kulliyyah of Medicine	Kuantan	1997	MBBS	Public	IIUM Medical Centre	
Melaka	Manipal University College Malaysia (formerly Melaka Manipal Medical College)	Bukit Baru	1997	MBBS	Private		Partnership with Manipal University
Kuala Lumpur	International Medical University	Bukit Jalil	1999	MBBS	Private		
Perak	Universiti Kuala Lumpur Royal College Medicine of Perak	Ipoh	1999	MBBS	Private		
Kedah	AIMST University Faculty of Medicine	Bedong	2002	MBBS	Private		
Selangor	Universiti Teknologi MARA Faculty of Medicine	Sungai Buloh	2003	MBBS	Public	UiTM Teaching Hospital Puncak Alam	
Sabah	Universiti Malaysia Sabah Faculty of Medicine and Health Sciences	Kota Kinabalu	2003	MD	Public	University Malaysia Sabah Hospital	
Pulau Pinang	Allianze University College of Medical Sciences	Kepala Batas	2004	MD	Private		Closed down due to bankruptcy
Selangor	University of Cyberjaya Faculty of Medicine	Cyberjaya	2005	MBBS	Private		
Negeri Sembilan	UCSI University Faculty of Medicine and Health Sciences	Port Dickson	2005	MD	Private		The five-year M.D. programme is based at the UCSI University Bandar Springhill Campus.
Kuala Lumpur	Monash University School of Medicine and Health Sciences	Bandar Sunway	2005	MD	Private		
Kuala Lumpur	Universiti Sains Islam Malaysia Faculty of Medicine and Health Sciences	Pandan Indah	2006	MBBS	Public		
Selangor	Management & Science University International Medical School	Shah Alam	2006	MBBS	Private		
Terengganu	University Sultan Zainal Abidin Faculty of Medicine	Kuala Terengganu	2009	MBBS	Public	Universiti Sultan Zainal Abidin Teaching Hospital	
Kuala Lumpur	National Defence University of Malaysia Faculty of Medicine and Defence Health	Sungai Besi	2009	MD	Public		
Kuala Lumpur	MAHSA University Faculty of Medicine	Cheras	2009	MBBS	Private		
Johor	Newcastle University Medicine Malaysia	Iskandar	2009	MBBS	Private		
Selangor	SEGi University Faculty of Medicine	Kota Damansara	2010	MBBS	Private		
Selangor	Universiti Tunku Abdul Rahman Faculty of Medicine and Health Sciences (FMHS)	Sungai Long	2010	MBBS	Private		
Selangor	Taylor's University School of Medicine	Subang Jaya	2010	MBBS	Private		
Johor	Asia Metropolitan University Faculty of Medicine	Johor Bahru	2010	MBBS	Private		
Kuala Lumpur	Perdana University Graduate School of Medicine	Damansara Heights	2011	MD	Private		First and only medical school in Malaysia to provide a 4-year Graduate Entry Medicine program
Selangor	Lincoln University College Faculty of Medicine	Petaling Jaya	2011	MD	Private		
Pahang	Widad University College Faculty of Medicine	Kuantan	2012	MBBS	Private		
Perak	Quest International University Perak Faculty of Medicine	Ipoh	2012	MBBS	Private		
Kedah	Universiti Islam Antarabangsa Sultan Abdul Halim Mua'dzam Shah Kulliyyah of Medicine and Health Sciences	Kuala Ketil	2012	MBBS	Private		UniSHAMS was formerly known as INSANIAH University College (KUIN). KUIN was established under the State Enactment No 4 of 1995. Wholly owned and managed by Kedah State Government. His Royal Highness Tuanku Sultan Kedah is the Chancellor and YAB Menteri Besar Kedah is the chairman for the board of directors.
Selangor	Sunway University School of Medical and Life Sciences	Bandar Sunway	2024	MD	Private		
