= Gleneagles Hospital (disambiguation) =

Gleneagles Hospital is a hospital in Singapore.

Gleneagles Hospital may also be referred to other similarly named hospitals established under the Gleneagles brand that IHH Healthcare and its subsidiary, Parkway Pantai, manage:

- Hong Kong - Gleneagles Hospital Hong Kong
- India - Gleneagles Global Hospitals
- Malaysia
  - Gleneagles Hospital Kuala Lumpur
  - Gleneagles Hospital Penang
