= King Edward VII Memorial Hospital building, Penang =

King Edward VII Memorial Hospital
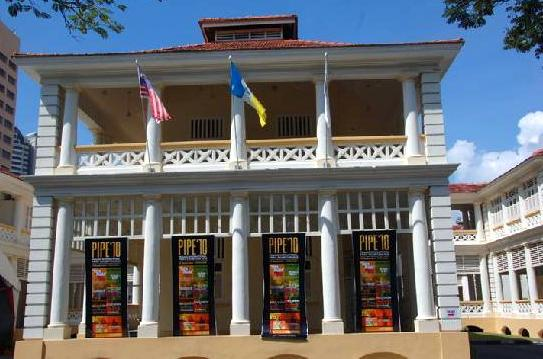
- The former King Edward VII Memorial Hospital

Geography
- Location: Macalister Road, George Town, Penang, Malaysia

Organisation
- Type: Maternity

History
- Opened: 1915
- Closed: c. 1955

The King Edward VII Memorial Hospital building is situated in Macalister Road, George Town, Penang, Malaysia. When it opened in 1915 it was the first maternity hospital in Penang, and only the second such hospital on the Malay Peninsula after Singapore. It closed in the 1950s when a new hospital was completed in George Town, and has since been used for different purposes including, from 2017, as a temporary museum.

== History ==
The idea for the establishment of a maternity hospital in Penang was conceived following the death of King Edward VII in 1910. Throughout the British Empire, it was proposed that suitable memorials be erected in his honour, and Penang was invited by the British administration in Singapore to contribute funds. Instead, members of the Penang community decided to create their own memorial, and approached the Municipal Commission, headed by William Peel, its president, with a proposal for the creation Penang's first maternity hospital. The nearest maternity hospital was in Singapore, and the region suffered from high rates of infant mortality due to most women not having the help of trained nurses.

Peel agreed to the idea and in 1911 established a committee to find a suitable site and organise fund raising. The following year, land on Macalister Road was secured by an indenture, dated 5 February 1912, executed in favour of Peel, as President of the Municipal Commission, and William Evans, Resident Councillor, who agreed to hold the land in trust for charitable purposes. The committee for the maternity hospital decided that it needed $100,000, and invited public subscriptions, raising $94,677 via 600 donors. The largest donor was leading businessman and member of the Legislative Council, August Huttenbach who, together with his brother, were credited with the success of the fundraising efforts. Designs for the hospital were invited, and Stark and McNeill's was chosen, with Robert Young appointed as contractors.

On 11 September 1915, the maternity hospital was completed, and formally opened at a ceremony officiated by Alfred Bryant, Resident Councillor, and named the King Edward VII Memorial Hospital. In October, on a petition of the Municipal Commissioners, the Supreme Court formerly confirmed their appointment as trustees. An advisory committee was then established to manage it consisting of two government nominees (the First Magistrate and the Collector of Land Revenue), two municipal nominees (the President and the Health Officer), and three other members chosen by them. Expenses of maintaining the hospital were shared between the Municipality and the Government.

When the hospital opened, it had around 50 beds, no resident doctors or midwives, but medical practitioners agreed to work free of charge attending to the poorer patients. Wealthy patients brought their own doctors and paid for beds in the first class section. The first matron was a Miss Macdonald, and later, Dr. George W. Park became the hospital's first full-time obstetrician who stayed until 1917.

The number of patients steadily increased and in 1922, at the request of the Municipality, the Government took over the management of the hospital whilst the Municipal commissioners continued as trustees. Admissions in the early 1920s had risen to over 600 per year. For 1923, of the 4,257 births registered in Penang, 651 were from the hospital.

It continued as the main maternity hospital in Penang until the 1950s when a new hospital was completed in Residency Road. After it closed, the building was occupied by the St. John's Ambulance and the Red Crescent Society. Later, it was used as a training centre for adult education, and occupied by various non-profit and private organisations.

Beginning in 2017, the building was used by the Penang State Museum as temporary exhibition space pending the completion of the refurbishment of its site in Farquhar Street. Expected to take three years, works were delayed due to the COVID-19 pandemic and were expected to be completed in 2024.
