= Gleneagles =

Gleneagles may refer to:

- Glen Eagles, a valley in Scotland
- Gleneagles Hotel, Auchterarder, Scotland
  - Gleneagles Agreement, signed and held at the Gleneagles Hotel
  - The 31st G8 summit held in July 2005 at Gleneagles Hotel, Scotland
  - Gleneagles railway station, serving both Gleneagles and Auchterarder
- Gleneagles Hotel, Torquay, England, the inspiration for Fawlty Towers
- Gleneagles, a neighbourhood in West Vancouver, British Columbia, Canada
  - Gleneagles Elementary School in West Vancouver, British Columbia, Canada
- The Gleneagles, a historic apartment building in Montreal, Quebec, Canada
- Gleneagles (horse), a thoroughbred racehorse
- Gleneagles Golf Course, Twinsburg, Ohio, USA

== See also ==
- Gleneagle (disambiguation)
- Gleneagles Hospital (disambiguation)
