= GKL =

GKL may refer to:

- Gleneagles Kuala Lumpur
- IATA code for Great Keppel Island Airport, on Great Keppel Island, Queensland, Australia
