= St. George's Girls' School =

- Sekolah Menengah Kebangsaan (P) St. George (Malay)
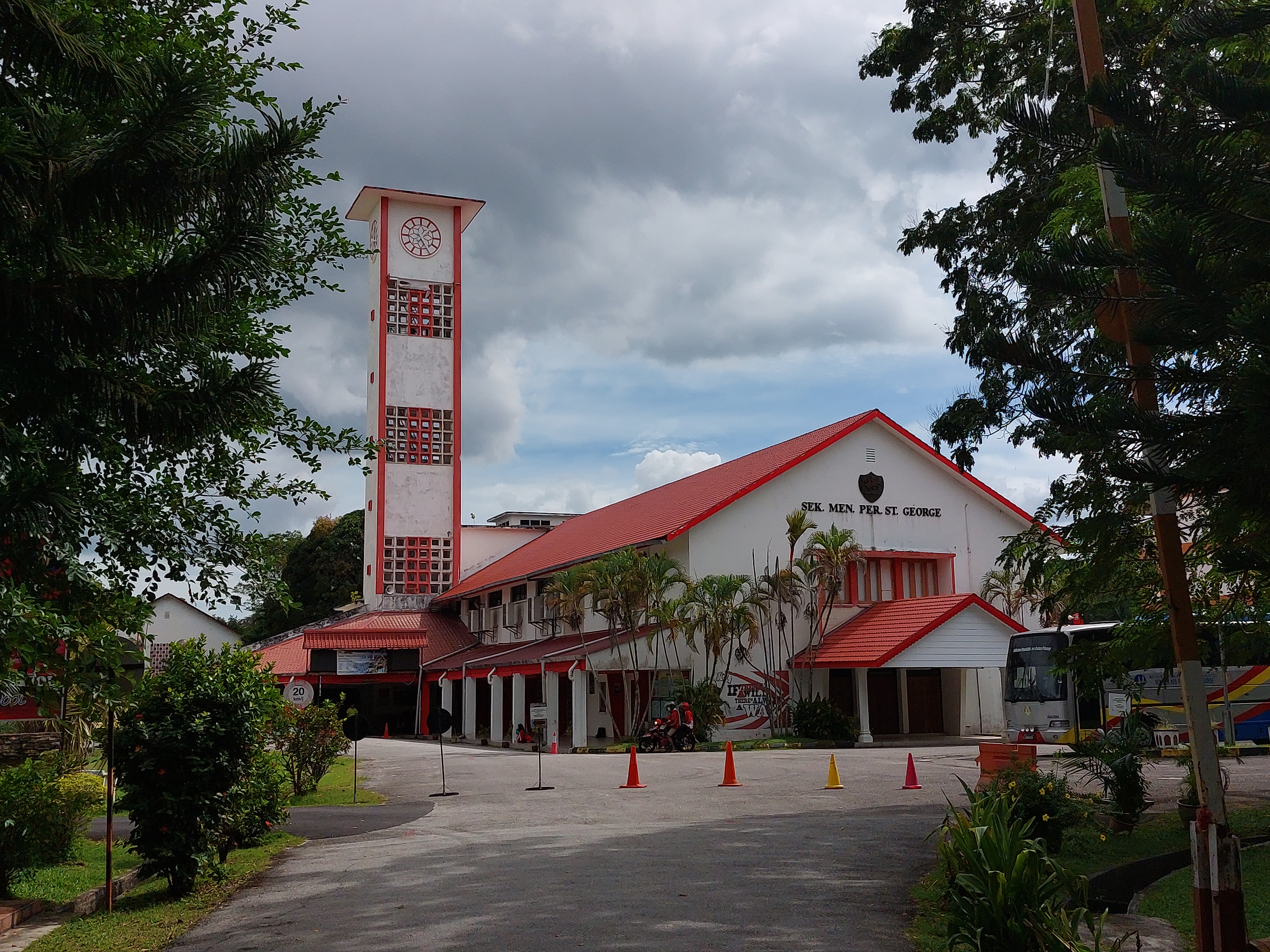
- St. Georges Girls' School, September 2022.

Location
- Macalister Road, George Town, Penang, 10450; Malaysia; 5.42233°N 100.307946°E

Information
- Type: All-girls secondary school
- Motto: Latin: Aut viam inveniam aut faciam (If There's a Will, There's Always a Way)
- Religious affiliation: Secular
- Denomination: None
- Established: 1885; 141 years ago
- Grades: Form 1 - 5
- Gender: Female
- Enrollment: ~1300
- Colours: Red and white
- Abbreviation: SGGS
- Website: www.smkpstgeorge.edu.my

St. George's Girls' School, officially the St. George's Girls' National Secondary School (Malay: Sekolah Menengah Kebangsaan (Perempuan) St. George) is an all-girls secondary school in George Town, Penang, Malaysia. Originally established in 1885, it is notable for its academic achievements and notable alumnae from different racial, ethnic and cultural backgrounds, leading to its inclusion in the Malaysian Ministry of Education's Cluster School and High Performance School systems. The school is academically selective, accepting only the top ten percentile of students from a number of primary schools, including Islands Girls' School, Northam Road Primary Girls' School, and Residency Road Girls' School. The teaching curriculum and environment is secular, making it popular with students from diverse racial, ethnic and/or religious affiliations. School facilities include well-equipped science laboratories, athletic field tracks, tennis courts, gymnasium for gymnastic training, and school canteen where students can buy inexpensive meals.

== History ==
The history of St. George's Girls School stretches back to 1884, when Mrs. Biggs, wife of the British colonial chaplain, Rev. Louis Biggs, began conducting informal classes at their residence at Farquhar Street. The following year, St. George's Girls School was formally established with R.A. Shackleford becoming the school's first principal. The school was so named by Rev. Biggs, the colonial chaplain at Penang's first Anglican church, after St. George, the martyr, who was the patron saint of England (as well as of a number of other kingdoms, including Catalonia, Ethiopia, Greece and Palestine).

In 1909, the government assumed responsibility over the operation of St. George's, renaming it the Government Girls' School, providing purely secular education, with no religious instruction or teaching of morals. However, the school reverted to its original name in 1928, presumably out of custom and habit, as the Anglican church did not reassert control over it. In 1911, the school was moved to Northam Road, and further expansion occurred with the acquisition of two bungalows. For a short time, boys also attended St. George's, likely due to the school inspector's report of overcrowding in the boys' schools on the island. A brief coeducational experiment was started in 1916 and abandoned as unsuccessful in 1920, with St. George's remaining an all-girls establishment.

The decade after World War I was a benchmark in the evolution of the educational curriculum which originally consisted of reading, writing and mathematics, and the expansion of extra-curricular activities. In 1922, the first physical education classes were held at the school, during an era when no man was allowed to watch girls playing games or doing physical exercise. Although St. George's exemplar of a girls' education gained a foothold, underlying social attitudes took much longer to change. In July 1934, a debate was held under the auspices of the Penang Teachers' Association on the topic "Women's Place is in the Home". The redoubtable B.H. Oon who was Malaya's first female barrister, argued the example of Queen Victoria as both a ruler as well as a homemaker and Amy Johnson as a female pioneer in aviation, but lost the motion by a vote of 57 to 18. Later, Mrs. Oon would take up the fight to secure federal funds for the rebuilding of her alma mater after World War II, against the objections of the Chief Minister of Perak who objected to the $1.6 million rebuilding grant for St. George's. During the reconstruction after the war, the students worked hard to restore the school's reputation, achieving 100% pass rate in the Cambridge examinations, for 1946, 1947 and 1948.

In 1954, St. George's Girls School was shifted once more, this time to its present grounds at Macalister Road. As an indication of the school's role in leading the quiet revolution that took place in the social attitudes of the country, St. George's had an all-female football team that traveled to Parit Buntar in 1961, to play in a charity football match in aid of the World Refugee Fund, astonishing the residents of the sleepy town of Perak who saw women playing football for the first time. The football team no longer exists, but students can choose to participate in handball, netball, badminton, gymnastics, table tennis, tennis and fencing, with hockey, golf and archery being popular choices.

The original school uniform previously used to be white with red trimmings, but in the 1970s students started wearing the national school uniform colors of turquoise and white as part of the national education policy of the Malaysian government for publicly operated girls secondary schools.

St. George's Girls School was named one of the Cluster Schools by Malaysia's Ministry of Education in 2008, as well as being listed as one of the country's High Performance Schools in 2010. The school is part of the country's diversified and functioning public school system, which includes government schools, convent schools, and vernacular schools, which all receive some form of funding assistance from the Malaysian government to meet its national objectives of compulsory education for school-age children, universal literacy and workforce preparation. Due to the Ministry of Education's emphases on early preparation of science education starting at the high school level, the national supply of local medical graduates (resulting in 1 doctor for every 454 persons in the country in 2020, which exceeded the World Health Organization's recommendation of 1 doctor for every 500 persons), has exceeded the number of permanent employment positions available in the country's public healthcare system.

== Notable alumni ==
- Tuanku Bainun - former Queen of Malaysia (1989–1994) and of the State of Perak (1984–2014)
- Eva Lee Kwok - Canadian businesswoman and investor
- Faridah Merican - actress, and founder of KLPac and PenangPac
- Harbans Kaur Virik - Malaysia's first qualified pediatrician
- Helen Chuah - former Mayor of Colchester in the United Kingdom (2011–2012)
- Judy Cheng-Hopkins - United Nations Secretary-General's Special Adviser on the University for Peace
- Khoo Salma Nasution - Penang heritage activist, author and former councillor in the Penang Island City Council (2017–2019)
- Ooi Chean See - Malaysia's first female orchestra conductor
- Oon Beng Hong (née Lim) - first woman admitted to the Malayan Bar in 1927, first ethnic Chinese woman to be called into the English Bar
- Shahrizat Abdul Jalil - former Malaysian Minister of Women, Family and Community Development
- Khaw Choon Ean - first Malaysian woman appointed a Federation International de Gymnastique judge (1985–99) who pioneered the teaching of rhythmic gymnastics in schools throughout Malaysia
- Yeohlee Teng - American fashion designer
- Zaiton Othman - athlete and sports psychologist
