= R. Ravi Kumar =

Indian heart surgeon

- Known for: World’s First Robotic Double Valve Replacement, 2011. World’s first Robotic combined Mitral Valve Replacement and CABG, 2011. India’s first Robotic Aortic Valve Replacement, 2010. India’s first Robotic Mitral Valve Replacement, 2006.
- Medical career
- Profession: Surgeon
- Sub-specialties: Cardiovascular surgery

R. Ravi Kumar is an Indian cardiac surgeon known for his work in robot-assisted cardiac surgery. He has been associated with several medical institutions in Chennai, including Chettinad Health City and MGM Hospital.

== Education ==
R Ravi Kumar graduated from Stanley Medical College and obtained the FRCS from Edinburgh. He worked at the Harefield Hospital in the UK under Magdi Yacoub, involving himself with adult cardiac surgery including heart and lung transplant and aortic homografts. Kumar then underwent surgical residency in Boston in the United States. Following this he worked with Albert Starr in Portland, Oregon. He pursued his cardiothoracic residency at the University of Texas, South Western Medical Center in Dallas, Texas. He continued at the same institution as an advanced fellow in Heart & Lung Transplant and is UNOS (United Network for Organ Sharing), certifiable for Heart & Lung Transplant. He is a surgeon with American Board Certification in General Surgery and Cardiac Surgery who is also UNOS certifiable for heart and lung transplantation and ventricular assist devices.

== Career ==
By 2010 and as of 2011, he was director of the Institute of Cardiovascular Disease, Robotic Surgery Center at the Chettinad Health City. By April 2014, he was senior interventional cardiologist at Global Health City in Chennai. In May 2016, he led a team of doctors at Chettinad Health City in performing the first robotic-assisted double valve replacement heart surgery.

In 2019, he was senior transplant cardiologist at The Gleneagles Global Hospital Chennai, and associate director of the Heart and Lung Transplantation Institute. He was senior consultant and clinical lead of the Cardiology and Heart Failure Programme at MGM Healthcare in early 2022.

=== Specialties ===
Kumar has done varied robotic heart surgical procedures like: robotic mitral valve repair and replacement, adult ASD closures, aortic valve replacement, double valve replacement and CABG. His areas of special interest are, all types of adult heart surgery, robot-assisted heart surgery, pulmonary thromboendarterectomy for chronic pulmonary thrombo-embolic disease, aortic aneurysm repair, surgery for cardiac failure, heart and lung transplant and ventricular assist device.

=== Achievements ===
- India's first Robotic Mitral Valve Replacement, 2006. Heart surgeons at CARE Hospital here have replaced the mitral valve in the fist-sized muscular organ of a 23-year-old patient using Da Vinci Surgical System.
- India's first Robotic Aortic Valve Replacement, 2010. 18-year-old patient with complaints of palpitations, chest discomfort, chest pain on exertion. Patient had aortic valve stenosis (shrunk) and regurgitation (leak) with reduced pumping of the heart. He underwent robotic aortic valve replacement.
- World's First Robotic Double Valve Replacement, 2011. 23-year-old male who had chest discomfort, shortness of breath and palpitations for 4 years. Had mitral valve stenosis (shrunk) and regurgitation (leaking) and aortic valve stenosis (shrunk). Had robotic double valve replacement.
- World's first Robotic combined Mitral Valve Replacement and CABG, 2011. 66-year-old man with complaints of chest pain and shortness of breath. Patient had coronary artery disease and severe mitral valve leak. Patient had combined robotic mitral valve replacement and coronary artery bypass surgery.

== See also ==
- Healthcare in Chennai
