= Farquhar Street, George Town =

Road in the Malaysian state of Penang

Farquhar Street
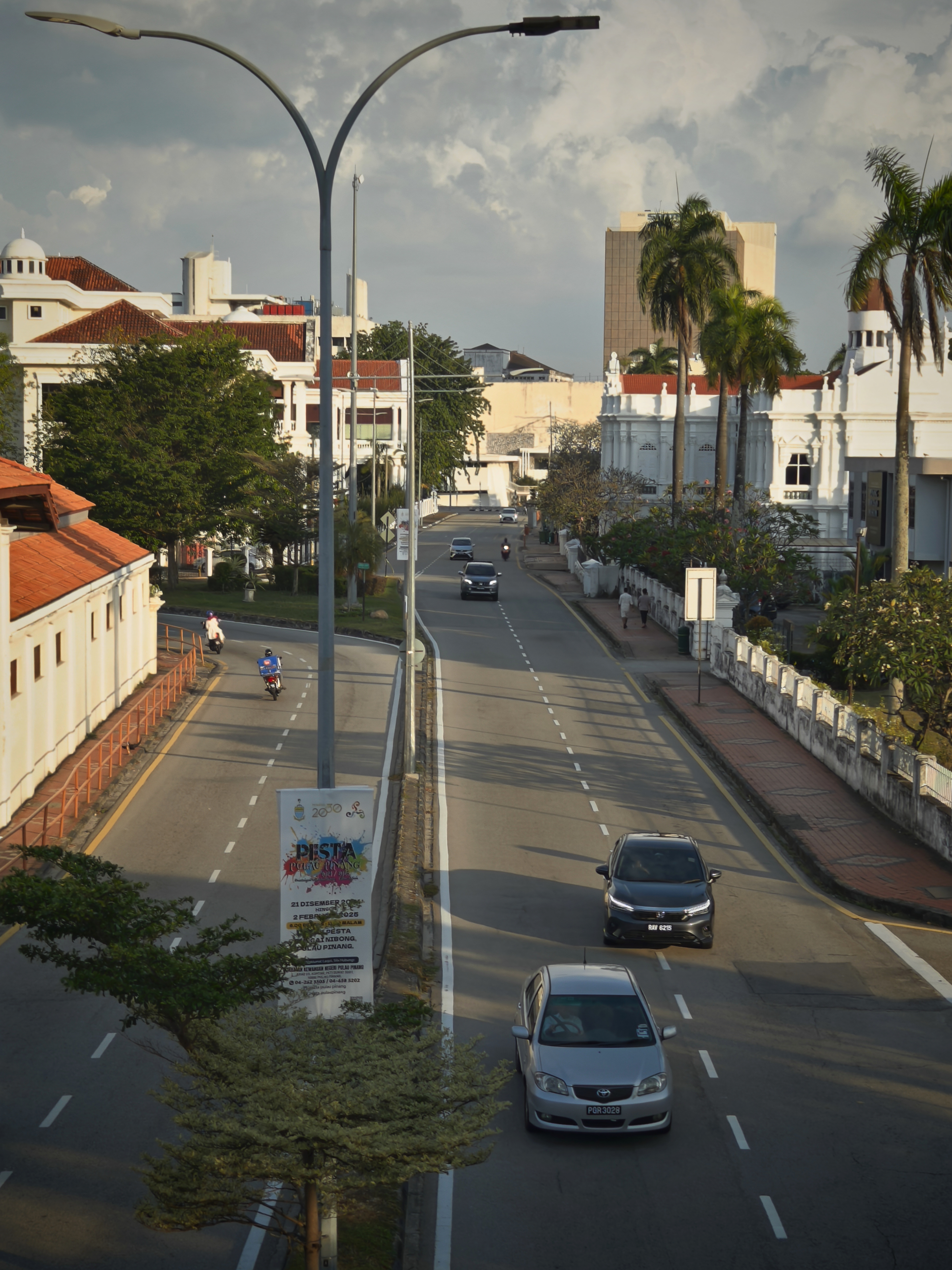
- Native name: Malay: Lebuh Farquhar; Simplified Chinese: 华盖街; traditional Chinese: 華蓋街; Tamil: ஃபர்குஹார் தெரு
- Maintained by: Penang Island City Council
- Location: George Town
- Coordinates: 5.420772°N 100.338433°E
- West end: Northam Road
- East end: Pitt Street

Construction
- Inauguration: 1804
- LEBUH FARQUHAR Farquhar St10200 P. PINANG

UNESCO World Heritage Site
- Type: Cultural
- Criteria: ii, iii, iv
- Designated: 2008 (32nd session)
- Part of: George Town UNESCO Core and Buffer Zones
- Reference no.: 1223
- Region: Asia-Pacific

Farquhar Street is a major thoroughfare in the city of George Town within the Malaysian state of Penang. Created in the late 18th century, the road forms part of the city centre's civic precinct, and is notable for the colonial buildings built under British rule. These include some of the most significant civic, religious, and commercial buildings of Penang, such as Penang High Court, Penang State Museum and Art Gallery, St. George's Church, Church of the Assumption, and Eastern & Oriental Hotel.

Located within the city's UNESCO World Heritage Site, the road was also the cradle of the top English schools in Penang - Penang Free School, St. Xavier's Institution, Convent Light Street and St. George's Girls' School. Today, only St. Xavier's Institution and Convent Light Street remain at Farquhar Street, while the other schools have since been relocated.

== Etymology ==
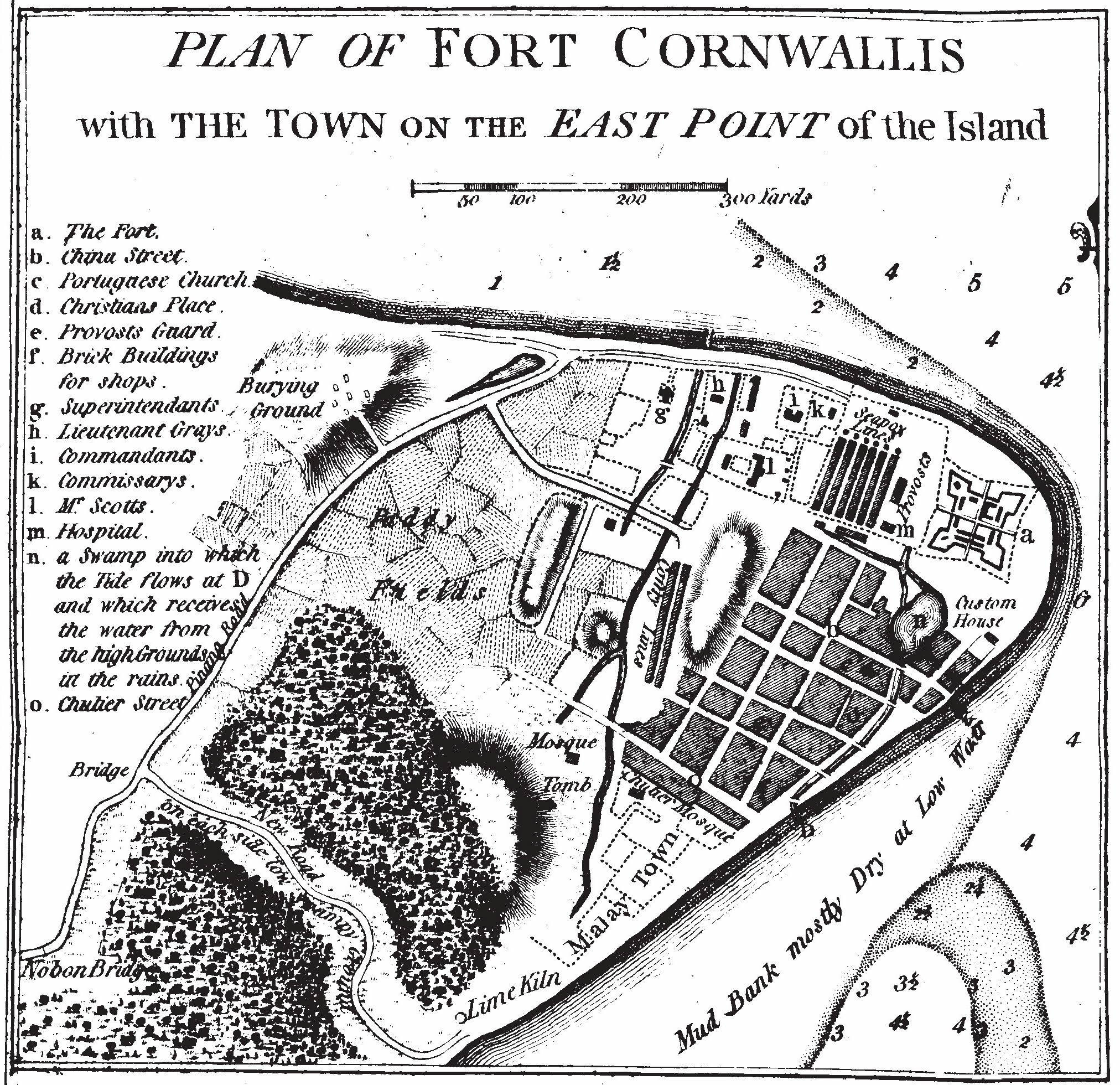
Farquhar Street can be seen in this 1799 map of George Town

Farquhar Street was named after Robert Townsend Farquhar, who served as the second Lieutenant-Governor of the Prince of Wales Island (now Penang Island).

During his tenure between 1804 and 1805, Farquhar advocated the destruction of Malacca in order to strengthen George Town's position as the premier harbour within the Malacca Straits. At the time, Malacca had been temporarily given to the British East India Company by the Dutch, whose country was conquered by France, to prevent the colony from coming under French control. Anxious to demolish Malacca prior to the return of the Dutch, Farquhar ordered William Farquhar, the Resident of Malacca, to destroy the city using gunpowder. Only the timely intervention by Stamford Raffles (who would go on to found Singapore) prevented the total destruction of A Famosa, leaving behind a small gate which stands to this day.

On the other hand, Farquhar was responsible for the improvements in infrastructure in George Town, such as the construction of an aqueduct and a Government House, and the enlargement of Fort Cornwallis.

== History ==
Farquhar Street was laid out towards the end of the 18th century and appeared in the earliest maps of George Town. However, it was only named Farquhar Street either during or after the term of Robert Townsend Farquhar as the Lieutenant-Governor between 1804 and 1805.

As British officials and Europeans moved into Farquhar Street, a number of magnificent colonial buildings were erected along the road. The Anglicans completed the St. George's Church at the junction with Pitt Street in 1818, while the Catholics built the Church of the Assumption in 1857. The famous Eastern & Oriental Hotel near the western end of Farquhar Street was constructed by the Sarkies Brothers in the 1880s.

The road also became the birthplace of some of the best English and missionary schools in Penang. The oldest of all, Penang Free School (now located at Green Lane), was established in 1819 in what is now the Penang State Museum. Between 1856 and 1858, two Catholic schools, St. Xavier's Institution and Convent Light Street, were relocated to Farquhar Street; both remain at the street to this day. Meanwhile, St. George's Girls' School was founded by the Anglicans in the latter half of the 18th century; the school has since been moved to Macalister Road.

== Gallery ==
From west to east:

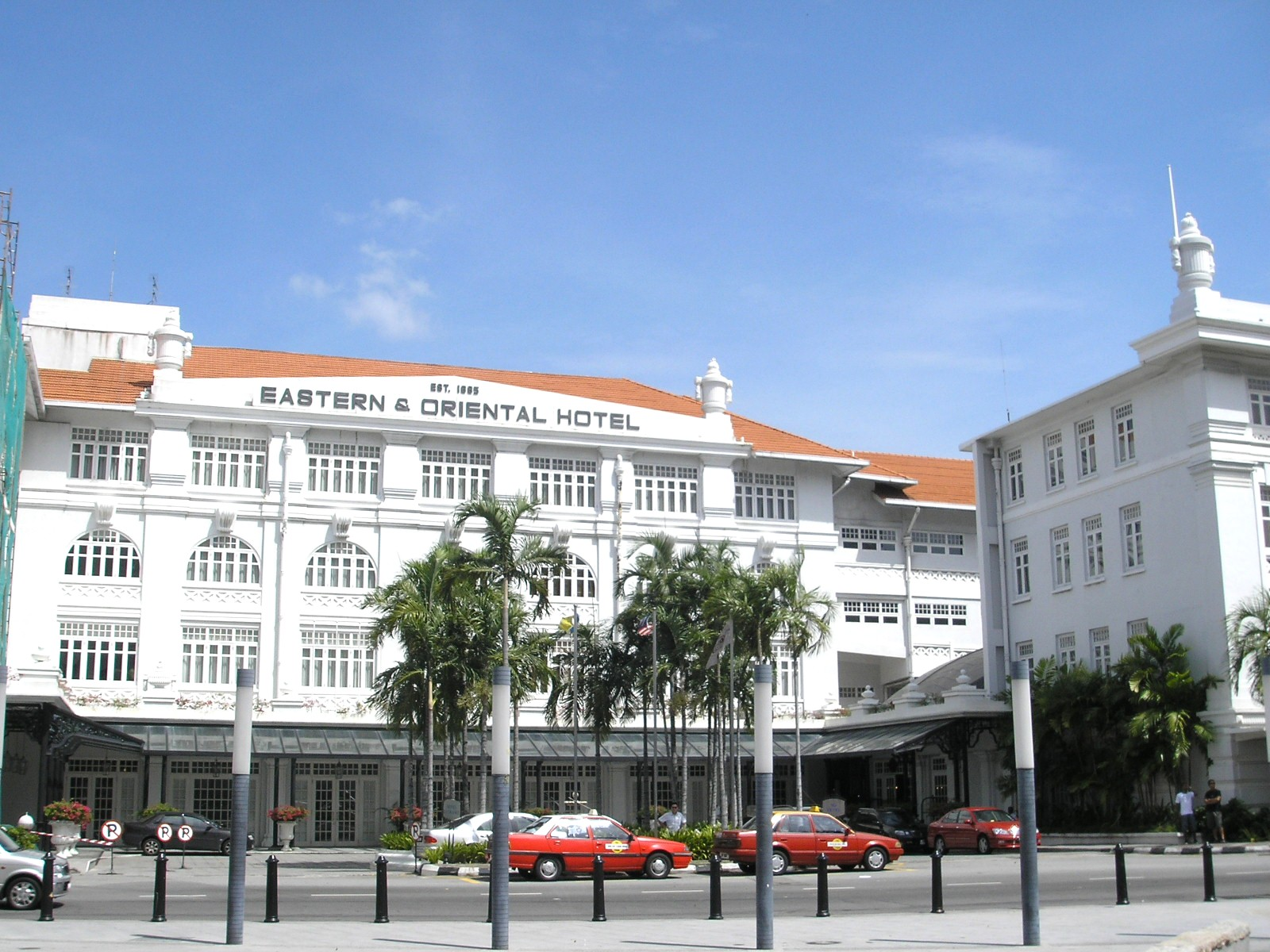
The Eastern & Oriental Hotel was built by the Sarkies Brothers, who went on to establish similar luxurious hotels in Singapore and Yangon.

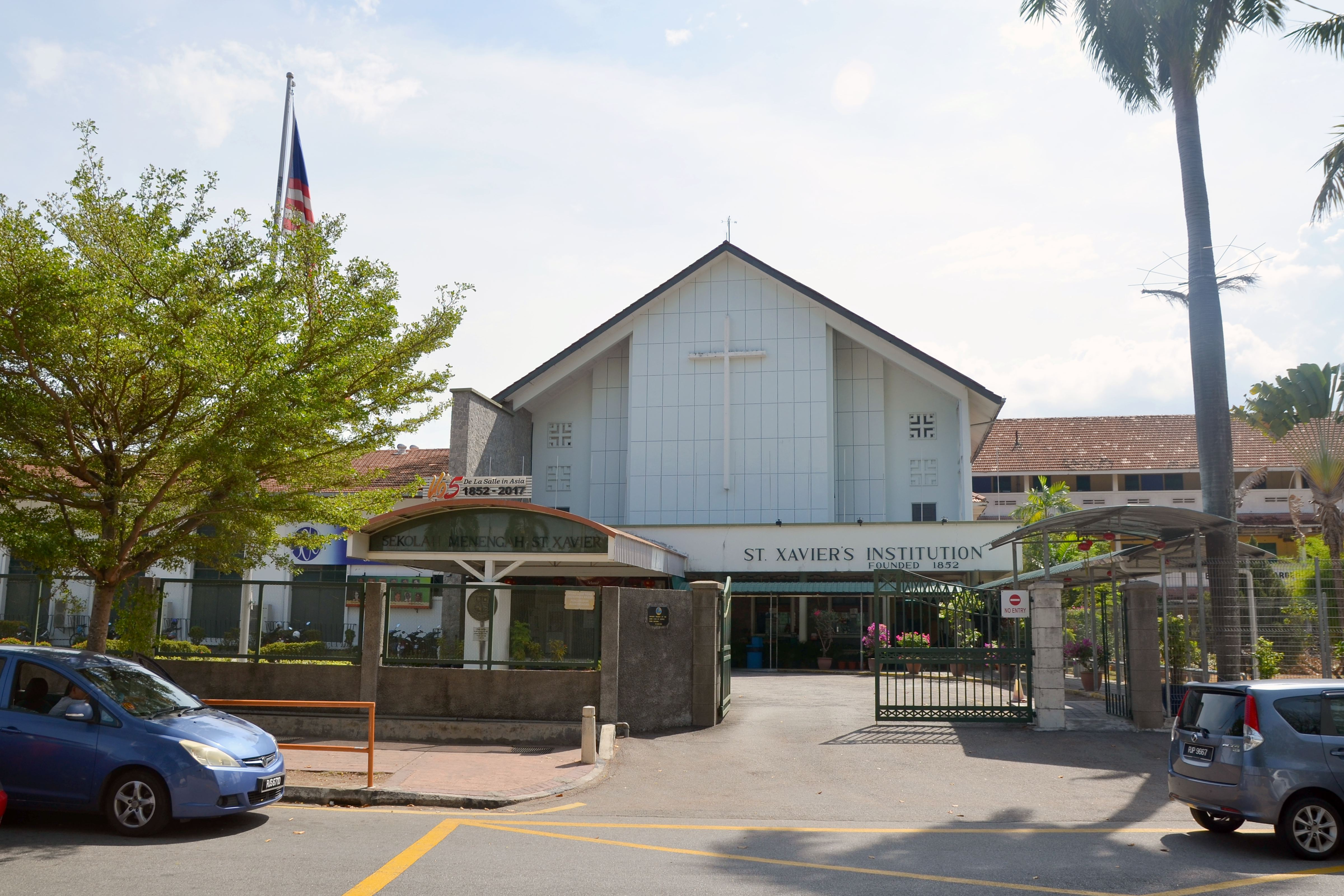
St. Xavier's Institution, one of Penang's premier schools, viewed from Farquhar Street.

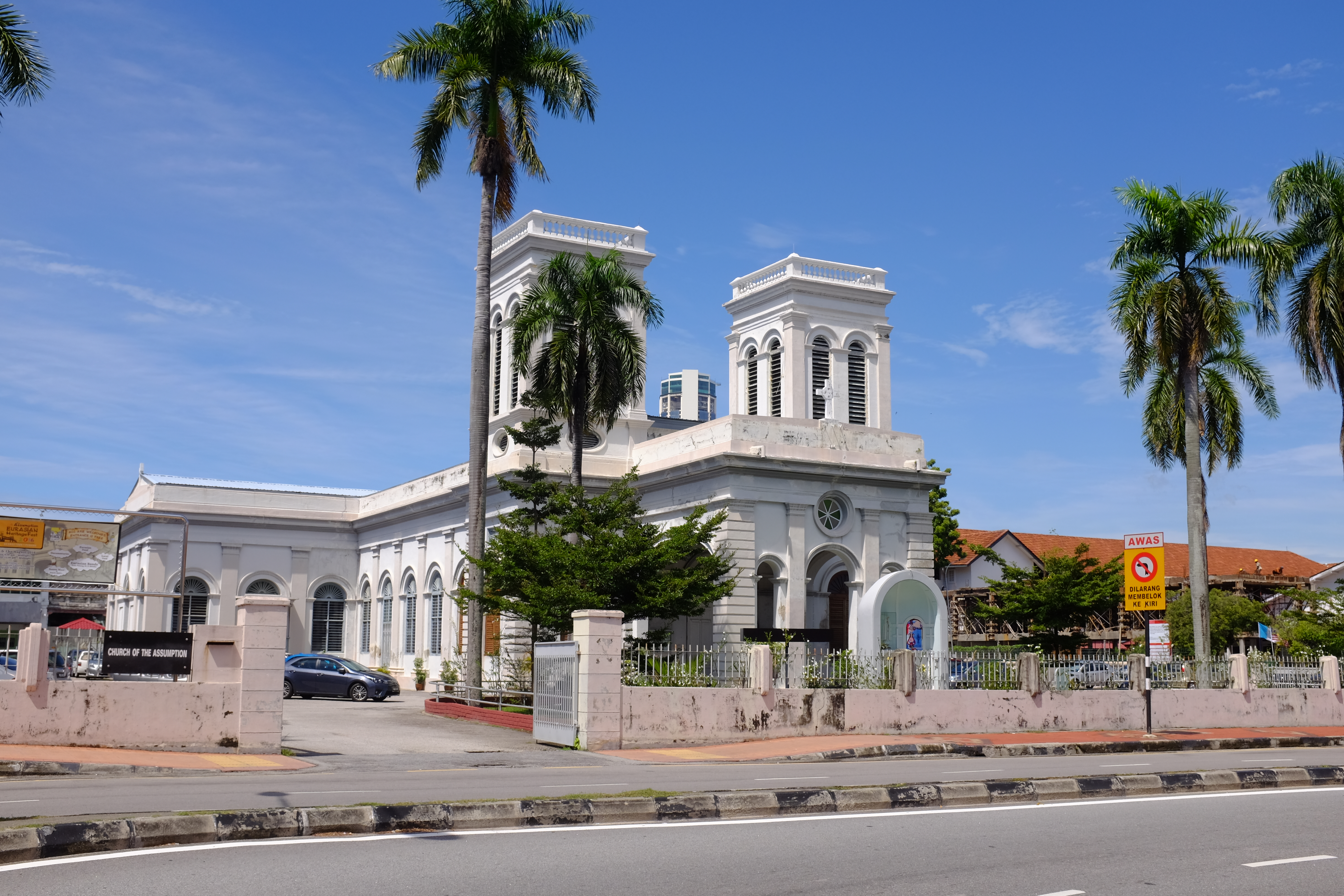
The Church of the Assumption has a history dating back to the migration of Eurasians to Penang in 1786.

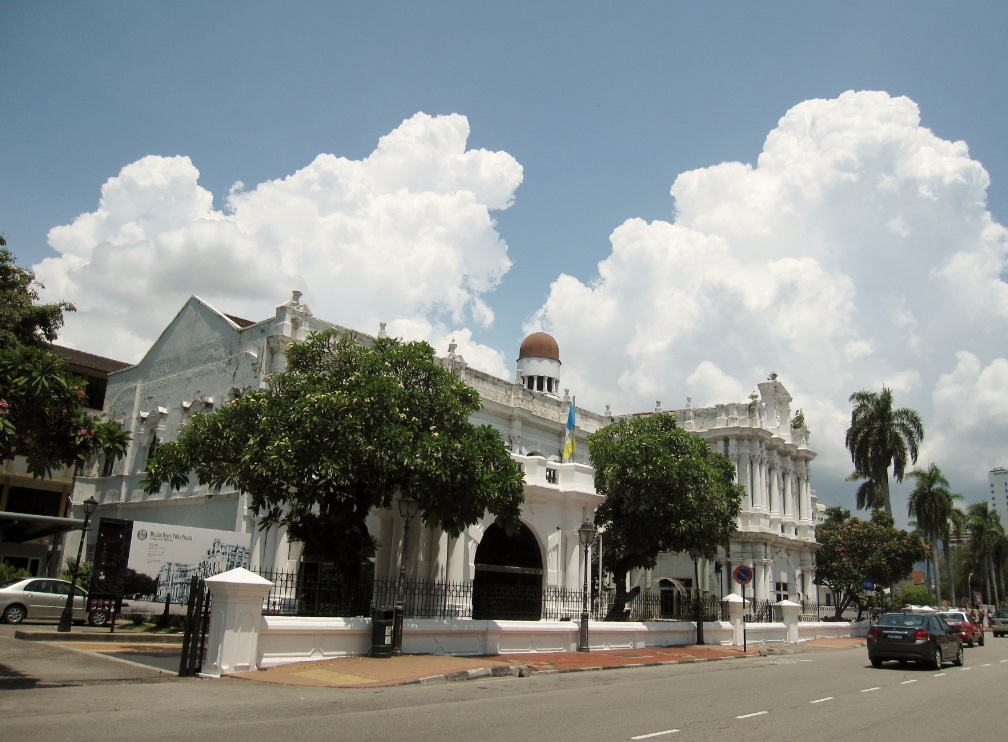
The colonial-era Penang State Museum once housed Penang Free School until 1927, when the school was relocated further inland.

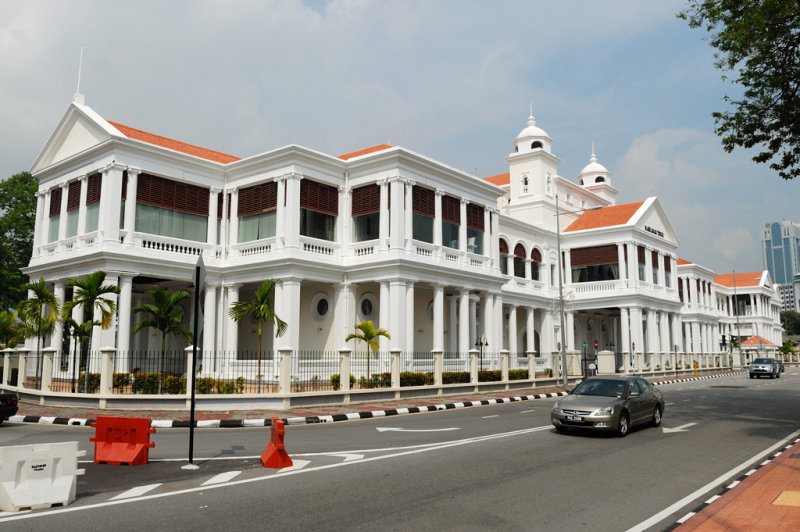
The High Court of Penang is also bounded by Farquhar Street.

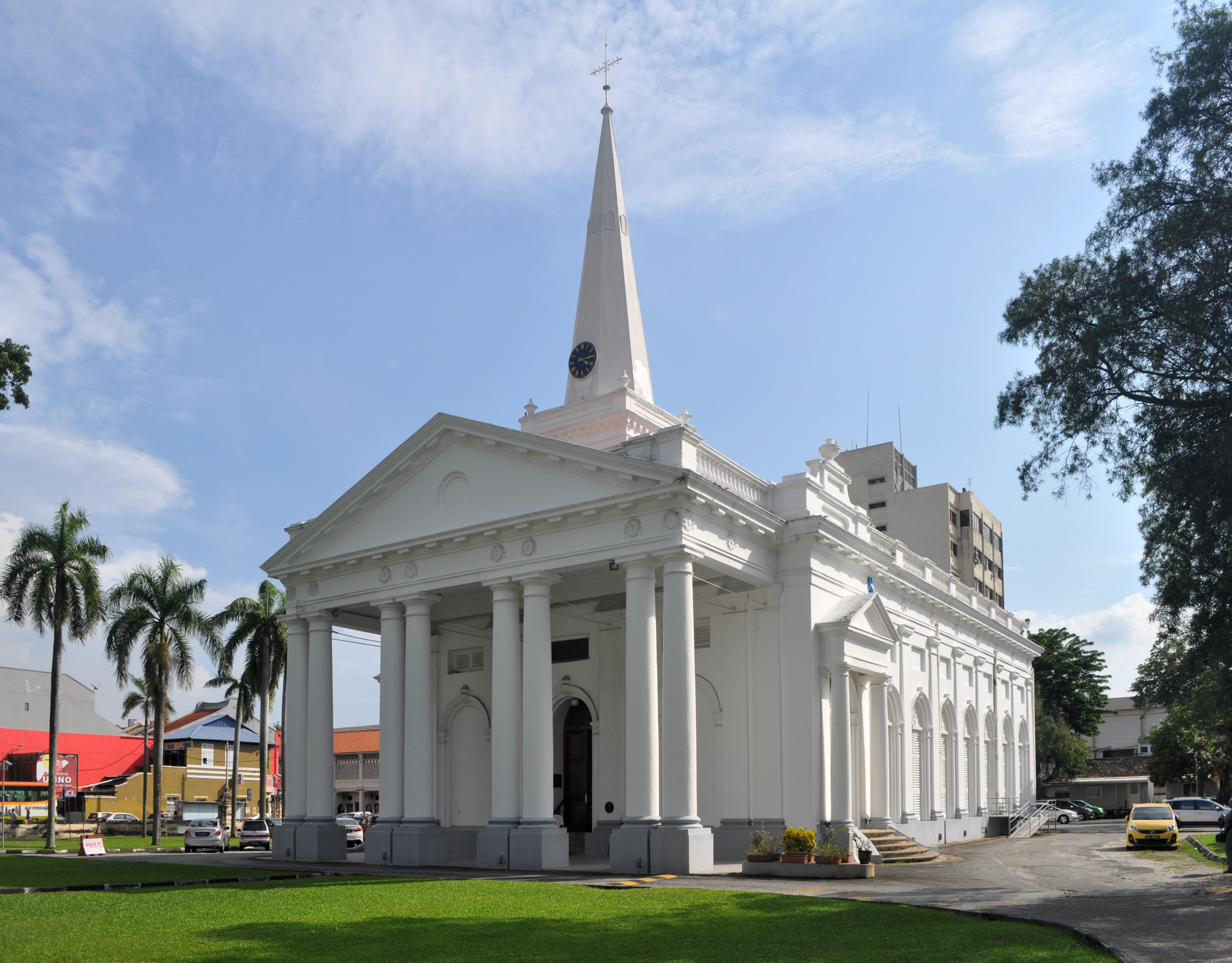
St. George's Church, the oldest Anglican church in Southeast Asia.

== Landmarks ==
- St. George's Church
- Church of the Assumption
- Penang State Museum and Art Gallery
- MWE Plaza

== Judiciary ==
- High Court of Penang

== Education ==
- Convent Light Street
- St. Xavier's Institution

== Hotels ==
- Eastern & Oriental Hotel

== See also ==
- List of roads in George Town
- Architecture of Penang
