= Gleneagle =

Gleneagle can mean:

== Australia ==
- Gleneagle, Queensland, a rural locality in the Scenic Rim Region
- Gleneagle, Western Australia

== Canada ==
- Gleneagle Secondary School, a public high school in Coquitlam, British Columbia, Canada

== United States ==
- Gleneagle, Colorado
- A neighborhood in Arlington, Washington

== See also ==
- Gleneagles (disambiguation)
