= Gleneagles Hospital Penang =

- IHH Healthcare Malaysia
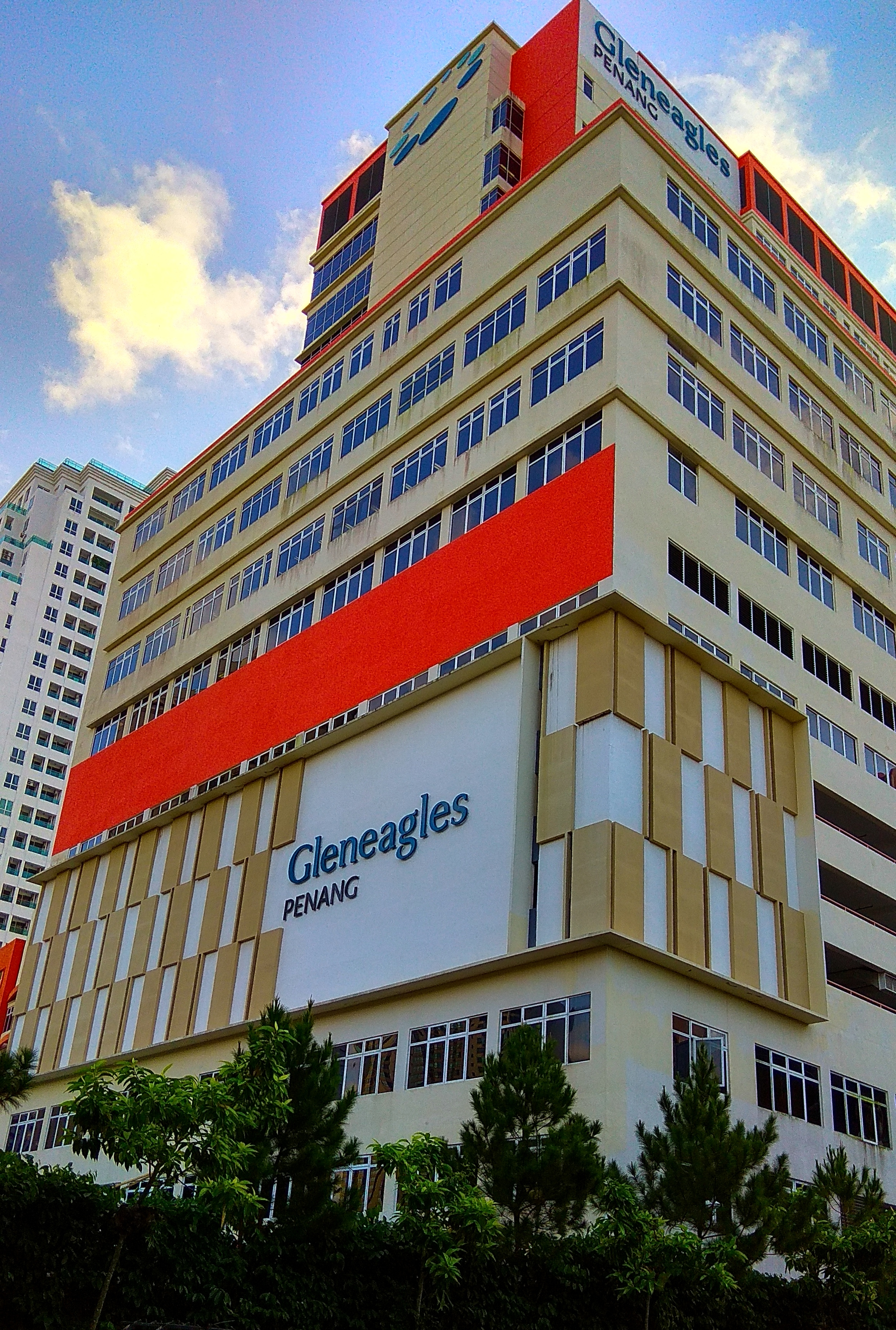
- Gleneagles Hospital Penang

Geography
- Location: 1, Jalan Pangkor, 10050 George Town, Penang, Malaysia
- Coordinates: 5.426865°N 100.319774°E

Organisation
- Type: General
- Network: Parkway Pantai, IHH Healthcare

Services
- Standards: Joint Commission International; Malaysian Society for Quality in Health
- Emergency department: Yes
- Beds: 380

History
- Founded: 1973

Links
- Website: www.gleneagles.com.my/penang

Gleneagles Hospital Penang (GPG) is a private hospital in George Town within the Malaysian state of Penang. Established in 1973, the 380-bed tertiary care provider houses over 85 doctors which cover a wide array of medical specialties, supported by more than 1,100 employees (nurses, allied health personnel and support staff). The hospital now consists of its original six-storey building and a 19-storey annex.

== History ==
The Gleneagles Hospital Penang was established in 1973 and was originally a three-storey hospital with 70 beds. It was located at the junction of Jalan Cantonment and Jalan Bell. The hospital was subsequently expanded to six floors in 1977, housing 132 beds. In 1989, Parkway Pantai, a Singapore-listed healthcare firm, acquired the majority control of the hospital, which was then renamed the Gleneagles Medical Centre. The hospital was expanded again in 2013, with the completion of a 19-storey annex. Today it is known as Gleneagles Hospital Penang and accommodates 380 beds. The acting CEO of Gleneagles Hospital Penang is Mr. Ng Bong Seng.

Gleneagles Hospital Penang is one of 16 hospitals operated by Pantai Holdings Sdn Bhd (Pantai Group), which is part of Parkway Pantai Limited, a subsidiary of IHH Healthcare Berhad (IHH).

== Facilities and services ==
Gleneagles Hospital Penang's medical services include the following specialties.

- 24-hour Emergency Department
- Cancer Centre
- Heart Centre
- Orthopaedic Centre
- ESWL / Stone Treatment Centre
- Gastrointestinal Diagnostics
- Minimally Invasive Surgery
- Imaging
- Neurophysiology Laboratory
- Radiotherapy Centre
- Scope Centre
- Weight Management Centre
- Cardiac Catheterization Laboratory
- Cardiac Diagnostic Unit
- Intensive Care Unit (ICU)
- Labour & Delivery Suite
- Operating Theatre with Laminar Flow
- Pharmacy
- Rehabilitation Centre
- Online services, eHealthChat and eHealthConsult

== See also ==
- Gleneagles Hospital Kuala Lumpur
