= Aware Global Hospital =

- Global Hospitals

Geography
- Location: L. B. Nagar, Hyderabad, Telangana, India
- Coordinates: 17.345989°N 78.540103°E

Organisation
- Type: Specialist

Links
- Website: www.gleneaglesglobalhospitals.com
- Lists: Hospitals in India

AWARE Global Hospital is a specialized hospital located in the Karmanghat area of Hyderabad in the Indian state of Telangana. This hospital was established by P.K.S. Madhavanji, founder and chairman of AWARE Group, and named was named as AWARE Hospital. The hospital was later leased to Global Hospitals Group and renamed AWARE Global Hospitals.

== Overview ==
After taking on lease of AWARE Hospitals in 2008 by the Global Hospitals, Banjara Hills, Hyderabad, the hospital opened its branch hospitals in Bangalore, BGS Global Hospital and in Chennai (Global Health City). Their Hyderabad chain was named as Aware Global Hospital. The 300-bed hospital built at L.B. Nagar in Hyderabad, apart from specialized ICU services in medical, surgical, cardiac, cardiothoracic surgery and various other surgical fields, offers facilities to handle cases of trauma, emergency, gastroenterology, cardiology, neurology, nephrology, oncology, etc.
