= Eva Kwok =

Canadian businessman

Eva Lee Kwok (born c. 1942) is a Malaysian-born Canadian business executive and investor. She is currently based in Vancouver, British Columbia, Canada. She spent her early life in Penang, where she attended St. George's Girls' School.

She has served as chairperson and CEO of Amara International Investment Corporation since 1992. She previously served in a variety of roles, including president and managing director of Melcorp Mercantile Inc., vice-president of the Asia Pacific Foundation of Canada and president and CEO of the Saskatchewan Institute of Applied Science and Technology. From 1968 to 1988, Kwok taught at the University of Saskatchewan in progressively senior positions, becoming Dean of the College of Home Economics in 1986.

Her own investment firm, Amara International Investment Corp., was responsible for the development of Burnaby's Crystal Mall.

Kwok received her Master of Science (Nutrition) from King's College London, University of London, England in 1967.

She also serves as a director of B.C. Women's Hospital and Health Centre Foundation and Canada's Outstanding Chief Executive Officer of the Year Award Program.

== Personal ==
Kwok is married to architect and urban planner, Stanley Kwok. He is a former Deputy Chairman of Concord Pacific Developments and currently president of private investment firm Amara International.

== Board member ==
Kwok serves on the board of directors of these companies:

- CK Life Sciences International (Holdings) Inc. It is engaged in the business of research and development, commercialisation, marketing and sale of biotechnology products.
- Husky Energy Inc. is a publicly traded, large, integrated energy company with interests globally [4] and its head office in Calgary, Alberta
- Cheung Kong Infrastructure Holdings Ltd is the flagship of the Cheung Kong Group, headquartered in Hong Kong, and one of Hong Kong's leading multi-national conglomerates.
- The Advisory Board for the National Awards in Governance of the Conference Board of Canada/Spencer Stuart and the Advisory Council
- University of British Columbia, Faculty of Graduate Studies.

Previous board affiliations include:

- Air Canada is the flag carrier and largest airline of Canada.
- B.C. Women's Hospital & Health Centre
- Bank of Montreal from 14 September 1999 until 3 March 2009
- Coca-Cola Beverages Ltd.
- Fletcher Challenge Canada
- Health Centre Foundation
- Scott Paper Ltd. is a USA-based corporation which manufactures primarily paper based consumer products.
- Shoppers Drug Mart is Canada's largest retail pharmacy chain, and it has its headquarters in North York, Toronto, Ontario.
- B.C. Progress Board
- Telesystems International Wireless Inc.) was a Canadian-based fast-growing, global mobile communications operator.
- Vancouver General Hospital Foundation
