= Loh Guan Lye Specialists Centre =

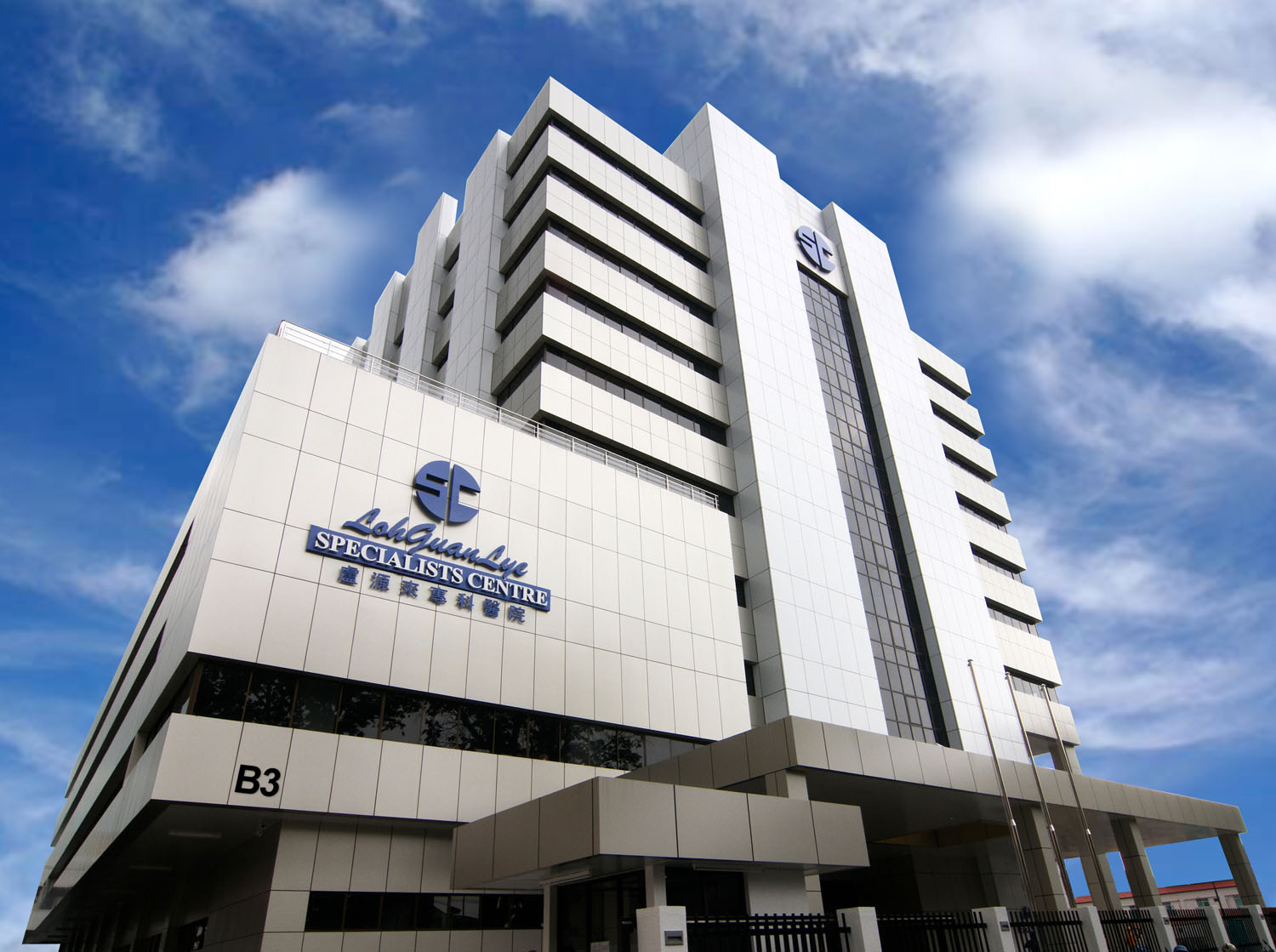

Geography
- Location: 238, Macalister Road, 10400 George Town, Penang, Malaysia
- Coordinates: 5.41955°N 100.317943°E

Services
- Standards: Malaysian Society for Quality in Health
- Emergency department: Yes
- Beds: 276

History
- Founded: 1975

Links
- Website: lohguanlye.com

Loh Guan Lye Specialists Centre is a private hospital in George Town within the Malaysian state of Penang. Established in 1975, the 273-bed hospital has been expanded over the years and now consists of three wings - the Main Wing, a Diagnostic Wing, and a Women and Children Wing.

== History ==
The hospital, founded in 1975, was named after its founder, Dr Loh Guan Lye. It has since been expanded, with the completion of a 10-storey wing in 2009.

== Services ==
Among the services provided by the hospital are as follows.

- Gastroenterology, hepatology and therapeutic endoscopy
- Endocrine surgery
- Breast surgery
- Radiotherapy
- Chemotherapy
- Cardiology and cardiothoracic surgery
- Orthopedic surgery
- Otorhinolaryngology
- Obstetrics
- Gynaecology
- Colorectal surgery
- Neurosurgery
- Neurology
- Urology
- Cochlear implant
- CT scanning
- In vitro fertilisation

== See also ==
- List of hospitals in Malaysia
