= Gleneagles Global Hospitals =

Private Hospital in India

Gleneagles Hospitals (formerly Global Hospitals Group) is a hospital network based in India.

Gleneagles Global Hospitals logo

== History ==
Global Hospitals Group was founded by Dr. K. Ravindranath in 1999 with a focus on multi-organ transplantation. The hospital has performed India's first successful split and auxiliary liver transplant, and the first combined heart and kidney transplant.

In August 2015, IHH Healthcare announced the acquisition of 73.4% stake in Hyderabad-based GE Medical Associates Pvt Ltd, which had hospitals under the brand Global Hospitals, for ₹1,280 crore. IHH Healthcare Berhad consolidated its Indian platform by rebranding Global Hospitals under the brand Gleneagles.

In March 2017, Gleneagles Global Hospitals announced plans to invest ₹200 crore to grow its market presence. The planned expansion included increasing overall bed capacity from 1,400 beds to 2,100 beds within two years, and establishing a presence in Delhi.

The India operations are led by Dr. K. Ravindranath, Chairman, Gleneagles Global Hospitals and Ramesh Krishnan, Chief Executive Officer, India Operations Division, Parkway Pantai Limited. In April 2018, Parkway Pantai announced the appointment of Dr Ajay Bakshi as the Chief Executive Officer – Designate for its India Operations Division.

== Hospitals ==
- Aware Gleneagles Global Hospital, LB Nagar, Hyderabad
- Gleneagles Global Hospital, Lakdi-ka-pul, Hyderabad
- Gleneagles Global Health City, Perumbakkam, Chennai
- BGS Gleneagles Global Hospital, Kengeri, Bengaluru
- Gleneagles Global Hospital, Richmond Road, Bengaluru
- Global Hospital, Parel, Mumbai

Clinic

- Gleneagles Global Clinic, Adyar, Chennai

== See also ==
- Healthcare in India
- List of hospitals in India
- Gleneagles Hospital (disambiguation)
