= Island Hospital =

Private Hospital in Penang, Malaysia

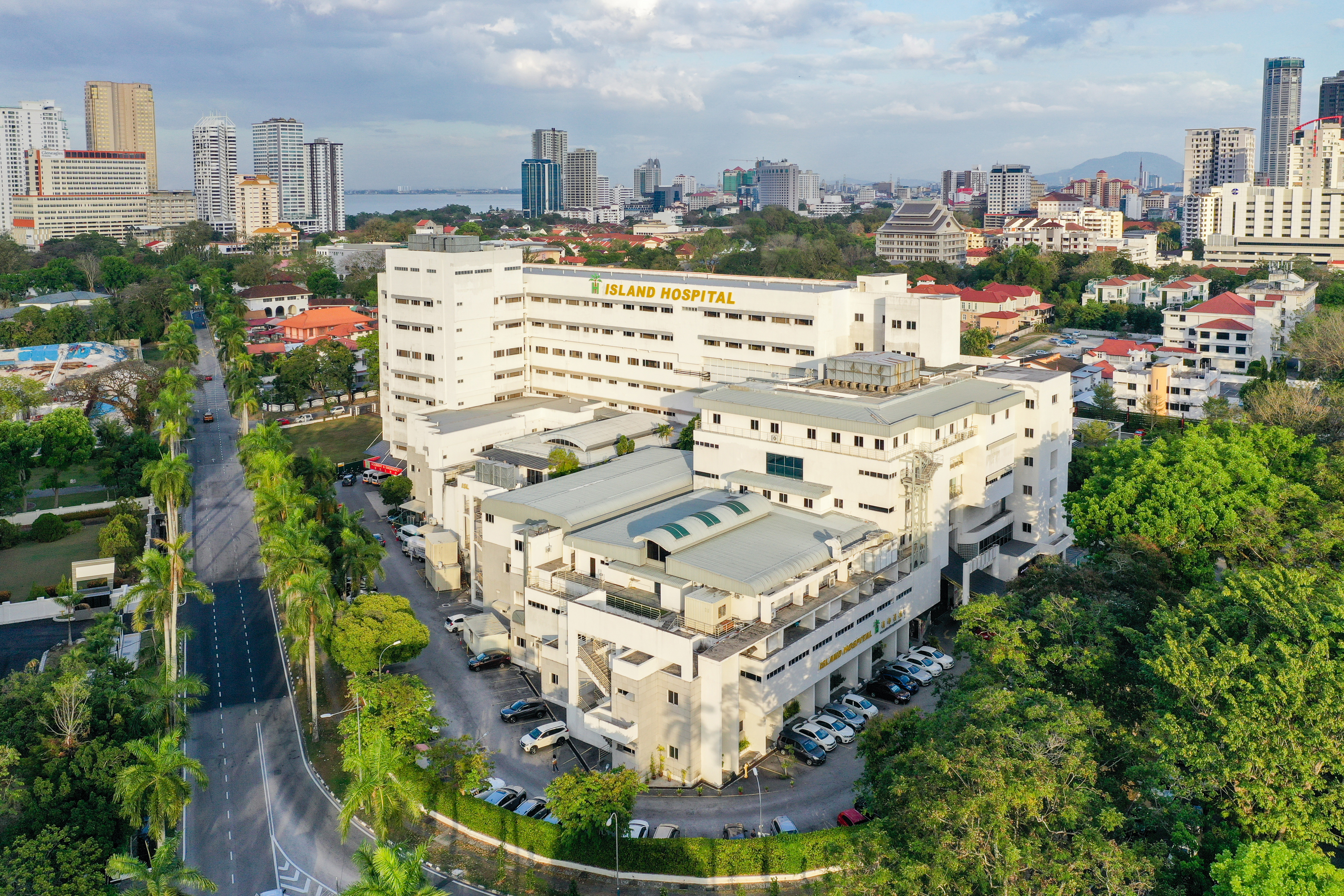

Geography
- Location: 308, Macalister Road, 10450 George Town, Penang, Malaysia
- Coordinates: 5.42236°N 100.313983°E

Services
- Standards: Malaysian Society for Quality in Health
- Emergency department: Yes
- Beds: 600

History
- Founded: 1996

Links
- Website: https://islandhospital.com/

Island Hospital is a private hospital in George Town within the Malaysian state of Penang. Founded in 1996, the 600-bed tertiary care provider has over 80 full-time specialists across 9 centres.

== History ==
Island Hospital was founded in 1996, with the construction of the hospital eventually taking a mere 10 months.

In 2017, the Penang state government announced plans to build an extension to the existing facility, named Island Medical City, at Peel Avenue. Upon completion, the project is expected to expand the hospital's capacity to 1000 beds. Planned facilities also include a healthcare traveler hotel and medical suites. In 2024, the hospital was purchased by Malaysian conglomerate IHH Healthcare.

== Services ==
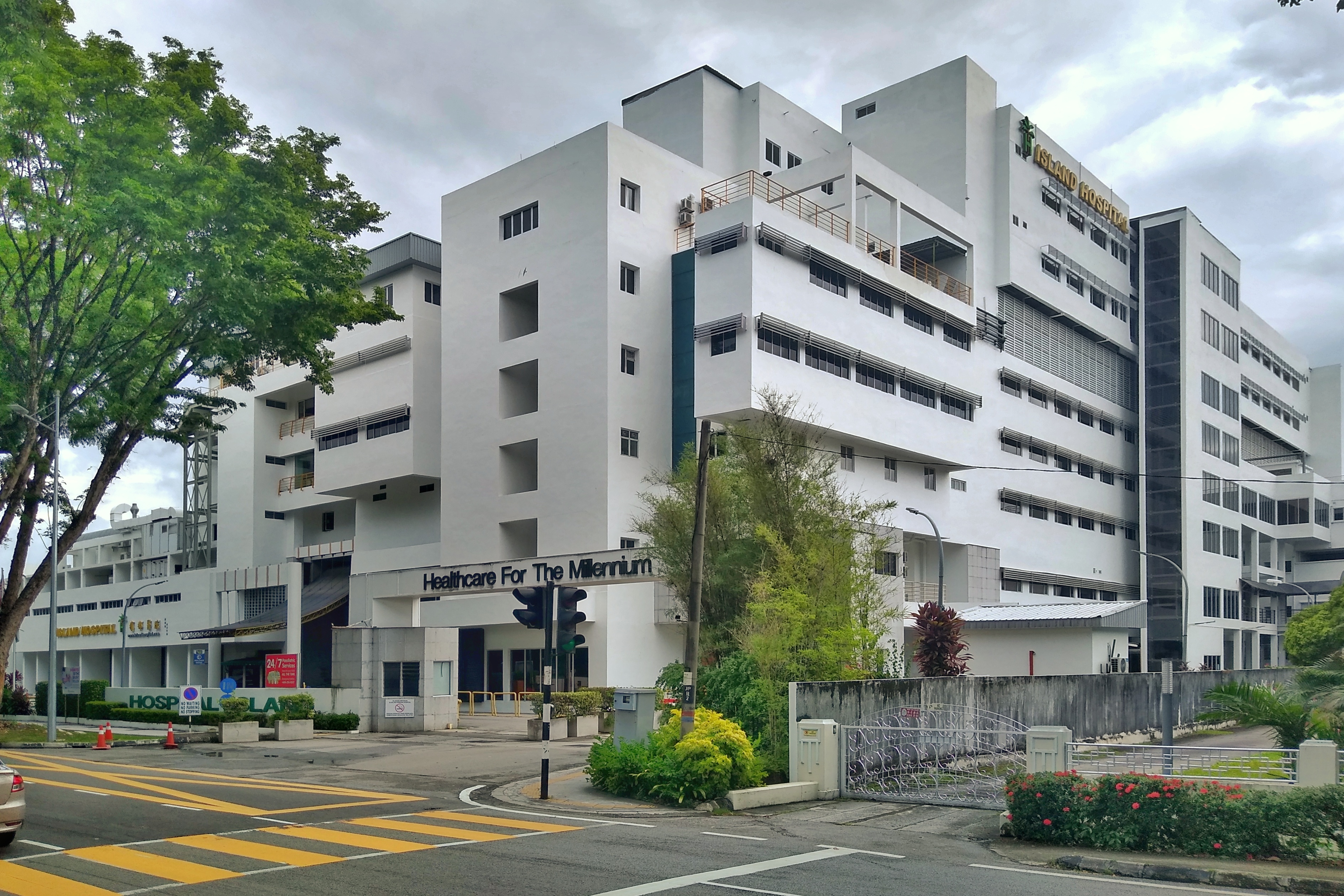
Island Hospital viewed from Macalister Road, George Town

The following medical treatments are provided by the hospital.

- Cardiology Heart Centre
- Anesthesiology and Critical Care
- Clinical Psychology
- Clinical Radiology
- Dermatology
- Ear, Nose and Throat
- Endocrinology
- General and Paediatric Surgery
- Gastroenterology
- Hematology
- Hepatology
- Infectious Diseases & Travel Medicine
- Internal Medicine
- Neurology
- Nephrology and Haemodialysis
- Obstetrics and Gynaecology
- Oncology
- Ophthalmology
- Orthopaedics
- Neurosurgery
- Orthopaedics & Trauma Surgery
- Paediatrics
- Pathology
- Psychiatry
- Plastic Surgery
- Psychiatry
- Respiratory Medicine
- Speech & Language Pathology & Therapy
- Urology

== Centres of Excellence ==
Island Hospital has 9 centres that offer a range of services.

- Endoscopy Centre
- Fertility Centre
- Health Screening Centre
- Heart Centre
- Movement Disorder Clinic
- Physiotherapy & Rehabilitation Centre
- Spine Centre
- Urology Centre

== Accreditation ==
Island Hospital holds accreditation from:

- Malaysian Society for Quality in Health (MSQH)
- Australian Council on Healthcare Standards International (ACHSI)

== See also ==
- IHH Healthcare
- List of hospitals in Malaysia
