= MWE Plaza =

Office building in George Town, Penang, Malaysia

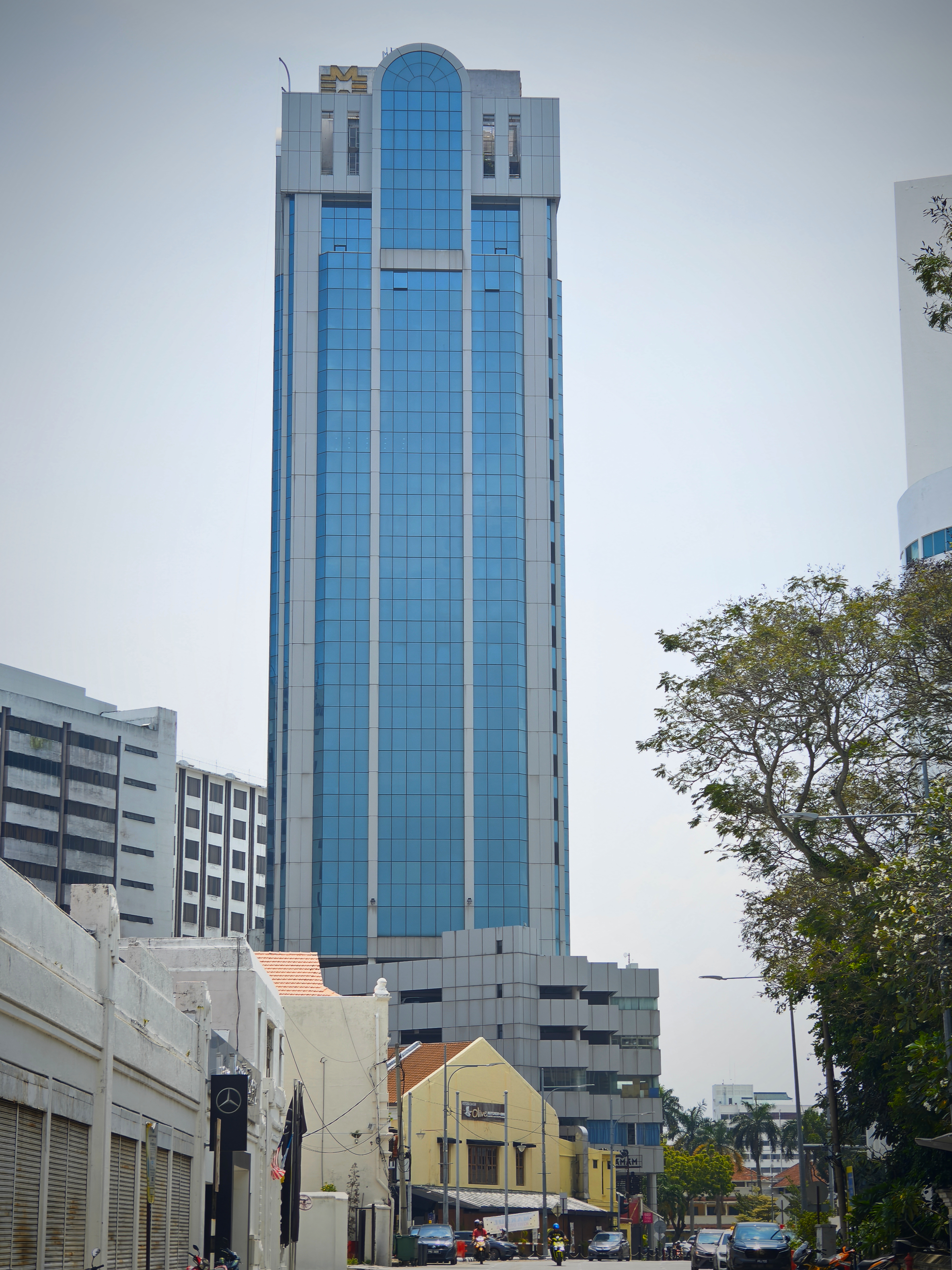

General information
- Location: 8, Farquhar Street, 10200 George Town, Penang, Malaysia, George Town, Penang, Malaysia
- Coordinates: 5.4221°N 100.3353°E
- Opened: 1996
- Owner: MWE Holdings

Height
- Top floor: 25

Technical details
- Floor count: 25

MWE Plaza is an office building within George Town in the Malaysian state of Penang. Located at the junction of Farquhar and Leith streets within the city's Central Business District (CBD), the 25-storey building was opened in 1996. It is owned by MWE Holdings, which was founded by Low Hock Peng, the father of international fugitive Jho Low.

== History ==
MWE Holdings was founded by Low Hock Peng and initially operated in the textile manufacturing industry before diversifying into real estate. In 1994, the company raised RM30 million through bonds for the construction of the 25-storey MWE Plaza, which was completed by 1996.

In 2021, MWE Plaza became embroiled in the 1Malaysia Development Berhad scandal when the Kuala Lumpur High Court ordered the seizure of Low's assets, some of which were kept at the Maybank branch within the building. In the years leading to the court order, Low's son Jho Low had gained international notoriety for his central role in the scandal. Jho Low cited government prosecution against his family as the reason for his refusal to return to Malaysia to face charges of money laundering and criminal breach of trust.

== See also ==
- List of tallest buildings in George Town
