= JKP Tower =

Office building in George Town, Penang, Malaysia

- Menara JKP (Malay)
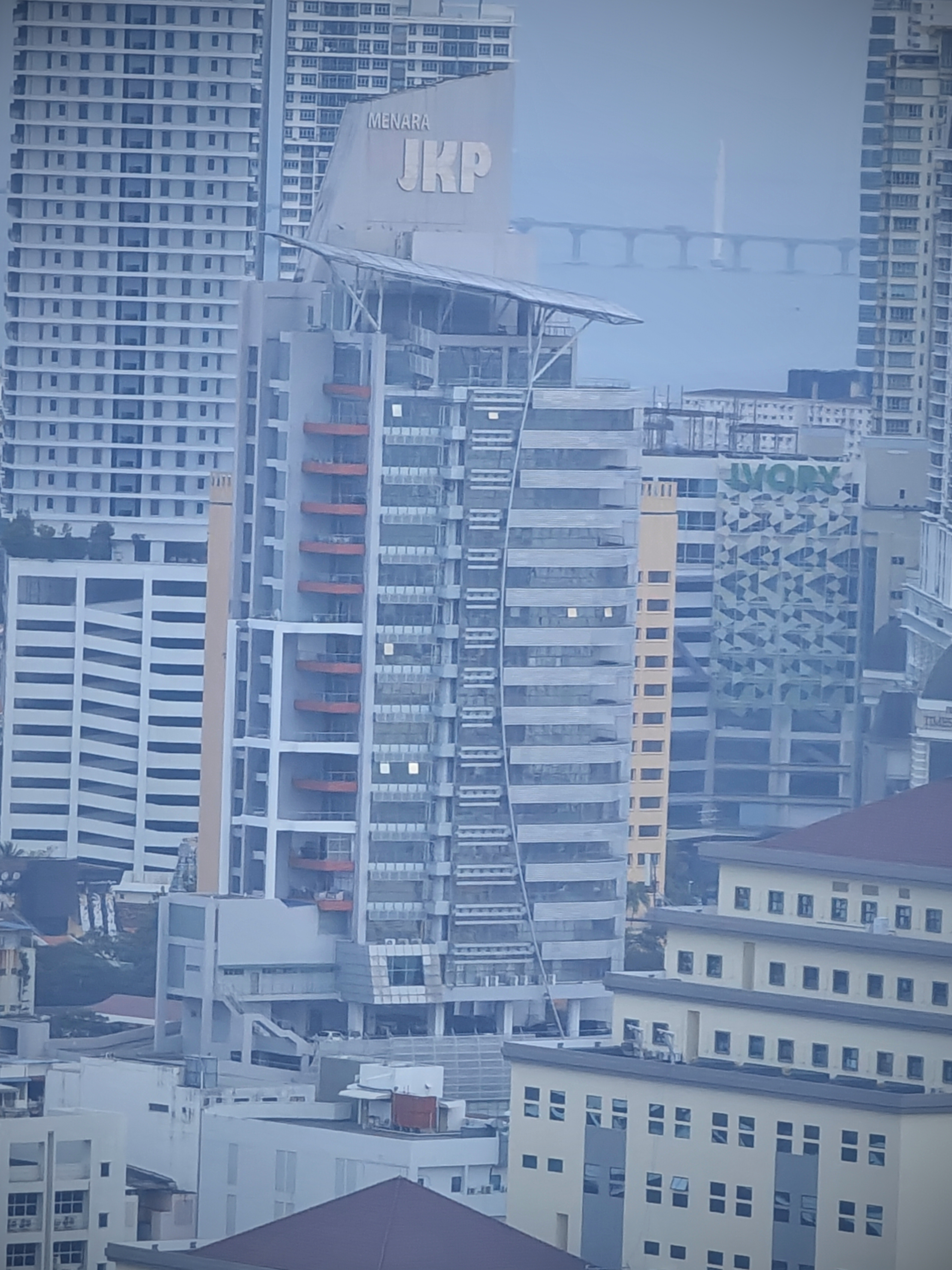
- Interactive map of the JKP Tower area
- Former names: UMNO Tower

General information
- Location: 128 Macalister Road, 10400 George Town, Penang, Malaysia, George Town, Penang, Malaysia
- Coordinates: 5.4161°N 100.3252°E
- Construction started: 1995
- Completed: 1997
- Opened: 1998
- Owner: Penang Bumiputra Development Council

Height
- Height: 93.5 m (307 ft)
- Top floor: 21

Technical details
- Floor count: 21
- Floor area: 16,700 m^{2} (180,000 sq ft)
- Grounds: 1,920 m^{2} (20,700 sq ft)

Design and construction
- Architect: Ken Yeang

JKP Tower, formerly known as UMNO Tower, is an office building within George Town in the Malaysian state of Penang. Built in 1998, the tower is located at the junction of Macalister Road and Jalan Zainal Abidin (formerly named Yahudi Road), within the city's Central Business District (CBD). It is owned by the Penang Bumiputera Development Council and functions as the state headquarters of the United Malays National Organisation (UMNO). The building is recognised as the first skyscraper in Malaysia to utilise a wing wall system and other bioclimatic features to facilitate natural ventilation.

== History ==
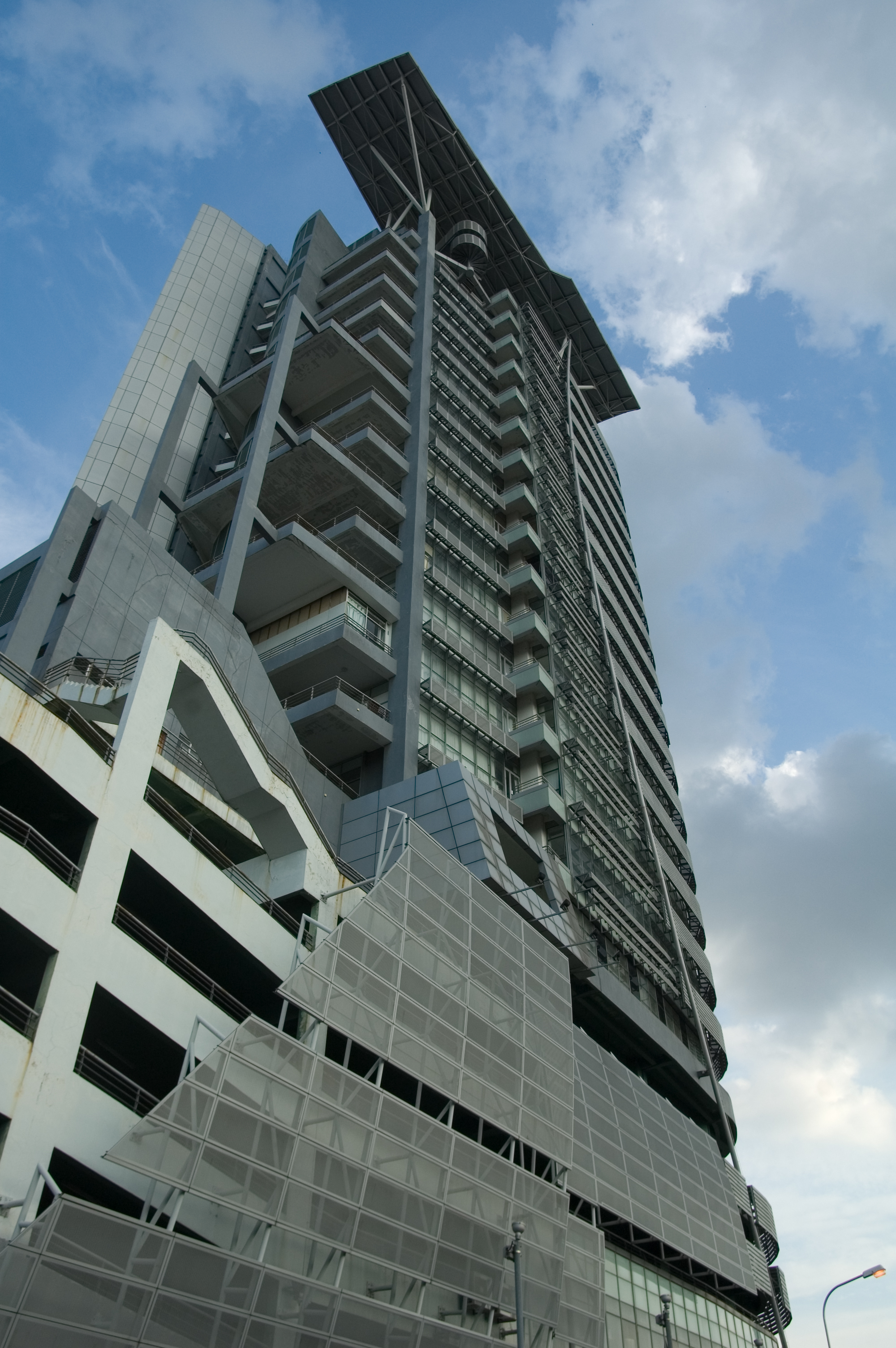
UMNO Tower c. 2008

The UMNO Tower was designed by local architect Ken Yeang, who was approached by a government-linked developer to create designs for a building on a 1,920 m^{2} (20,700 sq ft) plot of waqf land at the junction of Macalister Road and Jalan Zainal Abidin. According to Ken, due to financial constraints within the local Muslim community, the landowners stipulated that they would retain some degree of ownership of the property in exchange for proceeding with the project.

The waqf land originally accommodated a three-storey building owned by the United Malays National Organisation (UMNO). In exchange for the demolition of the old building, it was suggested that the new building could function as the Penang headquarters of UMNO, which formed part of the state government at the time. Construction began in 1995 and the RM35 million building was complete by the end of 1997. Opened in 1998, the building has since served as the state headquarters of UMNO.

In 2005, the tower was sold to JKP, a government-linked company that is part of the Penang Bumiputera Development Council. Concerns about its revenue generation had already emerged, as the waqf land had a market value of RM11.4 million, but rental returns were inadequate.

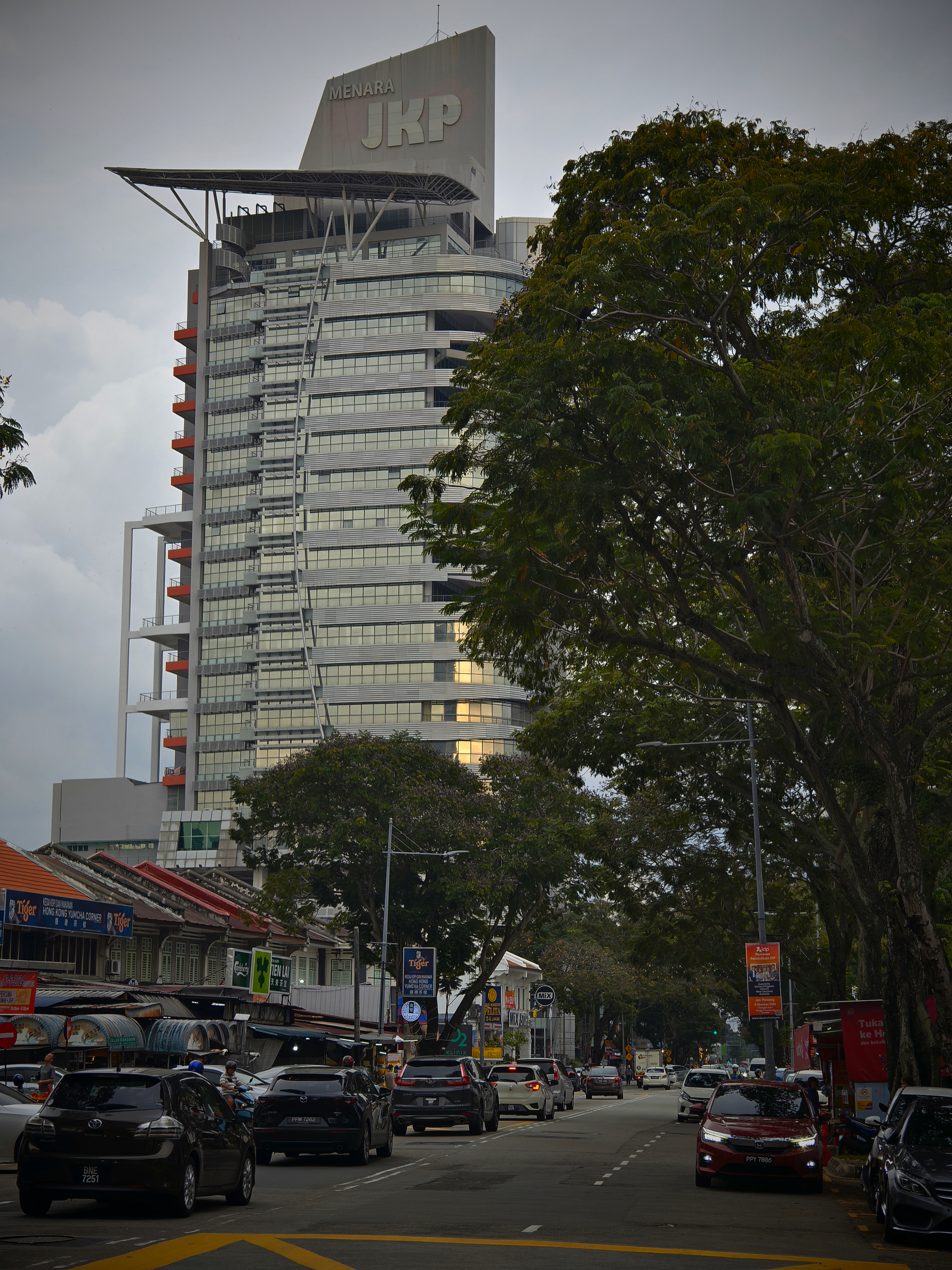
The stretch of Macalister Road where the tower's lightning arrester fell in 2013. The remains of one of the victims, Lim Chin Aik, are still buried under this stretch.

In 2013, the tower's 15 m (49 ft) long lightning arrester was dislodged during a thunderstorm and fell onto Macalister Road. Two persons were killed – Indian national Jahir Hussain Sulaiman and local hawker Lim Chin Aik. Lim's car was crushed by the debris, leaving an 8 m (26 ft) deep crater on the road. Search efforts were halted after five days due to concerns about the stability of surrounding buildings. Subsequent road repairs left Lim's remains buried under the road. The incident also prompted inquiries into the building's structural integrity, as allegations of illegal construction surfaced.

The building continued to be embroiled in controversy in the years since. In 2015, the Penang Island City Council (MBPP) attempted to remove the tower's marquee, citing its illegal placement atop water pipeworks. This action was opposed by members of UMNO, which was by then the opposition following the 2008 state election. The election resulted in Pakatan Rakyat (now Pakatan Harapan) assuming power in Penang. This incident caused a dispute over the building's marquee between UMNO and the city council, which was under the purview of the Pakatan Rakyat-controlled state government.

Following the 2018 general election which resulted in UMNO losing federal power for the first time in Malaysia's history, the building was renamed JKP Tower. According to local media reports, UMNO's defeat and the loss of federal power led to significant management changes, prompting the renaming of the tower.

== Description ==
The 21-storey JKP Tower was the first office building in Malaysia to integrate bioclimatic features such as wing walls, variable shading and individual balconies for each floor. The building is oriented northwest–southeast.

== See also ==
- List of tallest buildings in George Town
