= Robot-assisted double heart valve replacement =

The first robot-assisted double heart valve replacement was carried out in the Chennai region of India at Chettinad Health City. This is the first instance of such a procedure using robotic surgery. The surgery was carried out by Dr R. Ravi Kumar, the director of the Institute of Cardiovascular Disease and head of the Robotic Surgery Centre at Chettinad.
