= Mount Elizabeth Hospital =

Private hospital in Singapore

- Parkway Pantai
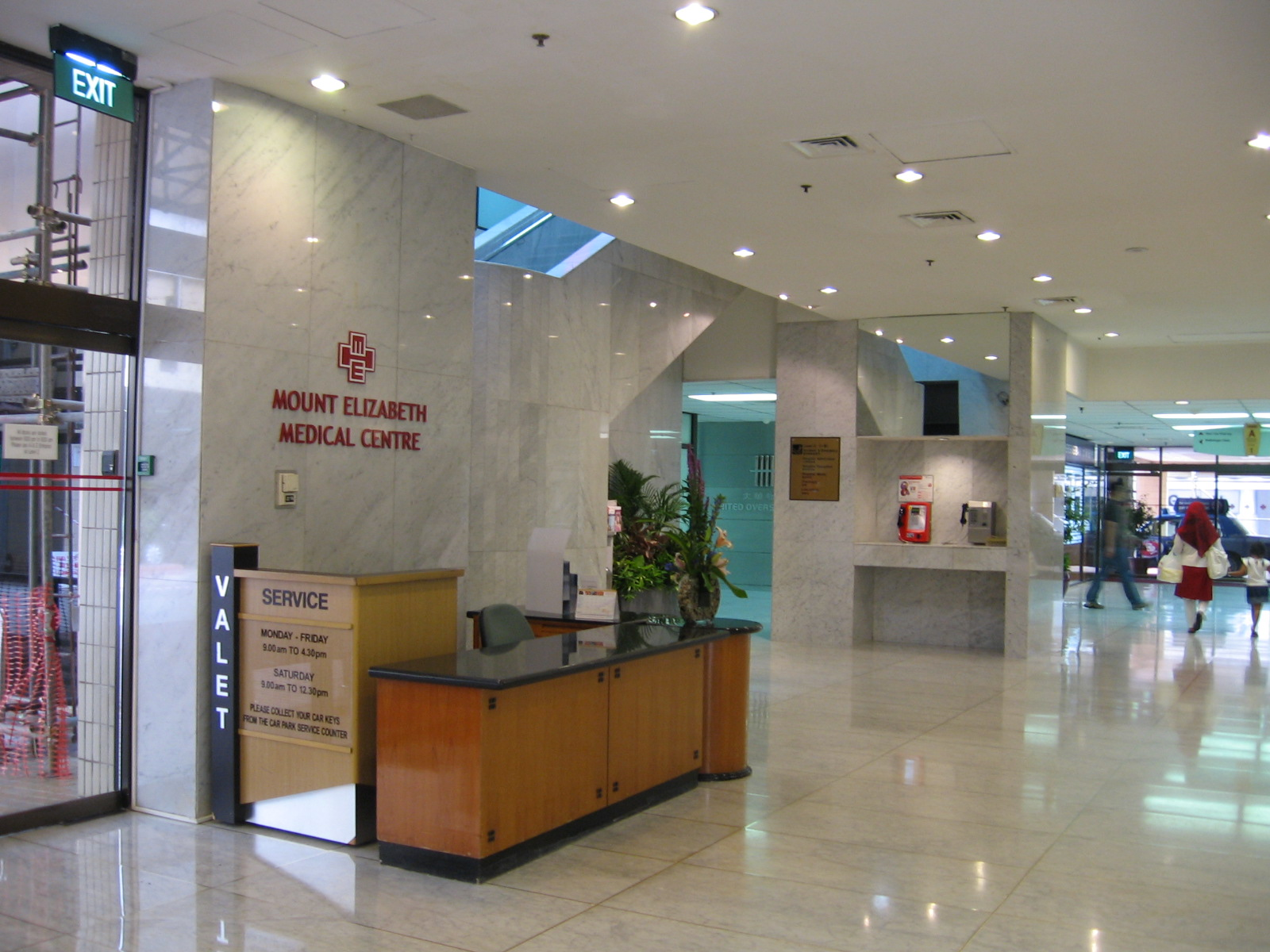

Geography
- Location: 3 Mount Elizabeth, Singapore 228510
- Coordinates: 1°18′16.2″N 103°50′06.3″E

Organisation
- Type: General

Services
- Standards: Joint Commission International
- Emergency department: Yes
- Beds: 345

History
- Founded: 8 December 1979; 46 years ago

Links
- Website: mountelizabeth.com.sg

Mount Elizabeth Hospital, known colloquially as Mount E, is a 345-bed private hospital in Singapore operated by Parkway Pantai. Construction began in 1976 and the hospital officially opened on 8 December 1979. The hospital specialises in cardiology, oncology, and neuroscience, among other tertiary services. It is also recognised as a multi-organ transplant speciality hospital. Since 1995, it has been owned by Parkway Holdings Ltd.

The hospital is accredited by Joint Commission International and is located in Singapore's Orchard Road, on Mount Elizabeth. It is the first private hospital in Singapore to perform open-heart surgery and to establish a nuclear medicine centre.

The royal family of Brunei built a Royal Suite in the hospital for their own use. It was later made available for use by other patients.

== Specialities ==
The adjacent Mount Elizabeth Medical Centre (MEMC) houses clinics with private medical specialists only. Doctors have to be specialists accredited by the Singapore Medical Council in order to practice at Mount Elizabeth Medical Centre.

They practice in 31 specialities in total, including anaesthesiology (e.g. Adrian Ng Anaesthesia Pte Ltd, Anaesthesia Unlimited, and Chiu & Ngo Anaesthetic Practice), cardiology (e.g. ACE Cardiology Clinic Pte Ltd, The Harley Street Heart & Vascular Centre, and Nair Cardiac & Medical Centre).

cardiothoracic surgery (e.g. C H Lim Thoracic Cardiovascular Surgery, M.C. Tong Cardiothoracic Surgery Centre, and Wong Poo Sing Heart and Lung Surgery Clinic Pte Ltd), dental specialties (e.g. Chew & Chew Dental Surgery, Mount Elizabeth Dental Surgery Pte Ltd, and OMS Surgeon Pte Ltd).

Endocrinology (e.g. Alex Fok Endocrine Practice, Peter Eng Endocrine Clinic, and Surgery A Pte Ltd), gastroenterology (e.g. AliveoMedical, GastroClinic, and Digestive Centre), general surgery (e.g. Aelius Surgical Centre, Alpine Surgical Practice, and Ark Surgical Practice), medical oncology (e.g. Icon Cancer Centre Orchard, Mow Blood & Cancer Clinic, and Parkway Cancer Centre), neurology (Capernaum Neurology Pte Ltd, Lee Kim En Neurology Pte Ltd, and Nei Neurology Clinic Pte Ltd).

Obstetrics and gynaecology (e.g. Cheng Clinic For Women Pte Ltd, Dr Claudia Chi Women's Clinic, and Gyn Endoscopy Pte Ltd), orthopaedic surgery (e.g. Arete Orthopedic Centre, Auspicium Orthopaedic Centre, and Bose Bone Joint & Spine Clinic.

Otorhinolaryngology (Lim Ing Ruen ENT Clinic, Advanced Sinus & Skull Base Centre – ENT, and Aspire Ear Nose Throat and Snoring Clinic), paediatric medicine (e.g. Belinda's Clinic for Children, Chiang Children's Allergy & Asthma Clinic, and The Child and Allergy Clinic), plastic surgery (e.g. Aesthetic & Reconstructive Centre, AZATACA Plastic Surgery, and Harry Fok Surgery), renal medicine (e.g. Kidney Health Asia, One Future Kidney Care, and The Kidney Clinic), respiratory medicine (e.g. CHESTMED PTE LTD, Cough & Chest Specialist Pte Ltd, and The Respiratory Practice), and urology (e.g. Advanced Urology Associates Pte Ltd, Png Urology Pte Ltd, and E C Tan Urology).

The medical centre caters to patients of all ages from Singapore, Southeast Asia, and international patients from all countries visiting Singapore. Staff who understand multiple languages such as Indonesian, Russian, and Malay are available on-site to provide translations.

There are two locations of Mount Elizabeth Hospital. The first location, Mount Elizabeth Orchard, is situated at 3 Mount Elizabeth, Singapore 228510, while the second location, Mount Elizabeth Novena, is located at 38 Irrawaddy Road, Singapore 329563.

== Mount Elizabeth Novena Hospital ==
This hospital is a 313-bed healthcare facility that opened on 2 July 2012. It is owned by Parkway Pantai.

Featuring more than 250 specialist physician suites and tertiary medical treatments, it offers private medical suites ranging in size from 452 square feet (42.0 m^{2}) to 1,431 square feet (132.9 m^{2}) in size. Prices ranged from between S$3,588 per square foot and S$3,828 per square foot. About 30% of the patients are medical tourists.
