= Gleneagles Hospital =

- Parkway Pantai

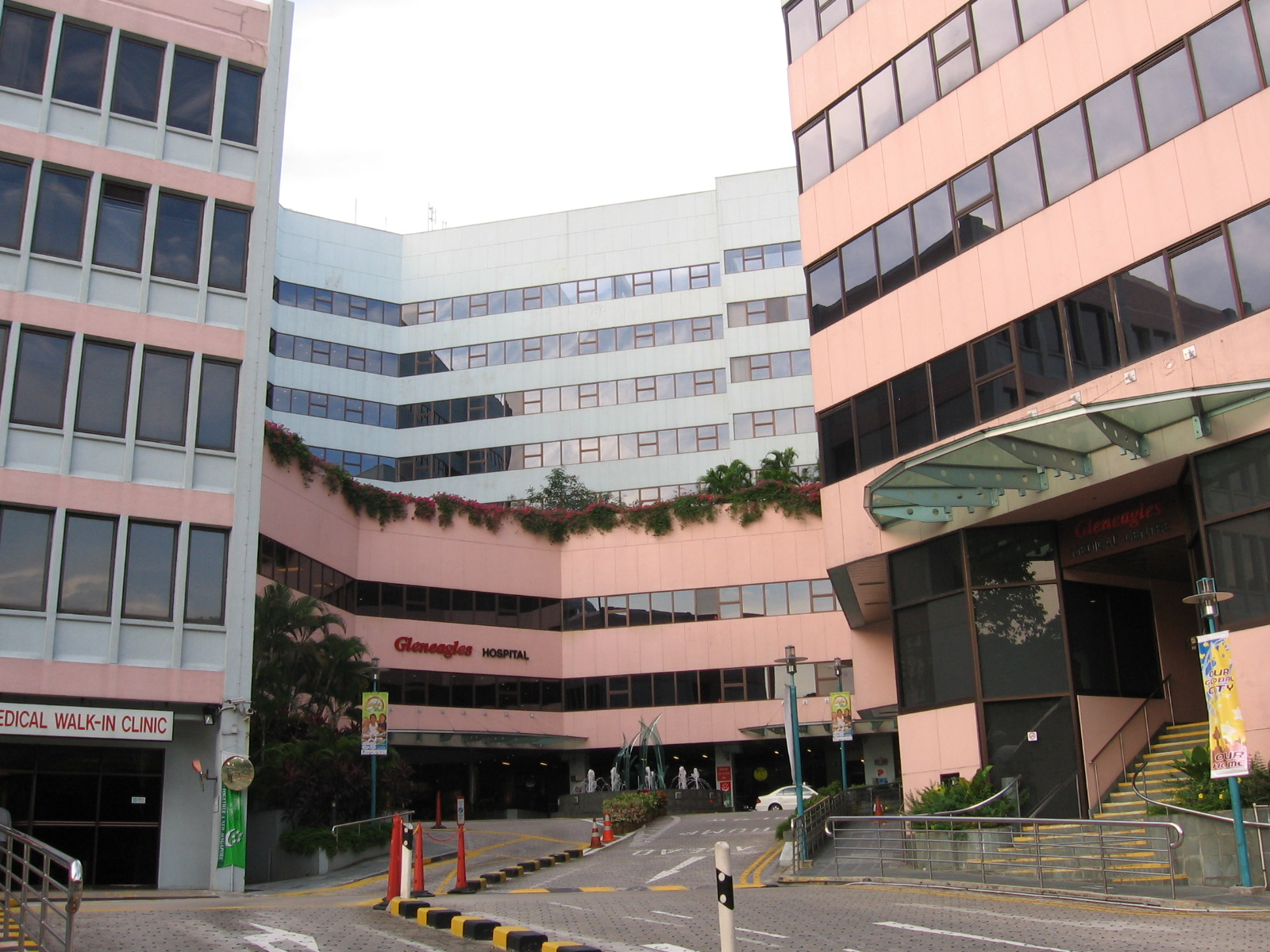
- The hospital in 2006

Geography
- Location: 6A Napier Road, Singapore 258500
- Coordinates: 1°18′26.0″N 103°49′11.0″E

Organisation
- Type: General

Services
- Standards: Joint Commission International
- Beds: 258

History
- Founded: 1957; 69 years ago

Links
- Website: www.gleneagles.com.sg

Gleneagles Hospital is a private hospital on Napier Road, Singapore, next to Napier MRT station. It provides medical and surgical services. It is part of Parkway Pantai, a subsidiary of the Malaysian–Singaporean private healthcare group IHH Healthcare.

== History ==
In 1957, Gleneagles Hospital was started by The British European Association as a 45-bed nursing home. On 16 January 1958, Gleneagles Nursing Home was incorporated as a private company and known as Gleneagles Hospital Limited. It opened its doors as a hospital on 8 June 1959. From 1979 to 1980, it developed into a 126-bed "medical center" that provided a wide range of medical services.

In May 1987, Parkway Holdings acquired Gleneagles Hospital for S$46 million and expanded it from 1988 to 1991. The hospital was modernised at a cost of $150 million. Its new additions were a 10-storey hospital block, 14 operating theaters, and 150 consulting suites. Its range of services grew to include hospital management and consultancy services. In 1993, Gleneagles became a tertiary care hospital, growing to 150 medical specialists a year later. In 1997, it developed into a 380-bed institution.

At present, there are more than 160 specialists in over 30 specialties.

== Awards and innovations ==
Gleneagles Hospital was awarded the Joint Commission International Accreditation (JCI) in 2006, certifying that the hospital satisfies the international standard of care and hospital management, with the Gold Seal of Approval.

In 2002 the Asian American Liver Center in Gleneagles Hospital became the first hospital in South East Asia to perform a living donor liver transplant for children, a high-risk but potentially life-saving procedure. The Asian American Liver Center uses modern technology which helps doctors reconstruct liver anatomy from CT scans, facilitating more accurate diagnosis and precision in operations.

== Partnerships ==
Gleneagles has partnerships with Johns Hopkins University in the United States, Thames Valley University in the United Kingdom, Curtin University of Technology and La Trobe University in Australia. In July 2013, in response to the surge in dengue cases, Gleneagles Hospital collaborated with public hospital Changi General Hospital, using its beds to accommodate public hospital patients.

== Controversies ==
In 2013 a patient, Li Siu Lun, 54, sued Gleneagles Hospital and was awarded S$250,000 in damages, compensatory damages of $10,000 and $240,000 aggravated damages for distress. He claimed that the hospital conspired with a private practitioner, Looi Kok Poh, to make Li undergo additional surgery in order to cover up a botched hand operation. Li claimed that Gleneagles Hospital had altered his consent form and medical records in order to help Looi cover up his negligence. On appeal by Gleneagles and counter-appeal, general damages of $21,000 and aggravated damages of $42,000 were awarded.

== See also ==
- Mochtar Riady
- Robert Mugabe, who died in Gleneagles Hospital on 6 September 2019
- Ciputra, who died in Gleneagles Hospital on 27 November 2019
