= Macalister Road, George Town =

Road in the Malaysian state of Penang

Macalister Road
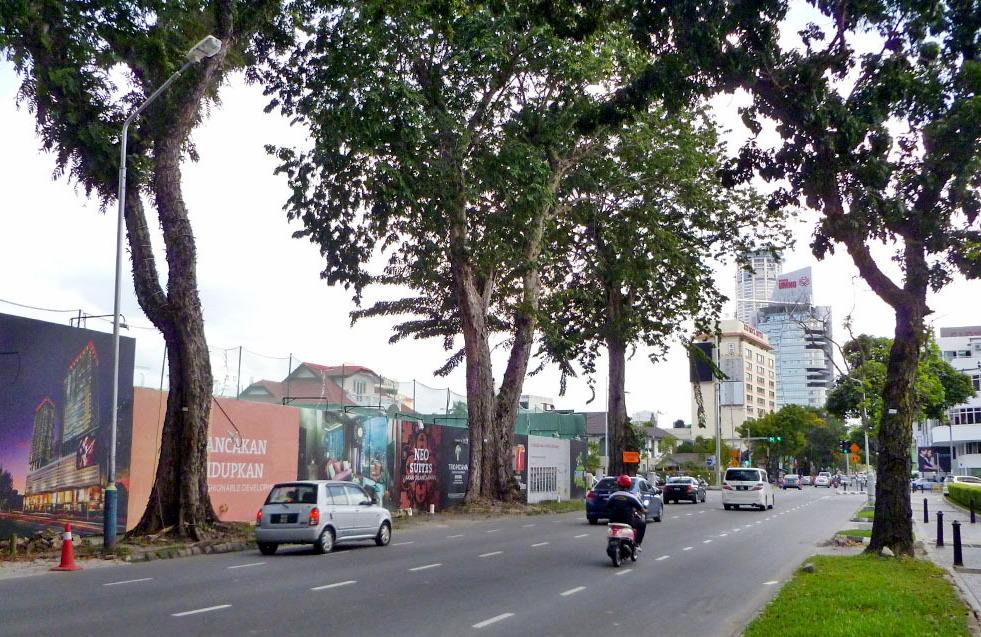
- Native name: Malay: Jalan Macalister; Chinese: 中路
- Maintained by: Penang Island City Council
- Location: George Town
- Coordinates: 5.41504°N 100.326703°E
- West end: Western Road
- East end: Magazine Circus (next to Komtar)

Construction
- Inauguration: Early 19th century
- JALAN MACALISTER Macalister Rd10400 P. PINANG

Macalister Road is a major thoroughfare in the city of George Town within the Malaysian state of Penang. The road stretches out of Magazine Circus next to Komtar towards Western Road, a leafier enclave within the city centre.

The road was named after one of the Governors of Penang in the early 19th century. Originally a dirt track, the eastern section of Macalister Road has become urbanised as part of the city centre. Notably, the westernmost section of Macalister Road still retains a quieter, greener character, with mature Angsana trees providing shade along this particular section of the road.

== Etymology ==
Macalister Road was named in honour of a Scotsman, Colonel Norman Macalister, who served as the Governor of the Prince of Wales Island (now Penang Island) between 1808 and 1810.

== History ==
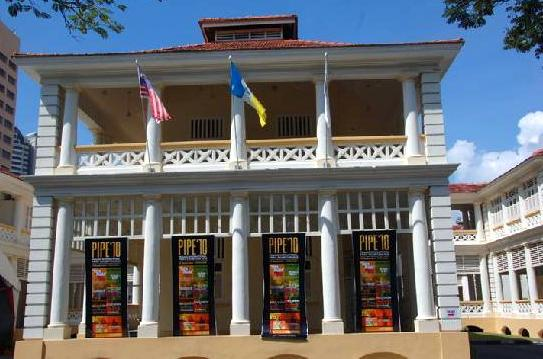
Formerly the King Edward VII Memorial Hospital, this building has been converted into a branch of the Penang State Museum.

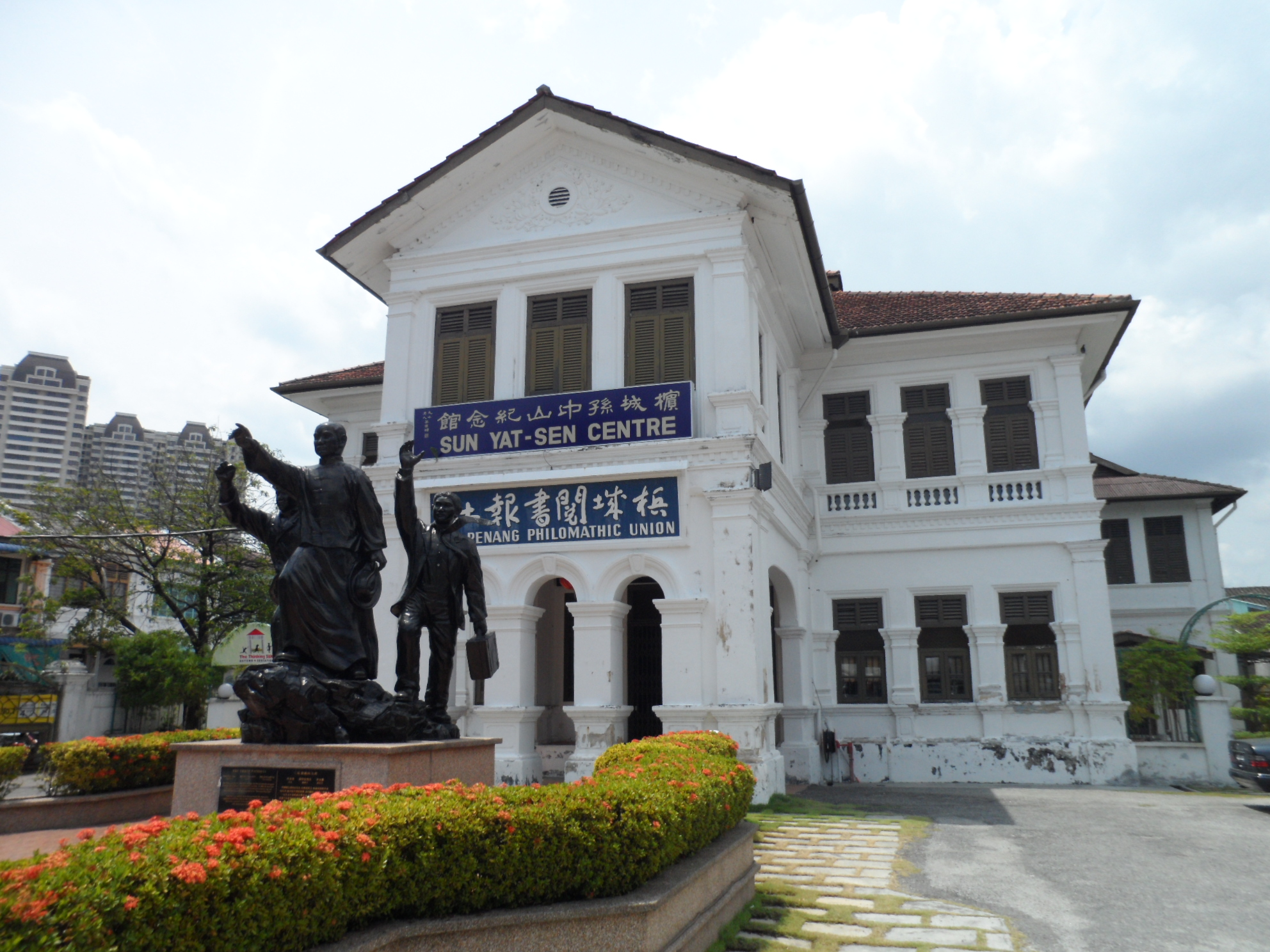
Sun Yat-sen Memorial Centre

During the colonial era, the Europeans tended to build their residences at Macalister Road. Tall Angsana trees were planted along the westernmost section of Macalister Road by Charles Curtis, who was the curator of the Penang Botanic Gardens in the late 19th century. In addition to the Angsana trees, a baobab tree, planted by Captain Speedy, was planted at this section of Macalister Road as well and still remains at the same spot to this day; it is one of the only three baobab trees in Penang.

Among the European residences at this particular stretch of Macalister Road are the Mayfair, Union Villa and Seri Teratai, the latter of which is the official residence of the Chief Minister of Penang. St. George's Girls School, one of the premier English schools in Penang, was relocated to its present grounds at this stretch of Macalister Road in 1954.

Further east, the King Edward VII Memorial Hospital, named after King Edward VII who was the British monarch between 1901 and 1910, was completed in 1915. This maternity hospital was in operation until 1955; the building now houses a branch of the Penang State Museum and Art Gallery.

In 2013, a thunderstorm led to the collapse of the spire of Menara Umno, a high-rise at the eastern section of Macalister Road.

== Landmarks ==
- Seri Teratai
- King Edward VII Memorial Hospital (now Penang State Museum and Art Gallery branch)
- Sun Yat-sen Memorial Centre
- JKP Tower

== Education ==
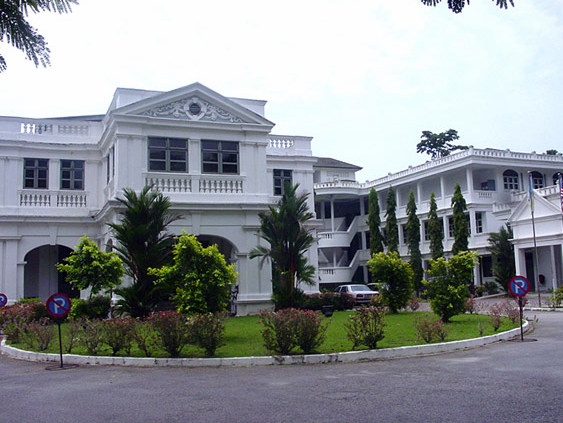
DISTED College was founded in 1987 as the first Penang-based private tertiary institution.

- St. George's Girls' School
- St. Christopher's International Primary School
- Hua Xia International School
- DISTED College

== Health care ==
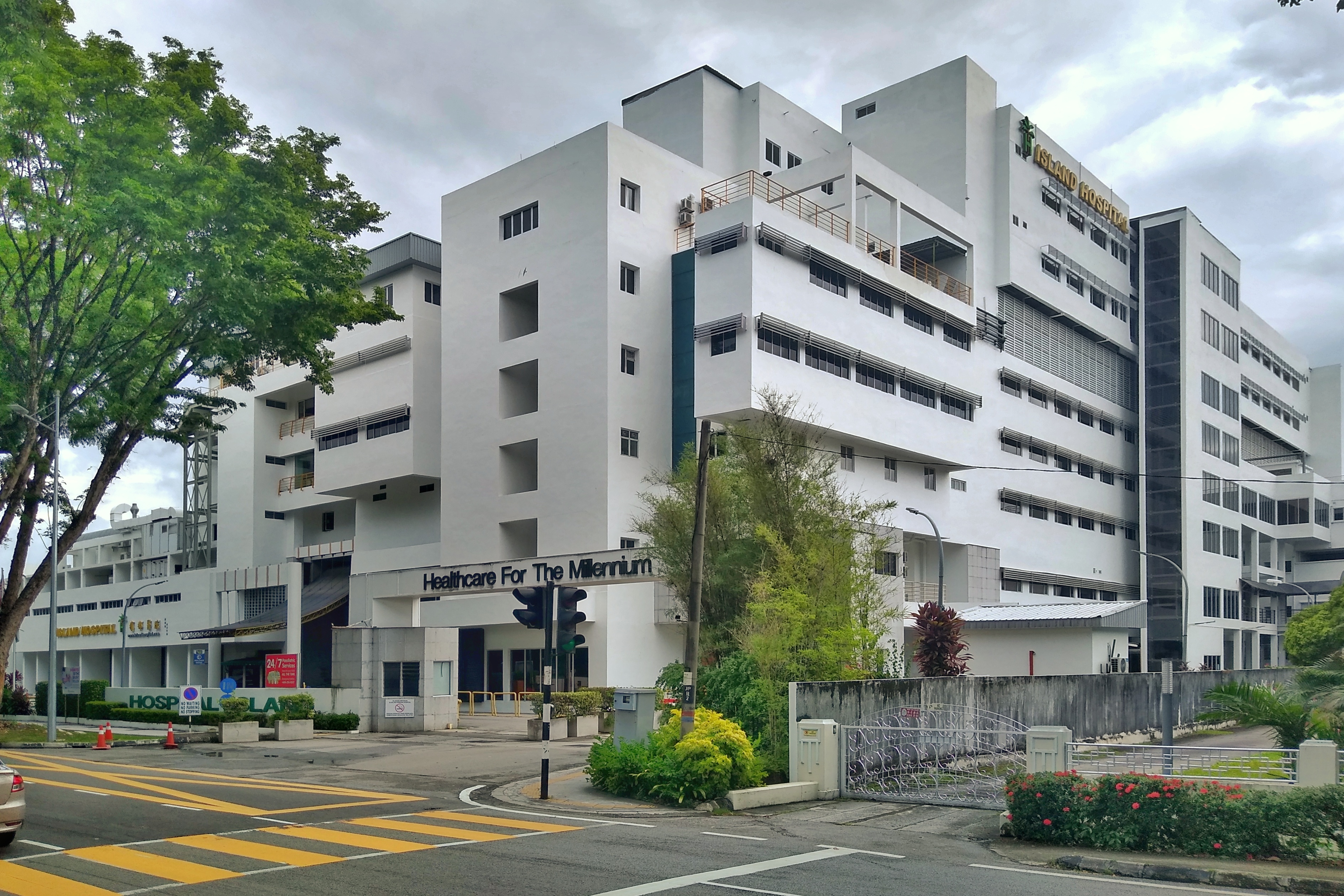
Island Hospital viewed from Macalister Road

- Loh Guan Lye Specialists Centre
- Island Hospital

== See also ==
- List of roads in George Town
