= Cluster Schools of Excellence =

The Cluster School of Excellence is a merit system implemented in Malaysia, granted to high-achieving schools. Launched in 2007 by the Ministry of Education as part of the Malaysian National Education Blueprint (NEB) for the years 2006–2010, the cluster school initiative gives wider autonomy in administration and additional allocation for the advancement of specific fields such as academics, sports, and extra-curricular activities for schools selected and placed under certain "clusters of excellence."

== Definition ==
The Cluster School of Excellence is a designation given to schools identified as excellent in their respective clusters, based on factors such as school administration and student achievement. One of the six core strategies in the National Education Blueprint is to foster a culture of excellence within the Malaysian education system by establishing "Cluster Schools of Excellence." The selection criteria for these schools are based on specific fields, including academic, co-curricular, and sports achievements. These schools serve as models that can be emulated by other schools within the same cluster and even outside of it.
