= Parkway Pantai =

Medical company based in Singapore

- Company type: Limited company
- Industry: Healthcare
- Headquarters: Singapore
- Area served: Asia, Middle East, Europe
- Parent: IHH Healthcare
- Website: www.parkwaypantai.com

Parkway Pantai, Ltd. is a medical company based in Singapore and is Southeast Asia's largest private healthcare provider, and one of the largest in Asia. It is a wholly owned subsidiary of Kuala Lumpur-based IHH Healthcare, whose largest shareholder is Malaysian state investment agency Khazanah Nasional. Parkway Pantai operates private hospitals in Singapore, Brunei, Mainland China, Hong Kong, Malaysia, India, Vietnam and the United Arab Emirates. IHH Healthcare also owns the International Medical University. In July 2017, According to the reports, Parkway Pantai issued a US$2 billion multicurrency bond to refinance its debts.

== Background ==
Parkway Pantai owns a network of 21 hospitals, including four private hospitals in Singapore and more than 60 medical centres, clinics, and ancillary healthcare facilities in Singapore, Hong Kong, Malaysia, India and China. It also has a network of regional hospitals in Malaysia, India and Brunei, including Jerudong Park Medical Centre. A number of health-tourism providers work with Parkway Pantai's hospitals to develop medical tourism. It has more than 4,000 licensed beds in aggregate.

The Group's other healthcare network in Singapore includes Parkway Shenton Pte Ltd, one of Singapore's biggest general practices; ParkwayHealth Radiology, a leading radiology service provider; and ParkwayHealth Laboratory, a major provider of laboratory services locally.

Some of Parkway's hospitals are subjected to international healthcare accreditation, while others are not.

=== Hospitals ===
- Parkway East Hospital
- Gleneagles Hospital
- Mount Elizabeth Hospital
- Mount Elizabeth Novena Hospital
- Gleneagles Kuala Lumpur
- Gleneagles Penang
- Gleneagles Kota Kinabalu
- Gleneagles Medini
- Gleneagles Hong Kong
- Pantai Hospital Ampang
- Pantai Hospital Ayer Keroh
- Pantai Hospital Batu Pahat
- Pantai Hospital Cheras
- Pantai Hospital Ipoh
- Pantai Hospital Klang
- Pantai Hospital Kuala Lumpur
- Pantai Hospital Manjung
- Pantai Hospital Penang
- Pantai Hospital Sungai Petani
- Gleneagles JPMC
- Gleneagles Global Health City, Chennai
- Gleneagles Global Hospitals, Bengaluru
- Gleneagles Global Hospitals, Hyderabad
- Apollo Gleneagles Hospital
- Shanghai International Medical Center

== History ==
Parkway Holdings Limited began operating as a subsidiary of Parkway Pantai Limited in August 2010.
