= August Huttenbach =

German industrialist (1850-1918

The Honourable August Huttenbach
- Born: 19 October 1850; Worms, Germany
- Died: 12 November 1918 (aged 68); London
- Occupations: Industrialist and merchant
- Years active: 1872 – 1914
- Organization(s): Huttenbach Brothers & Co.
- Children: 1 son

August Huttenbach (19 October 1850 – 12 November 1918) was a German industrialist and merchant operating from Penang, and member of the Legislative Council of the Straits Settlements.

== Early life and education ==
Huttenbach, was born in Worms, Germany, on 19 October 1850 , the son of S. Huttenbach, a manufacturer. He was educated at the Latin College, Worms.

== Career ==
Huttenbach joined the Hessian Guards in 1870, aged 20, on the outbreak of the Franco-Prussian War, and saw fighting at Mars-la-Tour, Gravelotte, Noiseville, and Orleans.

In 1872, he went to the Straits Settlements, and joined Messrs. Katz Bros in Penang as an assistant. In 1885, he founded Huttenbach Brothers & Co., Pinang and Singapore; Huttenbach, Liebert & Co., Pinang, and Huttenbach and Co., London, with his brother Ludwig. He was active in shipping, trading, retail, and engineering projects, and had interests in the tin mining and rubber industries.

He is also credited with modernising the infrastructure of Penang. He was the first to introduce petroleum street lamps, at his own expense in Beach Street, replacing coconut oil lamps. Subsequently, his firm was appointed contractor for street lighting to the Municipality in 1887, and later organised the introduction of gas street lighting, and then electricity in many parts of Malaya.

His Penang shipping business, started the first service to the Acheen ports supplying the Dutch military, and the first steam service to the Coromandel Coast. He created the first all British mail line from Europe to the Straits Settlements via India, and established the first steam service between Penang and Selangor.

He was a member of the Legislative Council of the Straits Settlements serving from 1894 to 1896, and from 1905 to 1906. He was among the first to agitate for a new currency linked to the Gold Standard, delivered many speeches, and published a book, The Silver Standard and the Straits Currency Question, becoming "an authority on the currency question".

He was a prominent member of the Penang community where he resided for most of his career, and a noted philanthropist who supported local hospitals and schools. He was appointed by Italy and the United States as their consular agent. In 1914, he retired from business and public life, left Penang, and settled in England.

== Personal life and death ==
In 1889, Huttenberg was naturalised as British subject.

He married twice. First in 1870, to Louisa Cammilla Walker with whom he had a son. After she died in 1892, he married Clare Trevylyan in 1904.

Huttenbach died in London on 12 November 1918, aged 68.

== Honours ==
- Militair Verdienst Kreuz in 1870.
- Order of Cavaliere Corona d'Italia in 1893.
