= Penang State Museum and Art Gallery =

Art museum in George Town, Penang, Malaysia

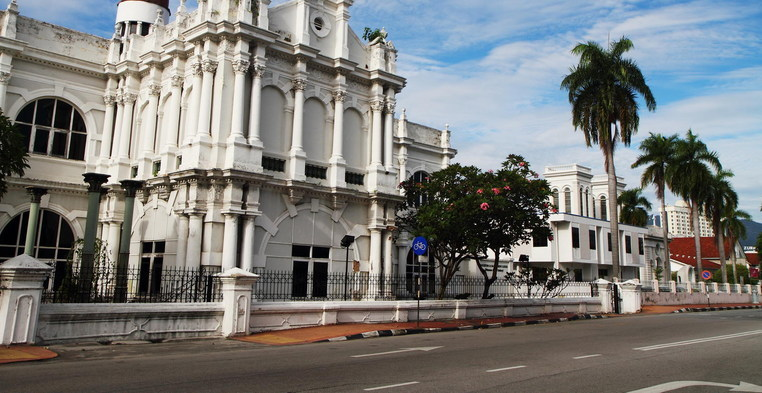

- Location within Penang Location within Malaysia
- Established: 14 April 1965
- Location: George Town, Penang, Malaysia.
- Coordinates: 5.4204563°N 100.3364872°E
- Type: Art
- Owner: Penang State Museum Board
- Website: www.penangmuseum.gov.my

The Penang State Museum and Art Gallery (Malay: Muzium dan Balai Seni Lukis Negeri Pulau Pinang) is a museum and art gallery in George Town, Penang, Malaysia.

== History ==
The museum building used to house the Penang Free School in 1821–1927. After Penang Free School moved to a new building in Green Lane, the Hutchings School took over the building in January 1928 and used it until 1960. The museum was opened by Yang di-Pertua Negeri of Penang Raja Uda Raja Muhammad on 14 April 1965. The building was declared a heritage building under the 2005 Heritage Act.

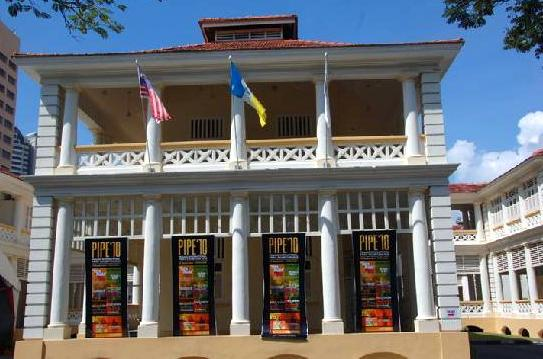
Macalister Road branch

In April 2017, major renovation works started at the museum. It is estimated that the RM20million restoration project will take three years; during which the museum's artifacts are to be temporarily moved to the museum's branch at Macalister Road, George Town. A new building is also planned to be erected on a piece of land next to the museum that has been vacant since it was bombed during World War II.

== Operating hours ==
Management of Penang State Museum Board (Official Office). No. 57, Jalan Macalister, 10400 George Town, Pulau Pinang. Opens Monday to Friday, from 9:00 AM – 5:00 PM

Penang State Museum (Farquhar Street) Opens Saturday to Thursday, from 9:00 AM – 5:00 PM (Closed on Friday & Public Holidays*)

Penang State Museum and Art Gallery. No. 57, Jalan Macalister, 10400 George Town, Pulau Pinang. Opens Saturday to Thursday, from 9:00 AM – 5:00 PM (Closed on Friday & Public Holidays*)

Automotive Gallery at No. 57, Macalister Road Opens Saturday to Thursday, from 9:00 AM – 5:00 PM (Closed on Friday & Public Holidays*)

*Public Holiday(Hari Raya Aidilfitri, Hari Raya Aidiladha & Chinese New Year)

== See also ==
- List of museums in Malaysia
