= Gleneagles Hospital Kuala Lumpur =

Geography
- Location: Jalan Ampang, Kuala Lumpur, Malaysia
- Coordinates: 3°9′40.554″N 101°44′21.059″E

Organisation
- Type: District General

Services
- Beds: 376

History
- Founded: 1996

Links
- Website: www.gleneagles.com.my/kuala-lumpur/
- Lists: Hospitals in Malaysia

Gleneagles Hospital Kuala Lumpur (GKL) (previously known as Gleneagles Intan Medical Centre) is a private hospital in Kuala Lumpur, Malaysia. The hospital was founded in 1996, and commenced its operations on 1 August 1996. GKL is a subsidiary of Pantai Medical Centre Sdn Bhd, which is owned by IHH Healthcare, which owns three other Gleneagles hospitals in Malaysia.

== Operation ==
It is often frequented by the rich and famous. In the 1990s it cost S$1,000 per night just for a bed.

It won an award for Excellence in Customer Service at the 2015 International Medical Travel Journal Medical Travel Awards 2015 when Malaysia was Medical Travel Destination of the Year.

The Society for the Sabah Heart Fund sponsors children's heart surgery at the hospital.

== Outreach ==
It supports the Pink Pit Stop Breast Cancer Awareness campaign, taking stalls to local shopping malls and the government proposal to provide free nutritious breakfast for poorer children.

Cardiologists from the hospital work voluntarily on a rota at the charitable Cardiac Diagnostic and Treatment Centre at Jalan Sultan Azlan Shah.

== New Annexe ==
In 2015, GKL has expanded its operational infrastructure by opening a new annexe. The 9-storey building situated next to the main building.
