= IHH Healthcare =

Private healthcare group

IHH Healthcare Berhad
- Type: Public company
- Traded as: MYX: 5225; SGX: Q0F
- ISIN: MYL5225OO007
- Industry: Healthcare
- Predecessor: Integrated Healthcare Holdings Bhd
- Founded: 1974; 52 years ago
- Headquarters: Kuala Lumpur, Malaysia
- Areas served: Malaysia, Singapore, Turkey, India, Greater China and across Asia and Europe
- Key people: Nik Norzrul Thani (Chairman and independent non-executive director); Prem Kumar Nair (Group chief executive officer)
- Brands: Acibadem, Mount Elizabeth, Gleneagles Pantai, Parkway, Fortis, Prince Court
- Revenue: ▲RM 25.7 billion (2025); RM 24.38 billion (2024); RM 20.93 billion (2023); RM 17.98 billion (2022)
- Number of employees: 70,000
- Subsidiaries: Parkway Pantai, Acıbadem Healthcare Group
- Website: ihhhealthcare.com

IHH Healthcare Berhad (MYX: 5225) is a multinational private healthcare group headquartered in Singapore and Kuala Lumpur, Malaysia. The group operates 190 healthcare facilities, including 89 hospitals, across 10 countries and has a workforce of 76,000 employees across Singapore, Malaysia, Turkey, India, Greater China (including Hong Kong), and other regions of Asia and Europe. It is listed on Bursa Malaysia and the Singapore Exchange.

As of FY24, the largest shareholder of IHH Healthcare is Mitsui of Japan followed by the Malaysian government's sovereign wealth fund Khazanah Nasional and Citigroup of the United States. A further stake is held by the Employees Provident Fund of Malaysia.

The chairman of IHH is Nik Norzrul Thani bin N Hassan Thani.

== See also ==
- Gleneagles Hospital Kuala Lumpur
- Gleneagles Hospital Penang
- Island Hospital
