= Sunshine Central =

Mixed-use complex in George Town, Penang, Malaysia

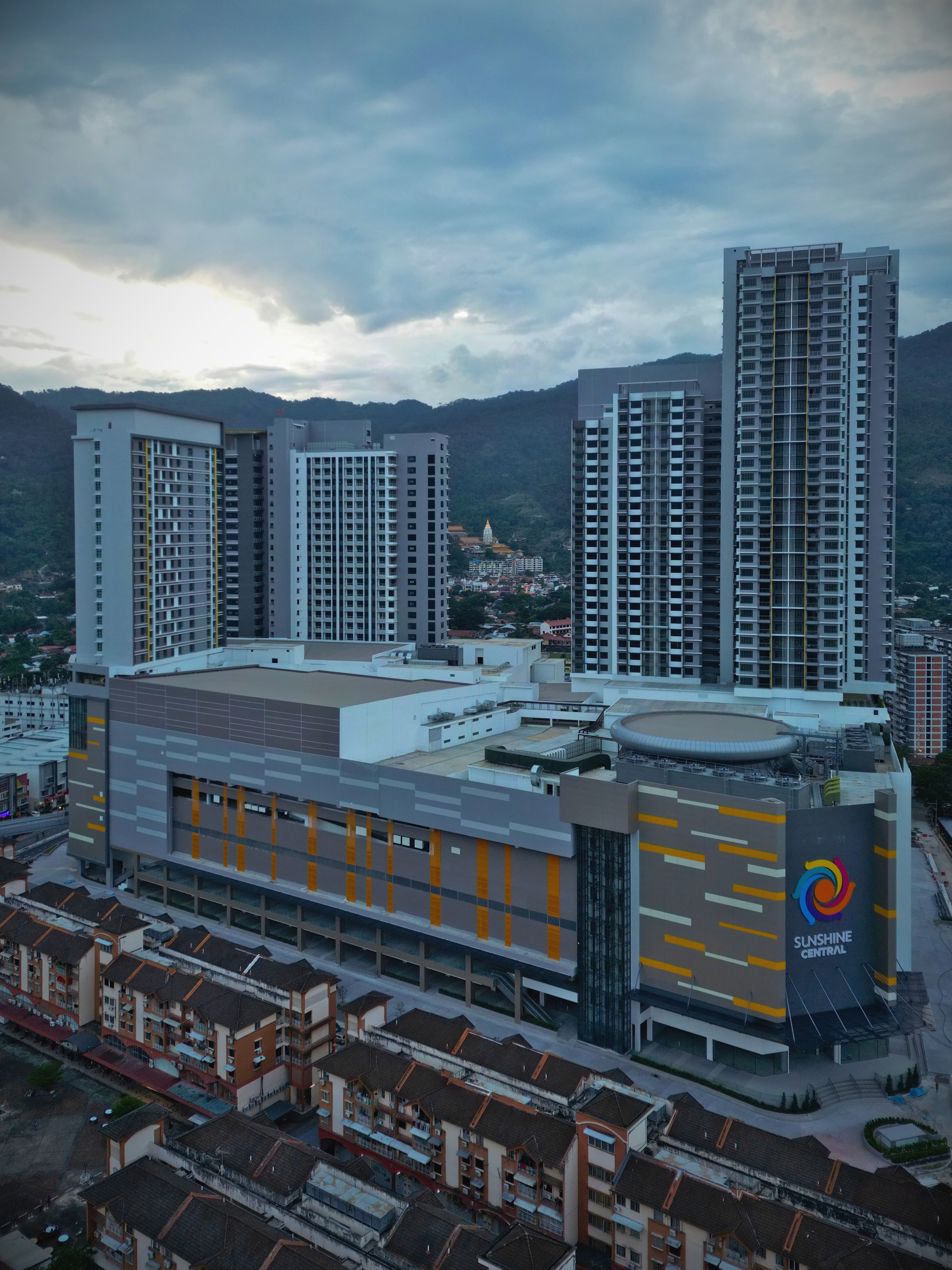
- Interactive map of the Sunshine Central area

General information
- Type: Mixed-use complex
- Location: 8 Lintang Kampung Melayu 1, 11500 Ayer Itam, George Town, Penang, Malaysia
- Coordinates: 5.39875°N 100.28743°E
- Construction started: 2016
- Completed: 2024
- Opened: 2024
- Owner: Suiwah Corporation

Height
- Top floor: 39

Technical details
- Floor count: 39
- Grounds: 3.64 ha (9.0 acres)

Design and construction
- Developer: Crimson Omega

Website
- sunshinecentral.my
- Shopping mall details
- Developer: Crimson Omega
- Stores and services: 412
- Anchor tenants: 1
- Floor area: 820,000 sq ft (76,000 m^{2})
- Floors: 9
- Website: sunshinecentral.my/sunshine-mall/

Sunshine Central is a mixed-use complex within George Town in the Malaysian state of Penang. Situated at the suburb of Ayer Itam, the 3.64 ha (9.0-acre) 39-storey complex comprises a residential tower, an office block, a hotel and a nine-storey shopping mall forming the podium. Owned by local conglomerate Suiwah Corporation, Sunshine Central was opened to the public on 11 October 2024.

== History ==
Sunshine Central was envisioned on a 9-acre (3.6 ha) commercial plot within the neighbourhood of Farlim, with Sunshine Departmental Store, a subsidiary of Suiwah Corporation, being proposed as the anchor tenant of the new shopping mall. Suiwah Corporation had been established in 1961 as a local retail chain operating across Penang, including stores such as Sunshine Square at Bayan Baru. As of 2014, Sunshine Central was estimated to have a gross development value of RM300 million.

Construction began in 2016, with China Machinery Engineering Corporation being awarded the RM40 million contract for earthworks and piling. The project was completed in 2024 and trade shows were planned to mark the 50th anniversary of China's diplomatic ties with Malaysia. Sunshine Central was inaugurated in October that year by Paya Terubong assemblyman and state executive councillor Wong Hon Wai.

== Components ==
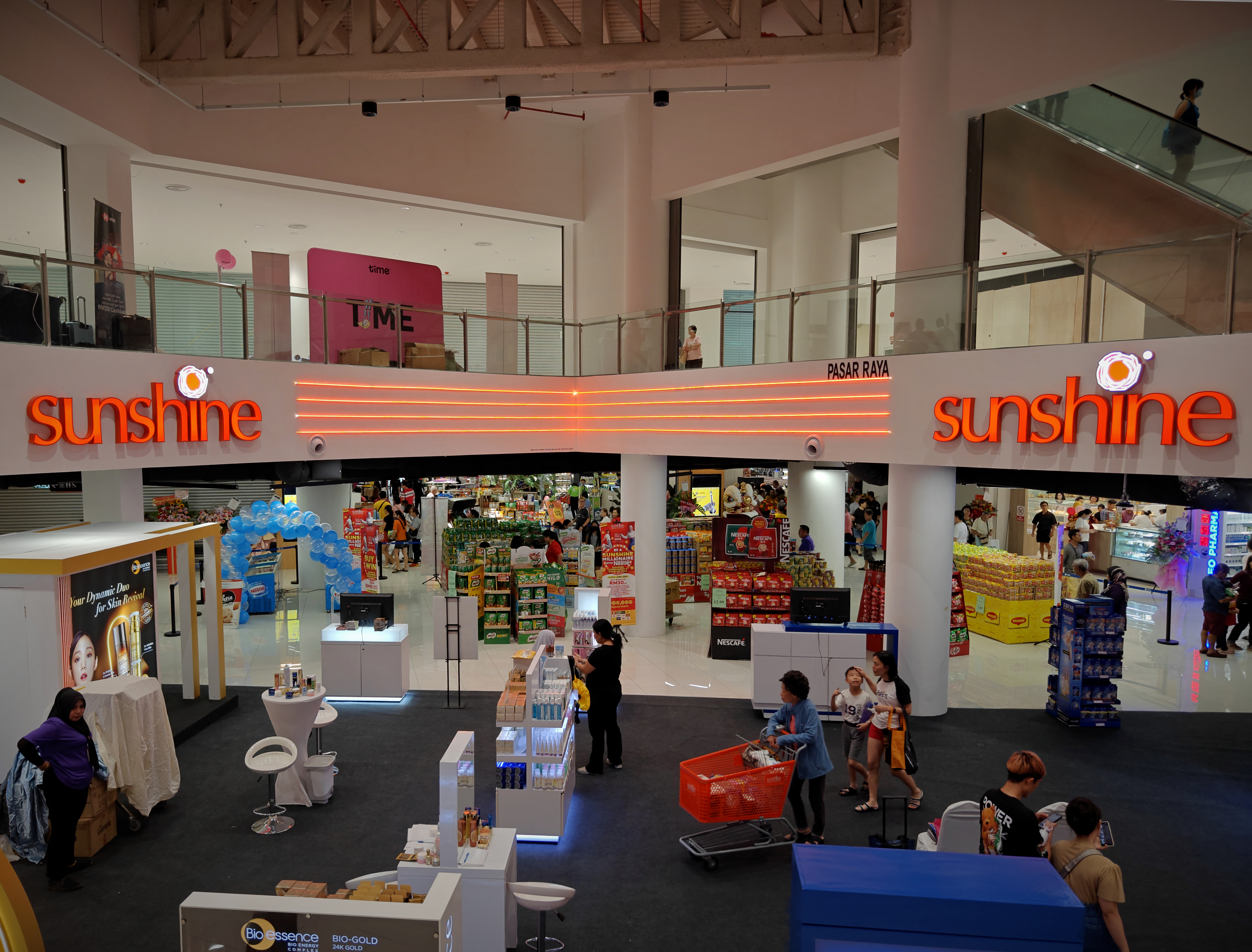
Sunshine Departmental Store at the basement of Sunshine Mall

=== Sunshine Mall ===
Sunshine Mall is a nine-storey shopping mall that forms the podium of the complex. It features 412 retail lots spread out over 820,000 sq ft (76,000 m^{2}) of net lettable area, with Sunshine Departmental Store as its anchor tenant. At the time of its launch, Sunshine Mall was slightly smaller in lettable area than Gurney Plaza^{α} and Queensbay Mall^{β}, the two largest shopping malls in George Town. Golden Screen Cinemas operates an 11-screen cinema within the mall.

=== Sunshine Tower ===
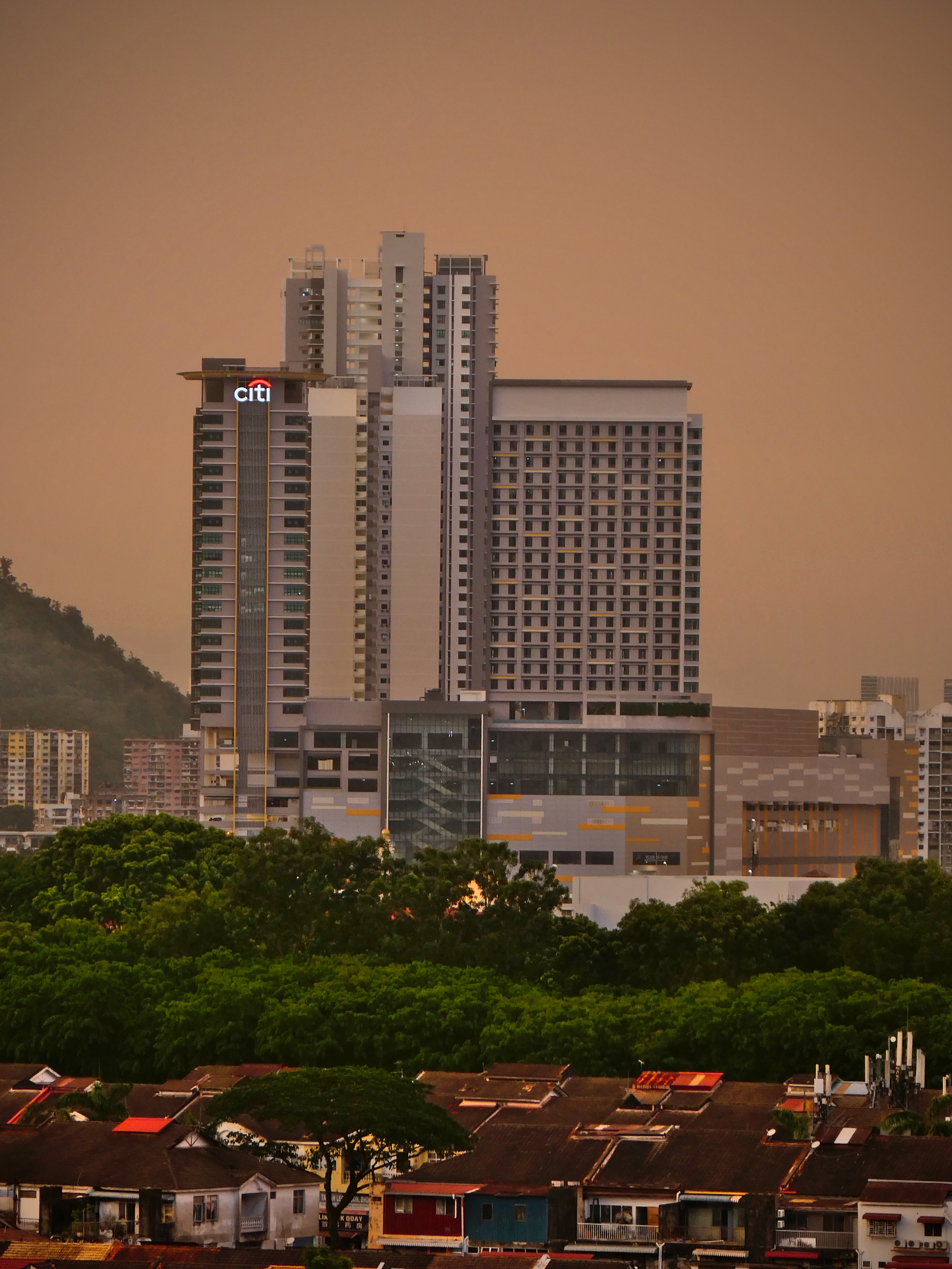
Sunshine Central at dusk

Sunshine Tower is an 18-storey office block equipped with a 5G-enabled data centre and a helipad. The office block is designed as an MSC-compliant building, similar to SUNTECH Tower at Bayan Baru. It contains 227,600 sq ft (21,140 m^{2}) of net lettable area that accommodates 128 office units. Citigroup occupies eight of the floors within the tower.

=== Sunshine Residence ===
Sunshine Residence is a 30-storey condominium containing 270 residential units, ranging from 1,342 sq ft (124.7 m^{2}) to 1,973 sq ft (183.3 m^{2}) per unit.

=== Harris Sunshine Penang ===
Originally named Sunshine World, the 18-storey hotel was acquired by The Ascott Limited, a Singapore-based hospitality company, in 2022. The hotel contains 289 rooms of varying sizes and 33,500 sq ft (3,110 m^{2}) of convention space with a capacity of approximately 1,200.

== Location ==
Sunshine Central is situated on Lintang Kampung Melayu 1 within the neighbourhood of Kampung Melayu in Air Itam. A flyover connects the complex with Jalan Thean Tek, a thoroughfare within Farlim.

== Notes ==
^α Gurney Plaza has a net lettable area of 889,859 sq ft (82,670.6 m^{2}).

^β Queensbay Mall has a net lettable area of 883,111 sq ft (82,043.7 m^{2}) as of 2022.

== See also ==
- List of shopping malls in Malaysia
