= Bayan Lepas =

- Suburb
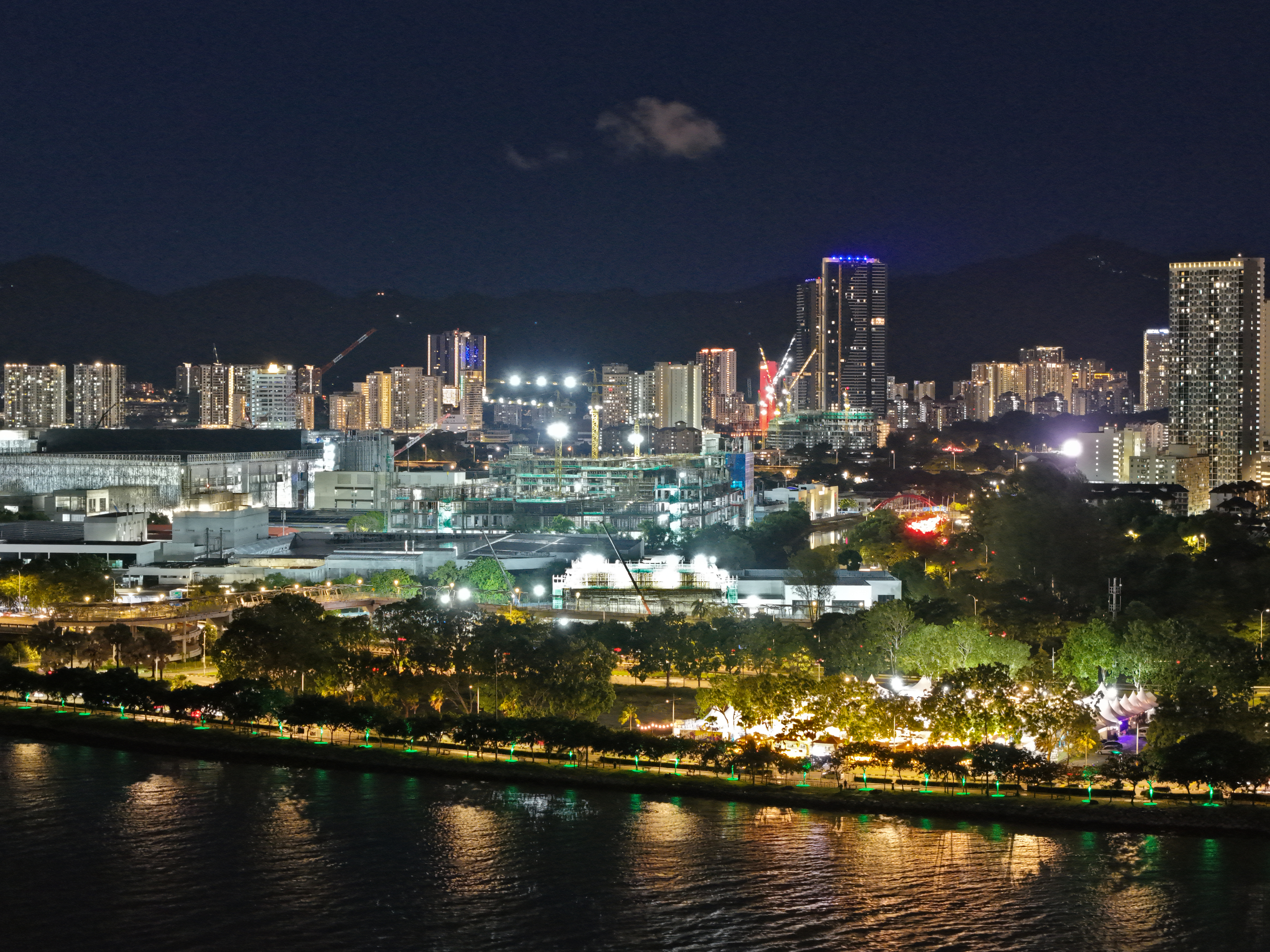
- Interactive map of Bayan Lepas
- Location within George Town in Penang
- Coordinates: 5°17′N 100°16′E
- Country: Malaysia
- State: Penang
- City: George Town
- District: Southwest

Area
  - Total: 31.9 km^{2} (12.3 sq mi)

Population (2020)
  - Total: 130,455
  - Density: 4,090/km^{2} (10,600/sq mi)

Demographics
  - Ethnic groups: 42.7% Bumiputera; 42.2% Malay; 0.5% indigenous groups from Sabah and Sarawak; 40.4% Chinese; 7.0% Indian; 0.5% Other ethnicities; 9.4% Non-citizens
- Time zone: UTC+8 (MST)
  - Summer (DST): Not observed
- Postal code: 11900

Bayan Lepas is a suburb of George Town in the Malaysian state of Penang. Located near the southeastern tip of Penang Island, 15 km (9.3 mi) south of the city centre, it is home to the Penang International Airport, the third busiest airport in Malaysia, as well as one of the oldest free industrial zones in the country.It is the birthplace of Tun Abdullah Ahmad Badawi, Malaysia’s 5th Prime Minister.

Established sometime in the 19th century, Bayan Lepas had been an agricultural village, with rice production as its mainstay. The British built what is now the Penang International Airport in 1935, but it was only in the 1970s when Bayan Lepas witnessed widescale transformation with the creation of the eponymous free industrial zone.

Today, electronics manufacturing and logistics have replaced agriculture as the major economic sectors at Bayan Lepas, while residential and commercial developments have accelerated, including Queensbay Mall, one of the largest shopping malls in George Town.

== History ==
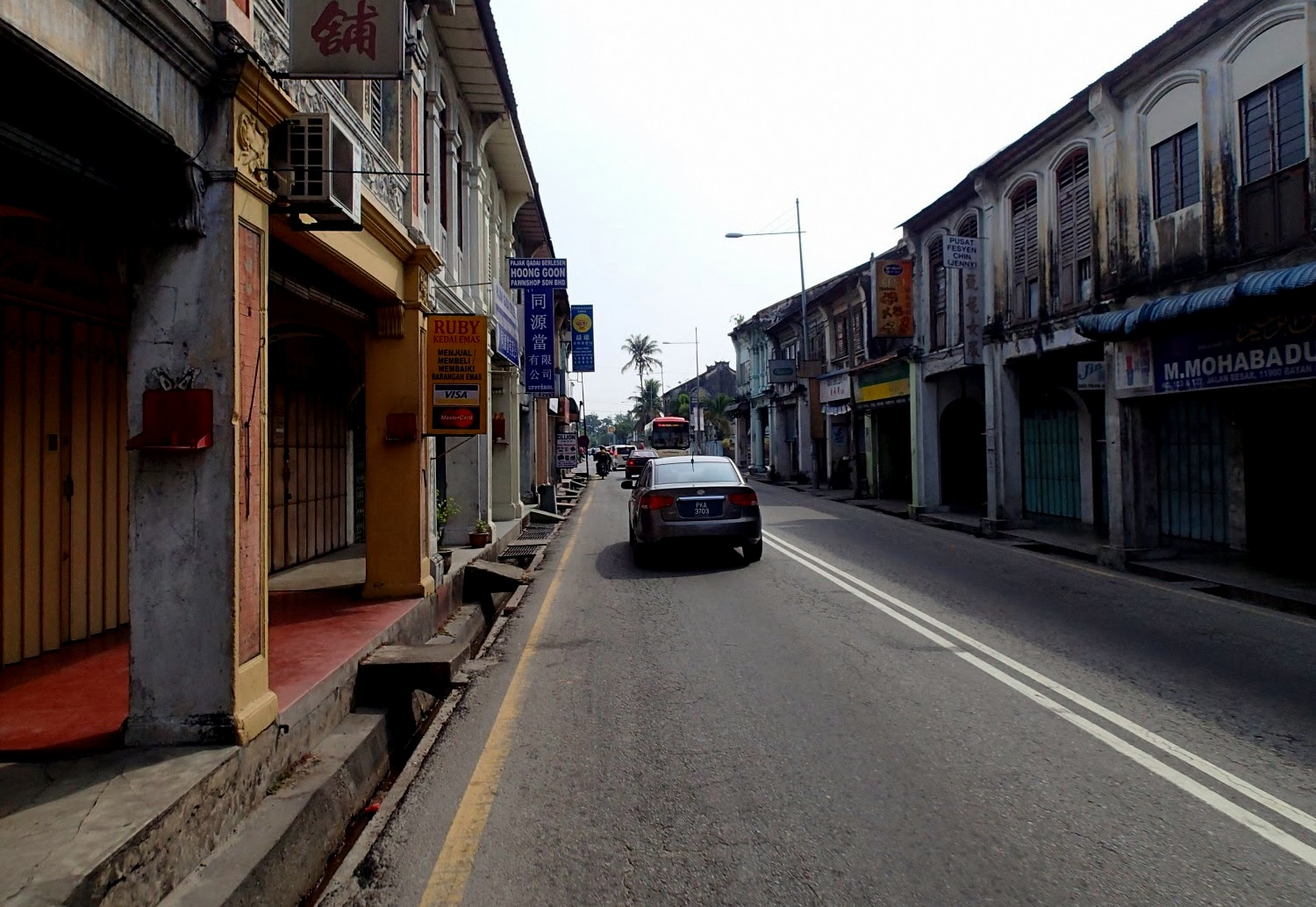
The 'old town' of Bayan Lepas is situated at the southeastern tip of Penang Island.

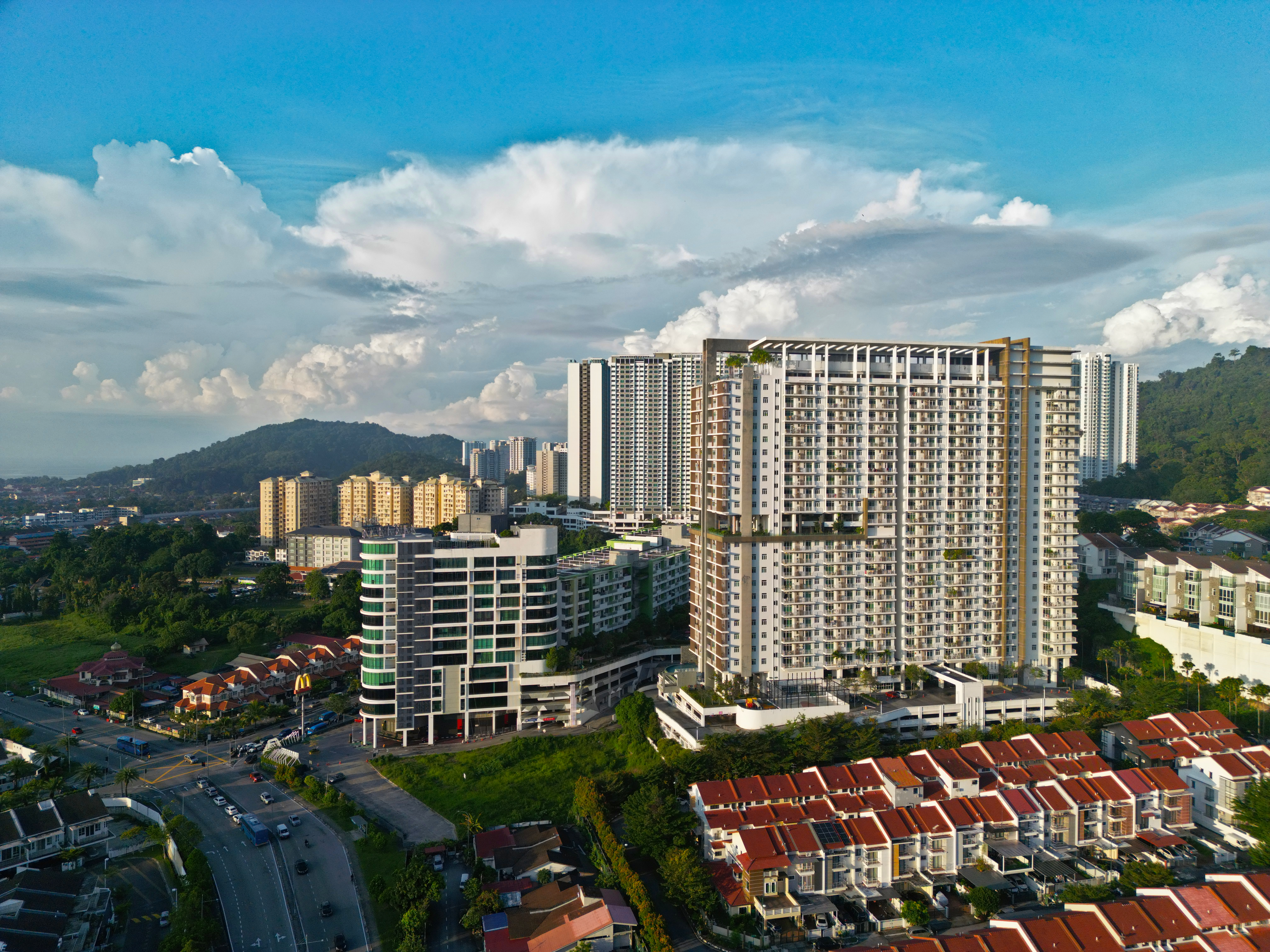
Newer residential properties were built in the decades since the opening of the Free Industrial Zone.

Bayan Lepas was believed to have been named after a wealthy Sumatran family who founded the town in the late 19th century. The folklore goes that upon coming ashore, their parakeet escaped, and was given the name Bayan Lepas, which meant 'escaped parakeet' in Malay. Bayan Lepas could also be named after Raja Bayan or Nakhoda Bayan, a prince from the kingdom of Minangkabau, Sumatra. Raja Bayan settled in Penang in the 1700s when he was appointed the headman of Penang by the Sultan of Kedah.

The 'old town' of Bayan Lepas is located at the intersection of Jalan Bayan Lepas and Jalan Dato Ismail Hashim, to the west of the Penang International Airport.

The British also built a fortification at nearby Batu Maung to defend Penang Island and the RAF Butterworth Air Base on the mainland against amphibious invasion. However, the fort was abandoned after the advancing Imperial Japanese Army during World War II.

Until the 1970s, Bayan Lepas was a relatively rural village, with rice farming being the main economic activity. As a result, the town was nicknamed the "rice bowl" of Penang.

In 1972, the then Chief Minister of Penang, Lim Chong Eu, opened the Bayan Lepas Free Industrial Zone (Bayan Lepas FIZ) to alleviate an economic crisis and rising unemployment in Penang at the time. Industrialisation necessitated the development of newer townships such as Bayan Baru and accelerated commercial developments at the area.

== Geography ==
Map of Bayan Lepas.
Click link at the top right corner to zoom in.
1 Bayan Lepas Market
2 Penang International Airport
3 Bayan Lepas FIZ Phase 1
4 Bayan Lepas FIZ Phase 2
5 Bayan Lepas FIZ Phase 3
6 Bayan Lepas FIZ Phase 4
7 Bayan Baru
8 Batu Maung
9 Sungai Nibong
10 Sungai Ara
11 Permatang Damar Laut
12 Teluk Tempoyak
13 Rimau Island
14 Setia SPICE
15 Queensbay Mall
16 SUNTECH Tower
17 Muze @ PICC
18 Pantai Hospital
19 Snake Temple
20 Penang War Museum

== Demographics ==
Ethnicities within Bayan Lepas in 2020
Ethnicities / Nationality	Percentage
Malays	42.2%
Other Bumiputeras	0.5%
Chinese	40.4%
Indians	7.0%
Others	0.5%
Non-Malaysians	9.4%

As of 2020, Bayan Lepas was home to a population of 130,455. Malays constituted over 42% of the suburb's population, while Chinese made up another 40%. Non-citizens comprised more than 9% of the population, followed by Indians at 7%.

== Economy ==
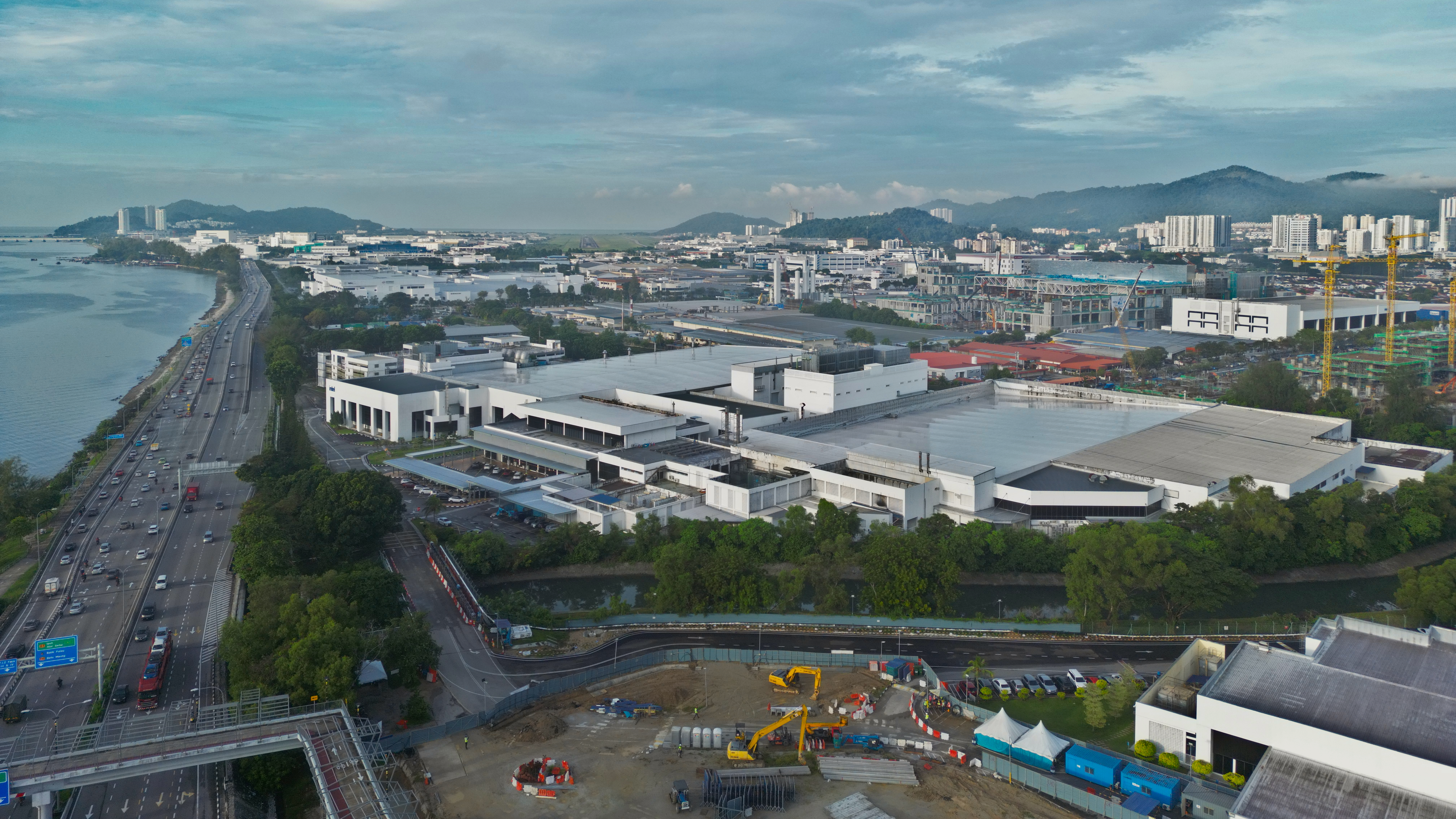
Bayan Lepas Free Industrial Zone, known as the Silicon Valley of the East

=== Manufacturing ===
Known as the Silicon Valley of the East, the Bayan Lepas FIZ is the nucleus of Malaysia's electronics manufacturing industry. Home to hundreds of multinational companies, the FIZ played an instrumental role in Penang's economic diversification, as well as Bayan Lepas's transformation into an industrial centre.

In 2021 alone, the Bayan Lepas FIZ received almost RM71 billion of investments, about 93% of Penang's total investments that year. An estimated RM295,173 million worth of exports also passed through the Penang International Airport throughout 2021, the largest among all entry and exit points in Malaysia. Owing to the high trade volumes at Bayan Lepas, logistics has become a crucial supporting industry, with several logistics providers such as DHL, Schenker AG and Expeditors International opening branches within the area.

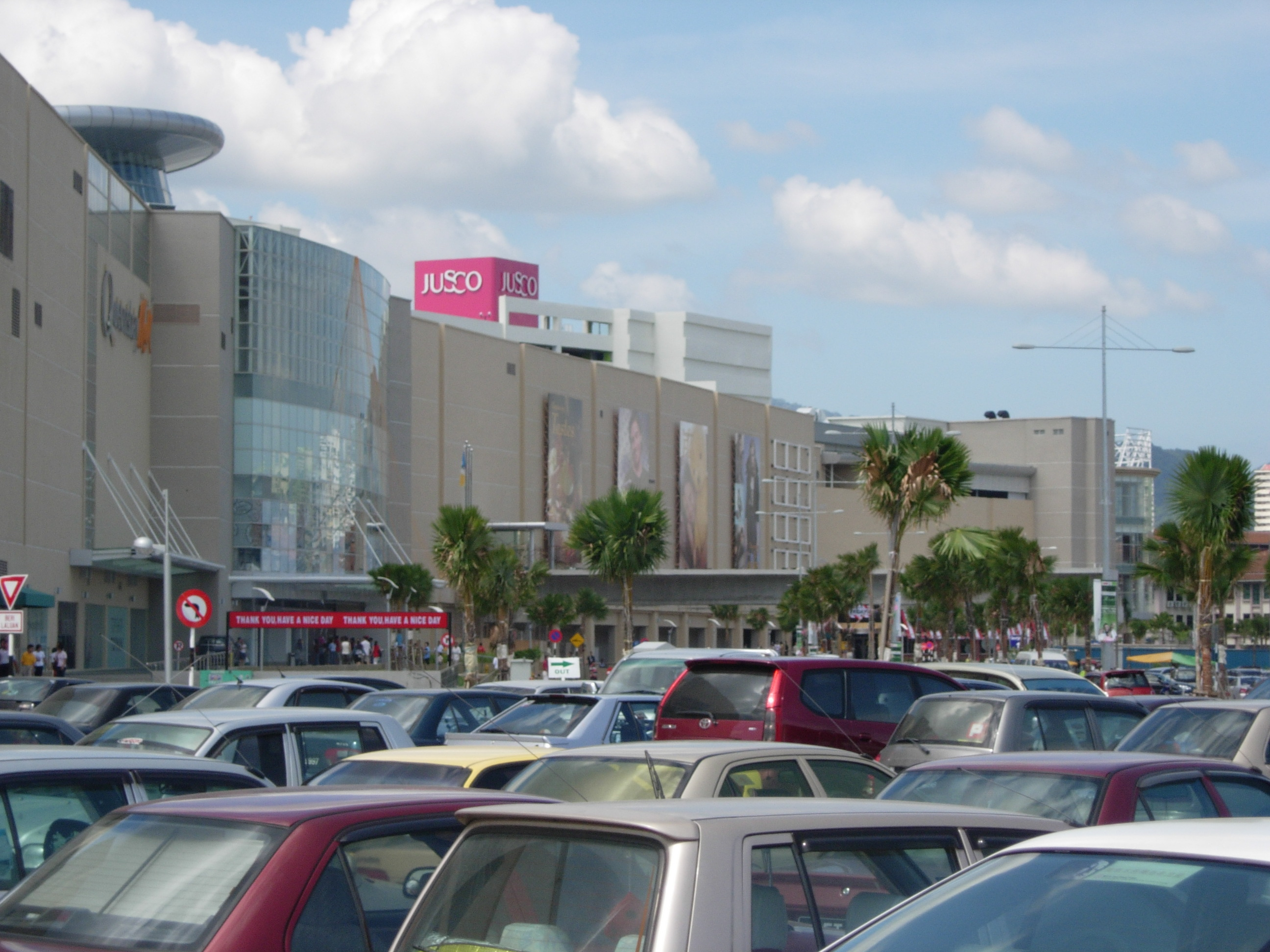
Queensbay Mall, the largest shopping mall in George Town

=== Retail ===
Queensbay Mall, the largest shopping mall by area in George Town, is one of the major retail destinations in the city. With a gross built-up area of 2,500,000 ft^{2} (230,000 m^{2}), the mall contains more than 400 outlets, as well as a cinema and other entertainment options. Additionally, Sunshine Square, a department store of local retail chain Suiwah Corporation, serves the immediate neighbourhood of Bayan Baru.

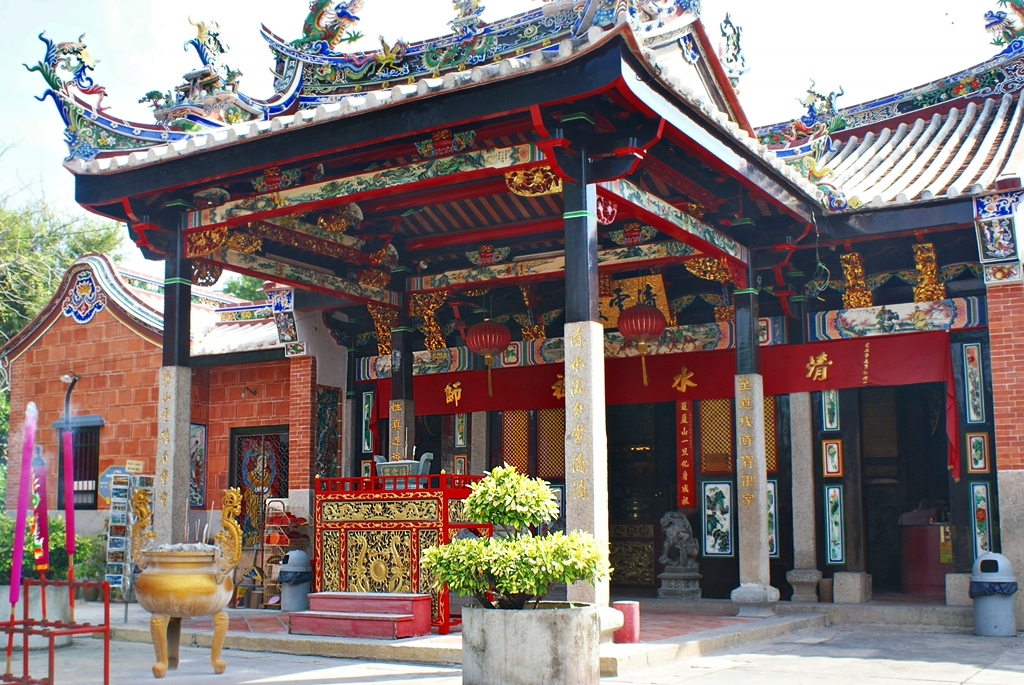
Snake Temple

=== Tourism ===
The Snake Temple is said to be the only Chinese temple in the world to be inhabited by snakes. Built in the 1850s, it has attracted species of pit vipers, which are believed to be rendered harmless by the incense. The temple is also a focal point of the annual Chinese New Year celebrations, during which a flame-watching ceremony is held to predict the fortunes of the following 12 months.

== Transportation ==
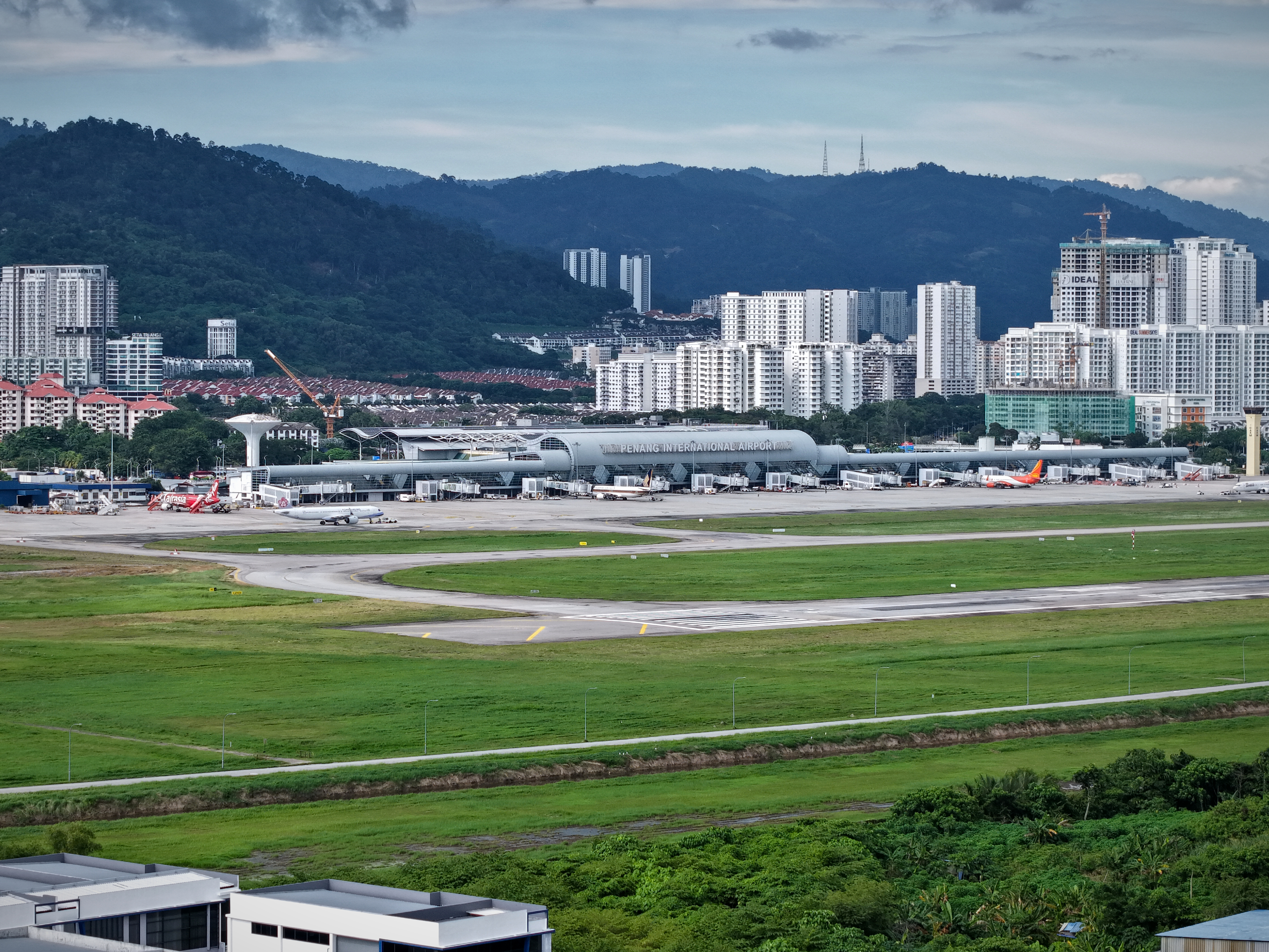
The Penang International Airport is one of the busiest airports in Malaysia, with frequent connections to major Asian cities.

=== Air ===
The Penang International Airport in Bayan Lepas is one of the busiest airports in Malaysia and serves as the major airport within the northern region of Peninsular Malaysia. The airport's proximity to the Bayan Lepas Free Industrial Zone allows for ease of exports, handling an estimated RM295,173 million worth of exports in 2021 alone.

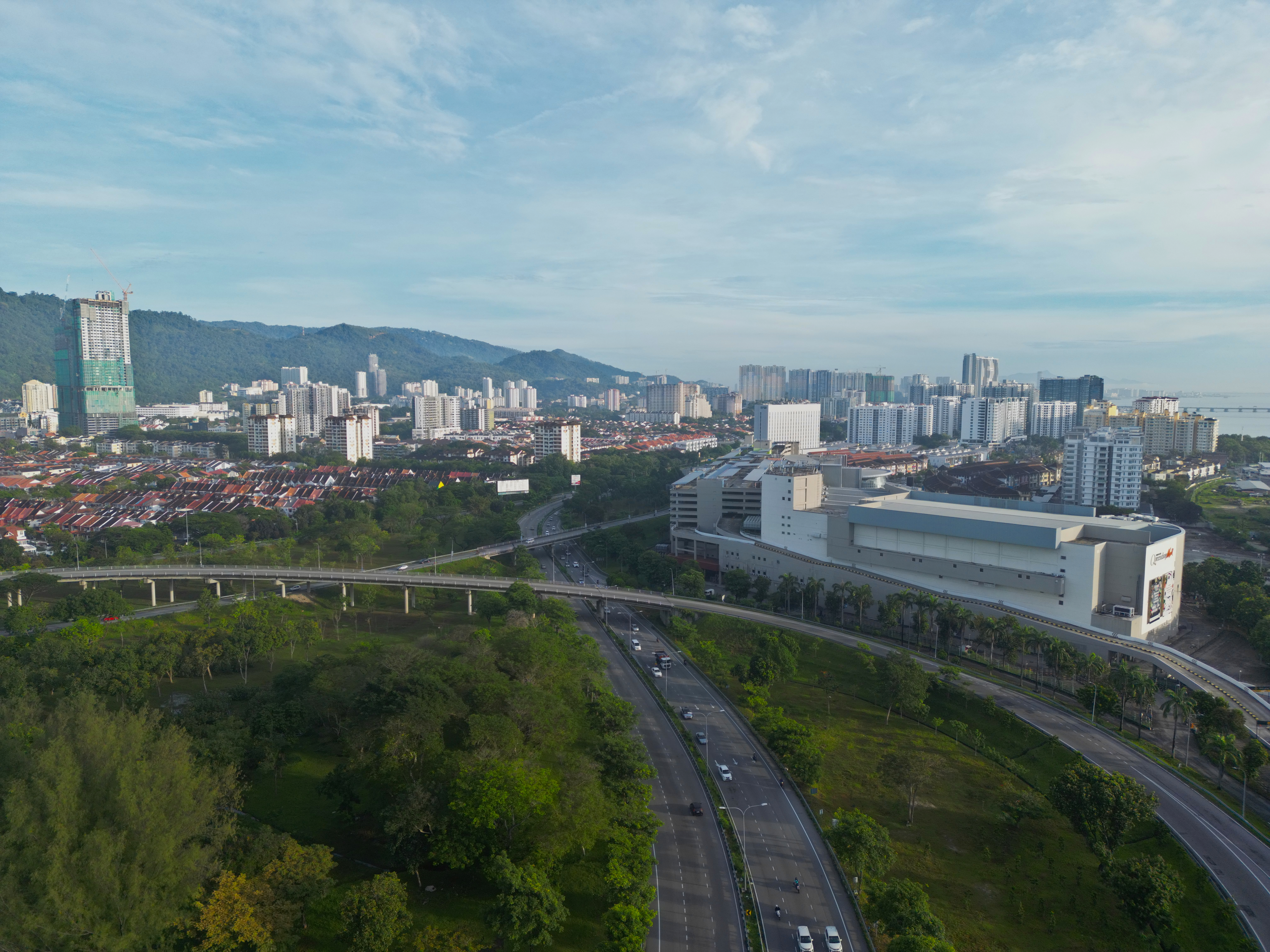
A stretch of the Tun Dr Lim Chong Eu Expressway near Queensbay Mall, facing northwards

=== Land ===
Bayan Lepas is connected to the city centre via the Tun Dr Lim Chong Eu Expressway, and to Balik Pulau via Federal Route 6. Jalan Bayan Lepas, the main thoroughfare within the suburb, also forms part of the latter road.

Rapid Penang bus routes 302, 308, 401 and 401E include stops within Bayan Lepas proper, while the Penang International Airport is served by routes 102, 306, 401, 401E and AT. These routes link Bayan Lepas to various destinations on Penang Island, including the city centre, Balik Pulau and Teluk Kumbar. Aside from these routes, Rapid Penang operates an additional three cross-strait shuttle bus routes - BEST A, BEST B and BEST C - between the Bayan Lepas Free Industrial Zone and Seberang Perai on the mainland; the three routes mainly cater to industrial workers who reside on the mainland.

In 2017, LinkBike, a local public bicycle sharing service, launched its southernmost station at Queensbay Mall. This, along with the Summerton station nearby, provides bikers with an alternative mode of transportation between Bayan Lepas and the city centre.

== Education ==
There are 13 primary schools, four high schools and an international school within Bayan Lepas.

Primary schools

- SK Batu Maung
- SK Bayan Baru
- SK Bayan Lepas
- SJK (T) Bayan Lepas
- SJK (C) Chong Cheng
- SJK (C) Chung Shan
- SK Mutiara Perdana
- SK Permatang Damar Laut
- SK Seri Permai
- SK Sungai Ara
- SJK (T) Sungai Ara
- SK Sungai Nibong
- SJK (C) Wen Khai

High schools

- SMK Batu Maung
- SMK Raja Tun Uda
- SMK Sungai Ara
- Heng Ee High School (Bayan Baru Branch)

International school

- Straits International School

In addition, the Penang Skills Development Centre (PSDC), a nonprofit institute specialising in tertiary-level skills training, is situated within the Bayan Lepas Free Industrial Zone.
