= Suntec =

Suntec may refer to:

- Suntec City, a multi-use development in Singapore
  - Suntec Singapore Convention and Exhibition Centre
- SUNTECH Tower, a business tower in Penang, Malaysia
- Suntech Power, a Chinese producer of solar panels
