= Muze @ PICC =

Condominium in George Town, Penang, Malaysia

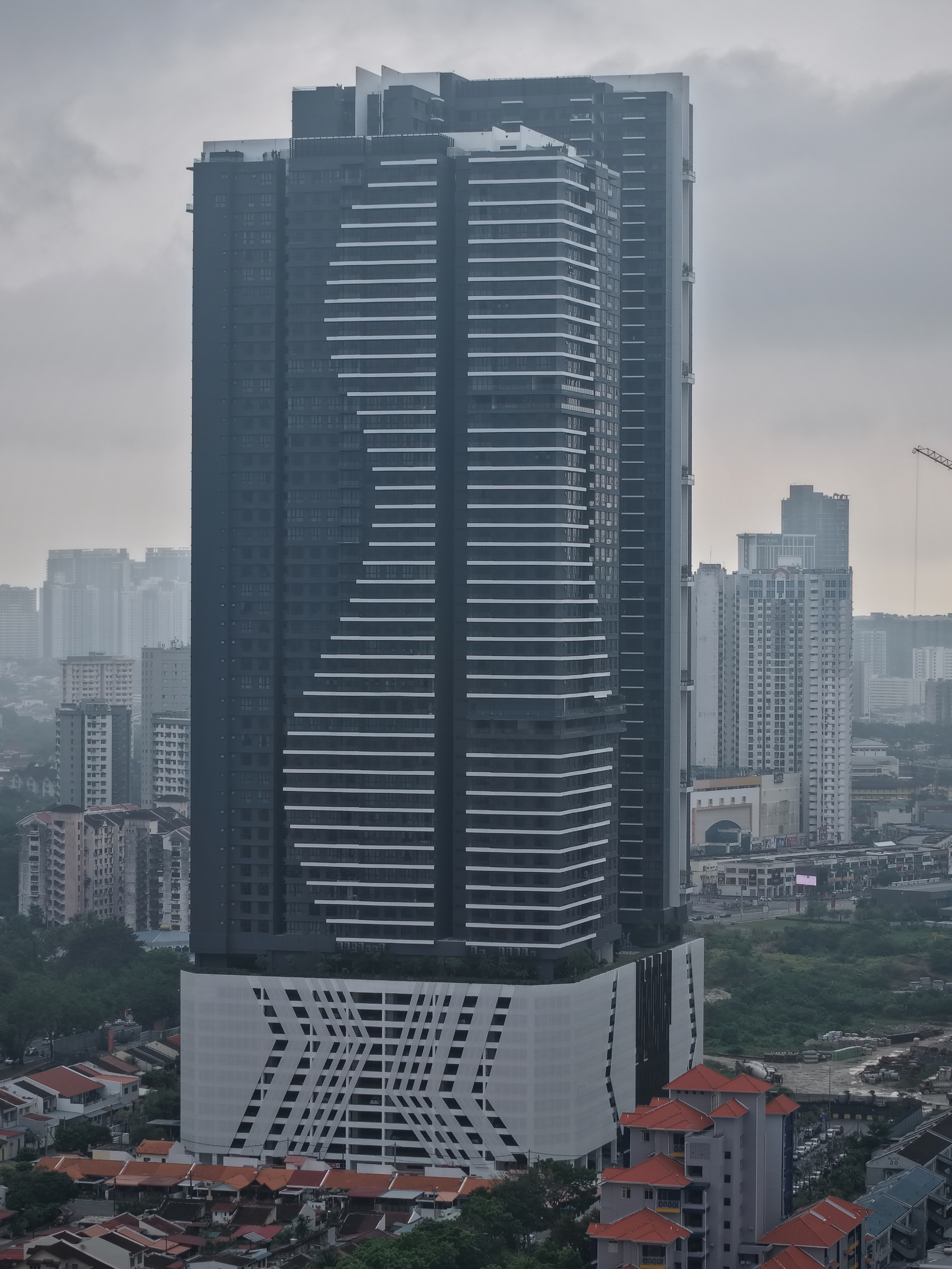

General information
- Type: Condominium
- Location: Persiaran Mahsuri, 11950 Bayan Lepas, George Town, Penang, Malaysia, George Town, Penang, Malaysia
- Coordinates: 5.331203°N 100.285291°E
- Completed: 2023
- Owner: Hunza Properties Group

Height
- Roof: A: 181.5 m (595 ft); B: 205.5 m (674 ft)

Technical details
- Floor count: A: 52; B: 58
- Floor area: 1.3 ha (3.2 acres)

Design and construction
- Architect: Arkitek Permata
- Developer: Hunza Properties Group

Muze @ PICC is a residential complex within George Town in the Malaysian state of Penang. Located at the township of Bayan Baru, it consists of a pair of skyscrapers, Block A and Block B, with 52 and 58 stories respectively. Block B, in particular, stands at a height of 205.5 m (674 ft), making it the third tallest skyscraper within the city of George Town as of 2023.

Built by local developer Hunza Group, both towers contain a total of 846 residential units. Muze forms a residential component of the Penang International Commercial City (PICC) and is the first to be completed; the wider 43-acre (170,000 m^{2}) PICC, dubbed as Penang's answer to the KLCC, entails an integrated mixed-use precinct comprising residential, retail, commercial, hospitality and medical components.

== See also ==
- List of tallest buildings in George Town
- Bayan Baru
