= Sungai Nibong =

Neighbourhood of George Town in Penang, Malaysia

- Neighbourhood of George Town
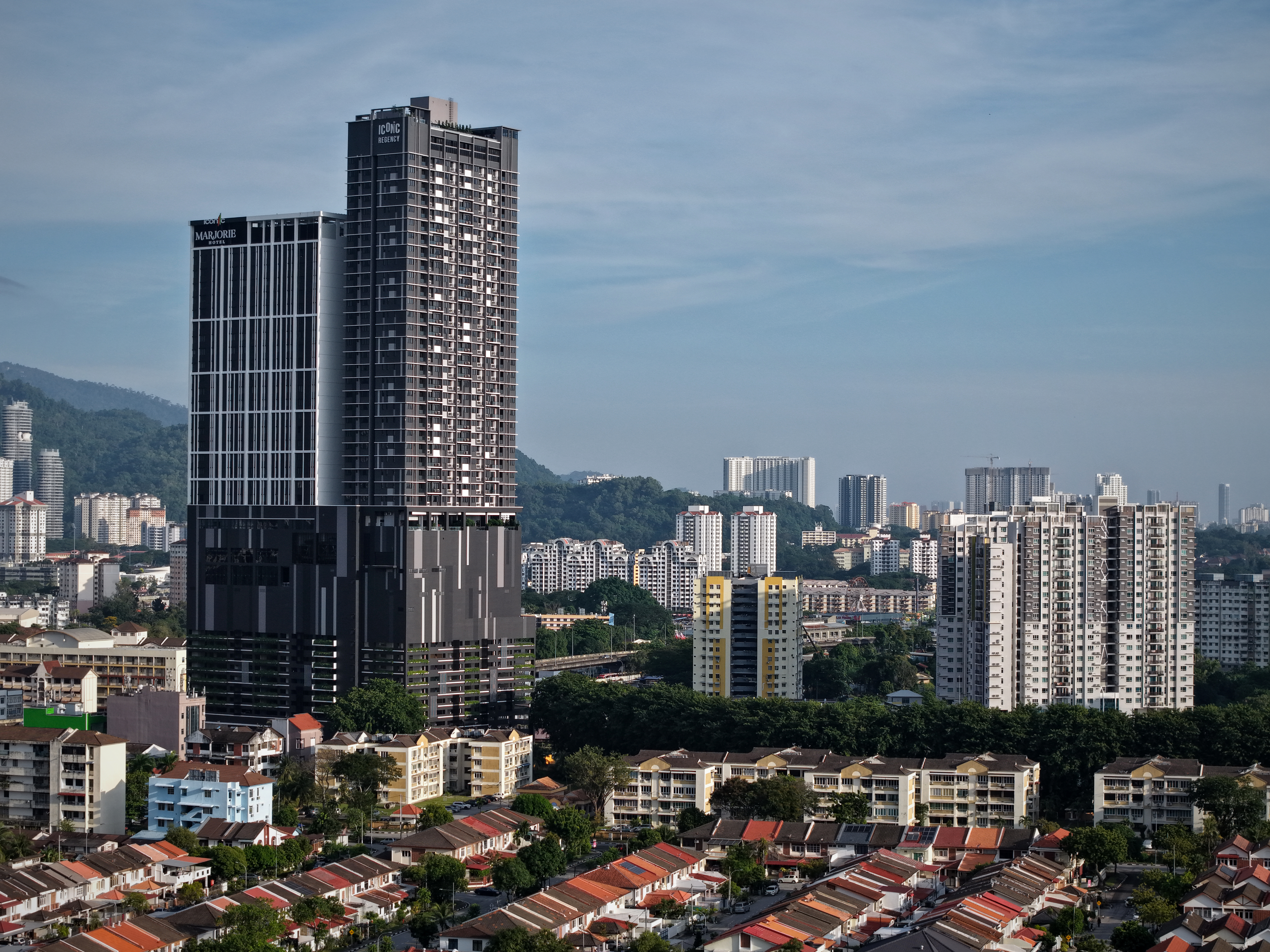

- Location within George Town in Penang
- Coordinates: 5°20′32.9418″N 100°18′1.0044″E
- Country: Malaysia
- State: Penang
- City: George Town
- District: Northeast
- Time zone: UTC+8 (MST)
  - Summer (DST): Not observed
- Postal code: 11900

Sungai Nibong is a residential neighbourhood within the city of George Town in the Malaysian state of Penang. It lies near the eastern coast of Penang Island, about 8.6 km (5.3 mi) south of the city centre.

Sungai Nibong is best known as the site of the annual Penang Island Festival, more popularly called 'Pesta Pulau Pinang' in Malay. The area is also home to the main intercity bus terminal for George Town, which is used by travelers commuting into and out of the island city from various parts of Peninsular Malaysia, Singapore and Thailand.

== Etymology ==
Sungai Nibong was named after two rivers that pass through the area – Sungai Nibong Kecil and Sungai Nibong Besar.

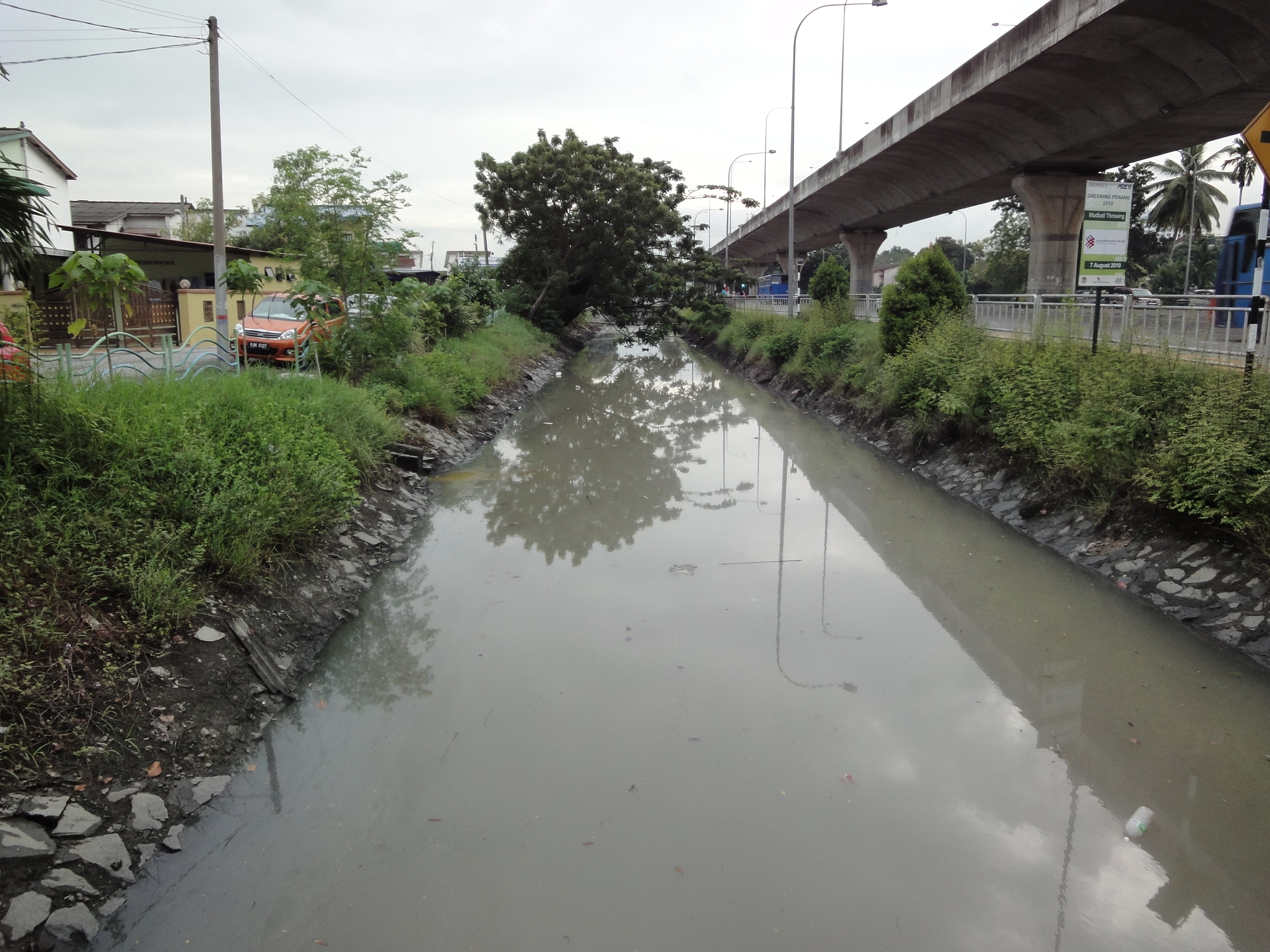
Sungai Nibong Kecil, a minor river which has been canalised

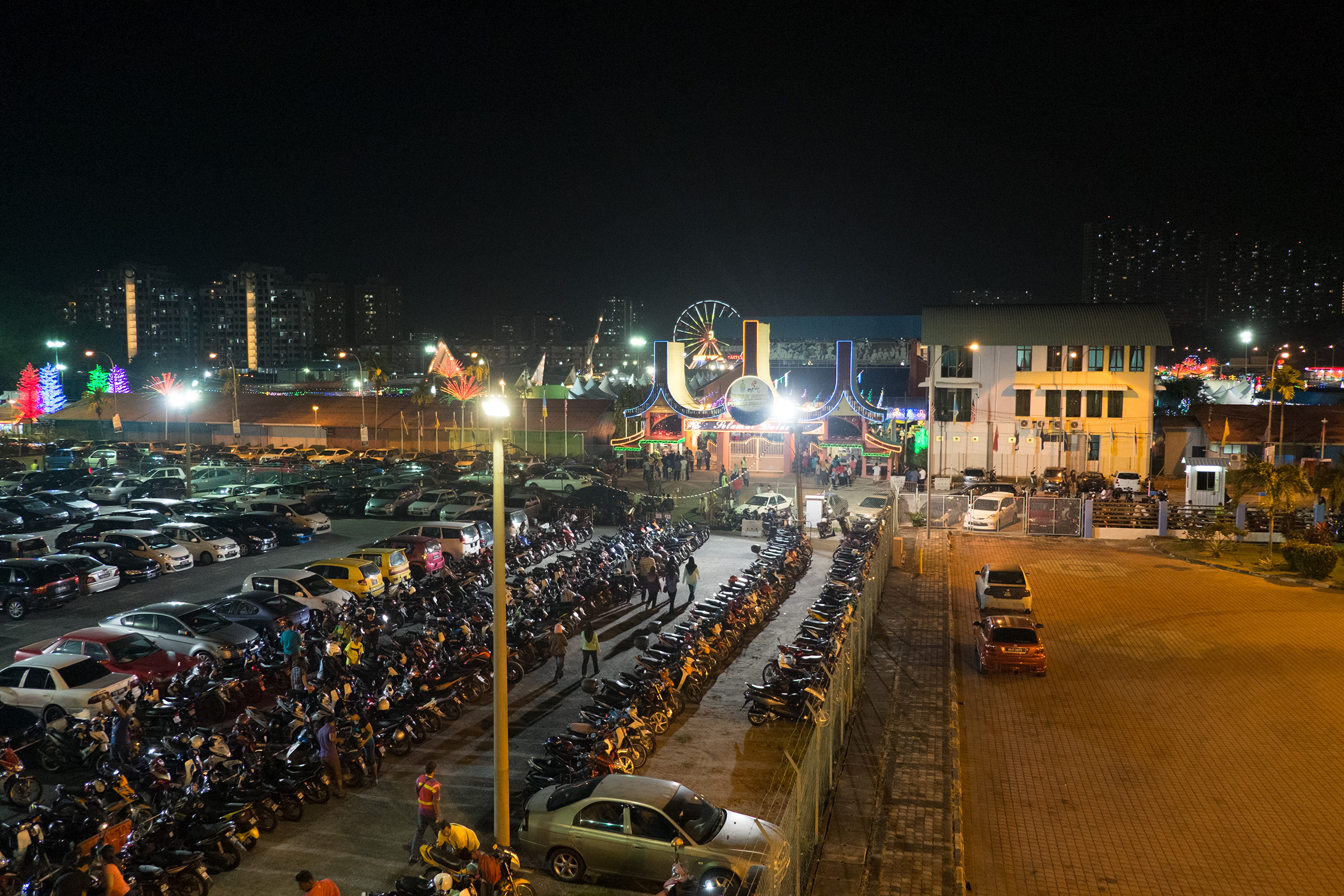
The Penang Island Festival site

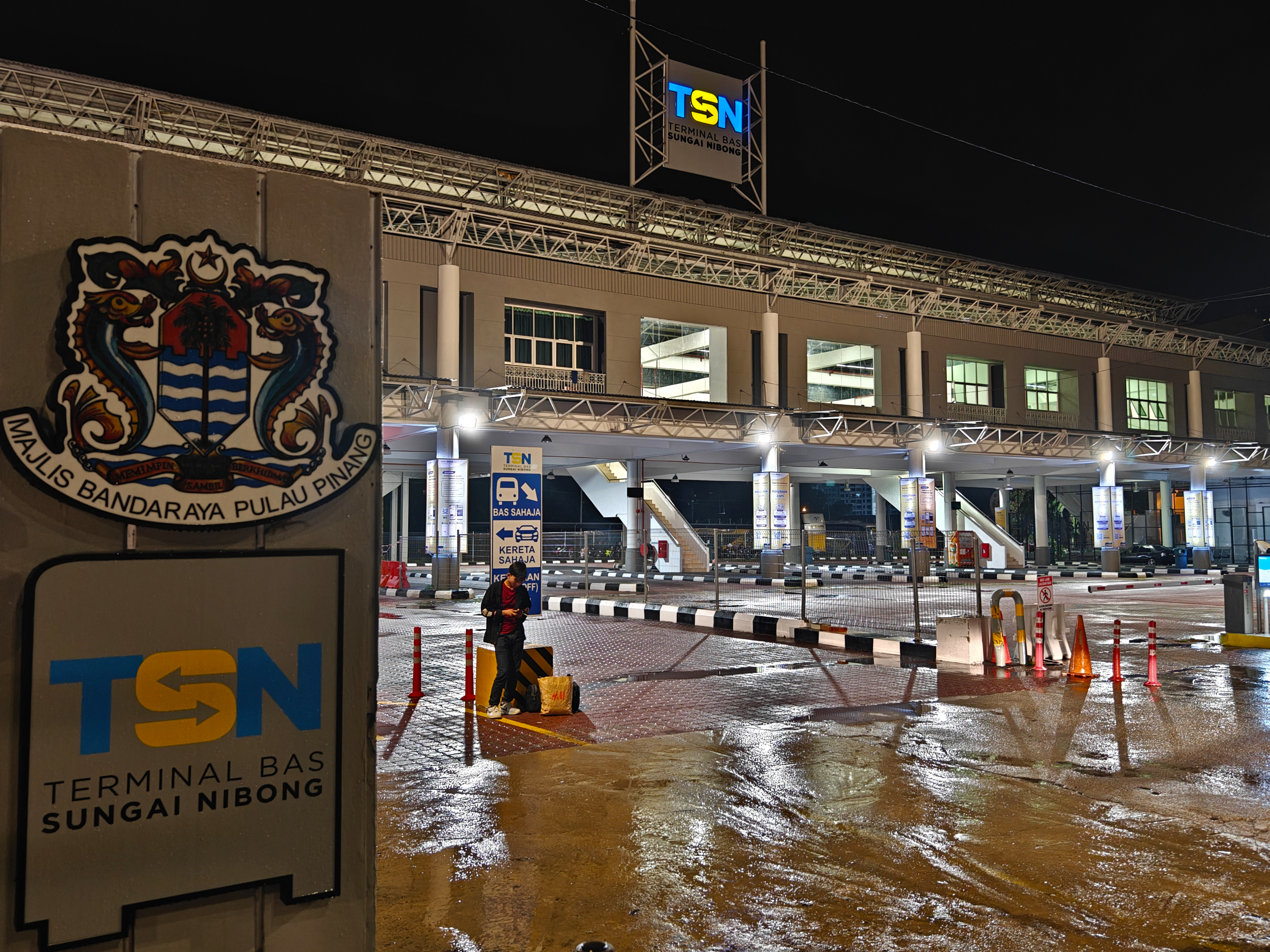
Sungai Nibong Bus Terminal

== Transportation ==
Rapid Penang bus routes 102, 303, 304, 305, 308, 401 and AT (Airport Transit) include stops along Jalan Sultan Azlan Shah, which runs through the heart of the neighbourhood. These routes link Sungai Nibong with George Town to the north and other southerly destinations on Penang Island, including the Penang International Airport, Bayan Baru and Bayan Lepas. Sungai Nibong is also served by Rapid Penang's Congestion Alleviation Transport (CAT) Sungai Dua route, a free-of-charge transit service which connects the neighbourhood with Sungai Dua, Queensbay Mall and Bukit Jambul.

In addition, the Sungai Nibong Bus Terminal, opened in 2005, serves as the main intercity bus terminal for George Town. Bus passengers from various parts of Peninsular Malaysia, Singapore and southern Thailand wishing to travel to Penang Island typically arrive at the bus terminal, while those travelling out of the island could board the various interstate buses at the terminal. The facility is currently managed by the Penang Island City Council and was last upgraded in 2024.

== Education ==
The neighbourhood is served by three primary schools and a high school.

Primary schools

- SRJK (C) Kwang Hwa
- SRJK (C) Shih Chung Cawangan
- SRK Sungai Nibong

High school

- SMK Sungai Nibong

== Leisure ==
Sungai Nibong is well known for its festival site, which hosts the yearly Penang Island Festival (Malay: Pesta Pulau Pinang). An open public space, the site is transformed every December into a mishmash of amusement parks, local cultural performances and bargain stalls. The festival, which had its origins in George Town, has been regularly held at Sungai Nibong since 1974.
