= Pantai Hospital Penang =

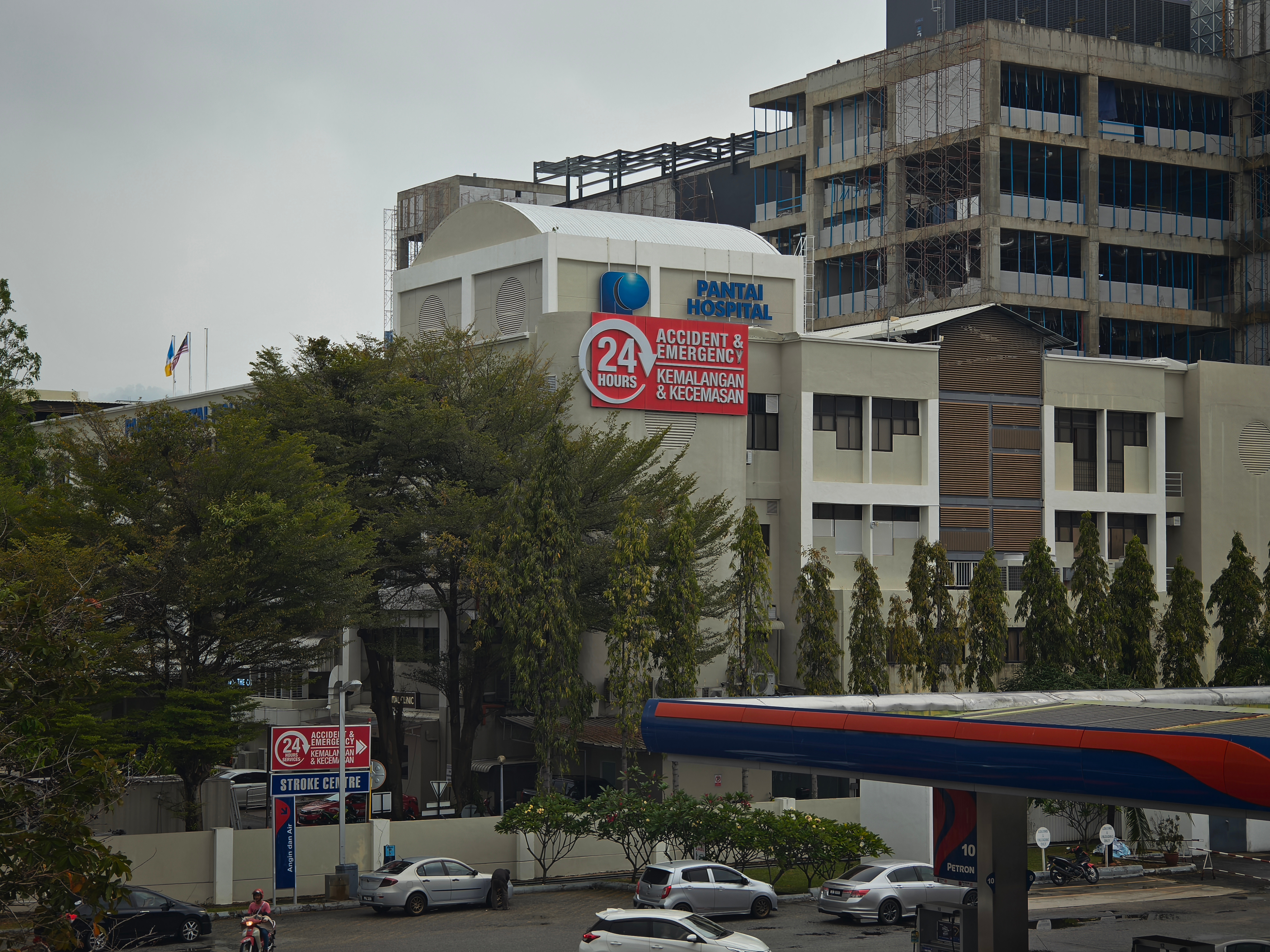

Geography
- Location: 82, Jalan Tengah, Bayan Baru, 11900 Bayan Lepas, George Town, Penang, Malaysia
- Coordinates: 5.321098°N 100.28202°E

Organisation
- Type: Specialised
- Network: Parkway Pantai, IHH Healthcare

Services
- Beds: 209

History
- Founded: 1997; 29 years ago

Links
- Website: www.pantai.com.my/penang

Pantai Hospital Penang is a private hospital in George Town within the Malaysian state of Penang. Established in 1997, the 190-bed specialist hospital at Bayan Baru offers services in Radiotherapy & Oncology, Cardiology, Dentistry, Neurology, Neurosurgery and Cardiothoracic Surgery. It also houses the only Stroke Center in the Northern Region.

The hospital has 49 full-time specialist doctors, 15 sessional and 6 visiting specialist doctors. New facilities and services such as the recent additions - Urology, Extracorporeal Shock Wave Lithotripsy, Stroke Centre, Interventional Radiology, Radiotherapy and Brachytherapy (Intensity Modulated Radiation Therapy) – are part of the hospital.

== Medical Centres ==
- Birth Education Classes
- Cardiology
- Dental Clinic
- Health Screening
- Inpatient Care
- Physical & Rehabilitation Medicine

Collectively, the Pantai group of hospitals treat over 158,000 patients annually from a pool of more than 890 doctors and 2,800 nurses. They provide a range of medical services ranging from health and wellness check ups to cardiac surgery.
