= Snake Temple =

Chinese temple in George Town, Penang, Malaysia

- Malay: Tokong Ular; Chinese: 蛇庙
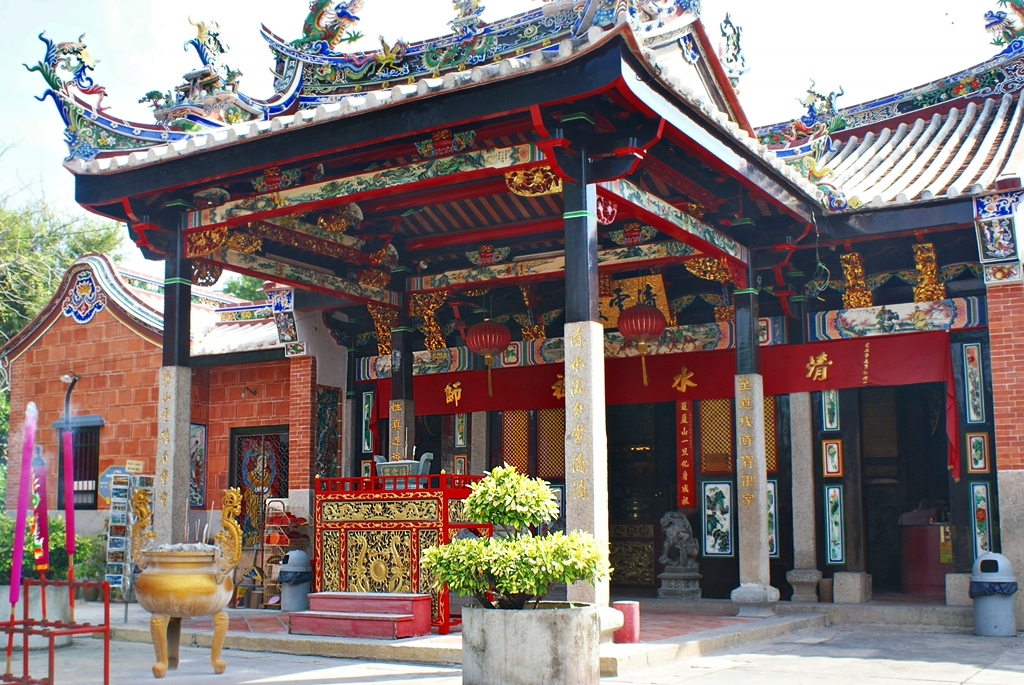

- Location within George Town

Religion
- Affiliation: Buddhism, Taoism, Chinese folk beliefs
- Deity: Master Qingshui
- Status: Active

Location
- Location: Jalan Tokong Ular, Bayan Lepas
- Municipality: George Town
- State: Penang
- Country: Malaysia
- Coordinates: 5°18′50.20″N 100°17′06.71″E

Architecture
- Type: Chinese temple
- Completed: 1805

Snake Temple
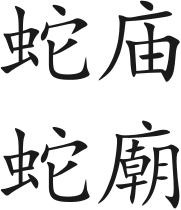
- Snake Temple in Simplified Chinese (top) and Traditional Chinese character (bottom)
- Traditional Chinese: 蛇廟
- Simplified Chinese: 蛇庙
Transcriptions
Standard Mandarin
- Hanyu Pinyin: Shé Miào
Southern Min
- Hokkien POJ: Tsuâ-biō

The Snake Temple (Chinese: 蛇庙; pinyin: Shé Miào; Pe̍h-ōe-jī: Tsuâ-biō), also known as the Temple of the Azure Clouds, is a Chinese temple within George Town in the Malaysian state of Penang. Located at Bayan Lepas, the temple is well-known for being a refuge of resident snakes, said to be reincarnated disciples of the deified Buddhist monk Master Qingshui, to whom the temple is dedicated.

Devotees from as far away as Singapore, Taiwan and China come to pray in the temple on the monk's birthday (the sixth day of the first lunar month). It was also featured during the 8th leg of The Amazing Race 16 and become a backdrop of Tan Twan Eng's novel The Gift of Rain (book 1, chapter 4).

== History ==
The temple was constructed in the 1805 to honour Chor Soo Kong (also known as Master Qingshui), a Buddhist monk who lived during the Song dynasty (960–1279) for his numerous miracles and good deeds especially in healing the sick and giving shelter to snakes. When the temple structure was completed in the 1800s, snakes coming from the species of Wagler's pit viper reportedly appeared by themselves.

== Features ==
The temple is filled with the smoke of burning incense and a variety of pit vipers. The vipers are believed to be rendered harmless by the sacred smoke, but as a safety precaution, the snakes have been de-venomed while still retaining their fangs. Other species of snakes are also found in the temple. Visitors are warned against picking up the reptiles and placing them on their bodies to take pictures. Aside from the snakes, two brick wells known as the "Dragon Eye Wells/Dragon Pure Water Wells" are located inside the temple together with two giant brass bells. In 2005, a snake breeding centre was set up in the temple.

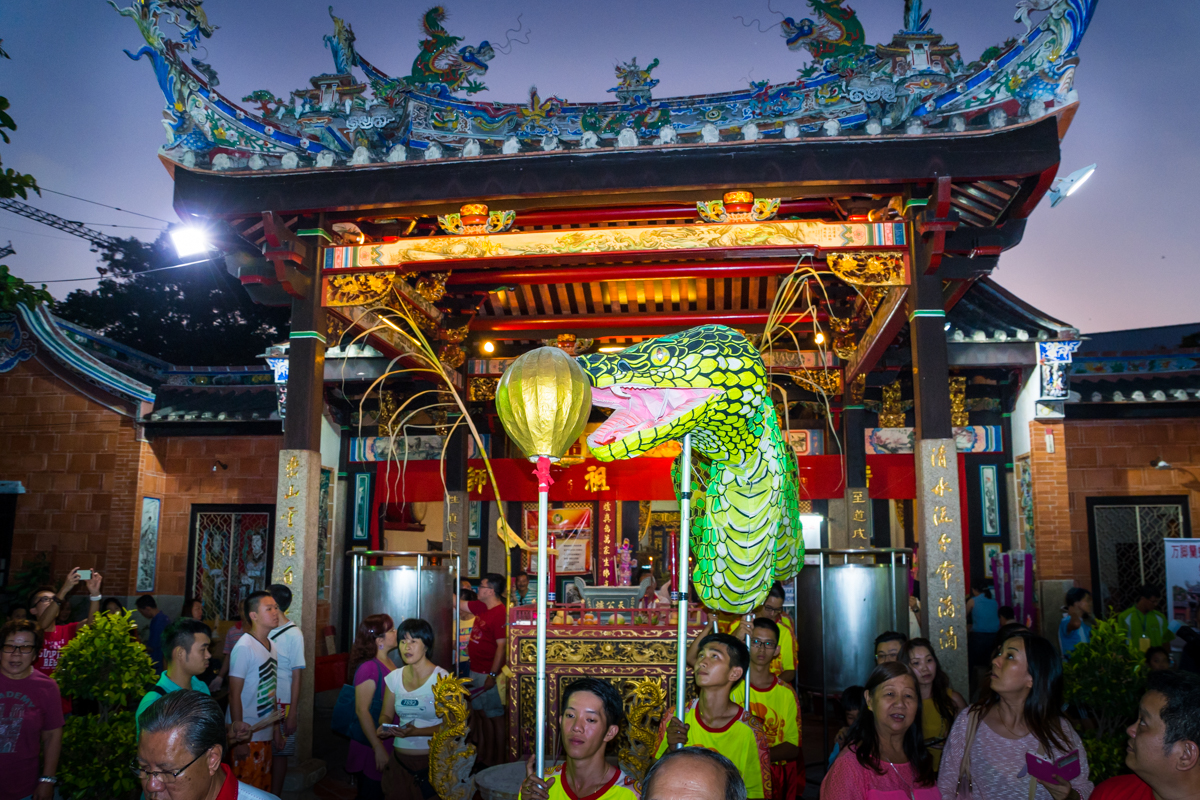
Snake dance in the temple compound during night.

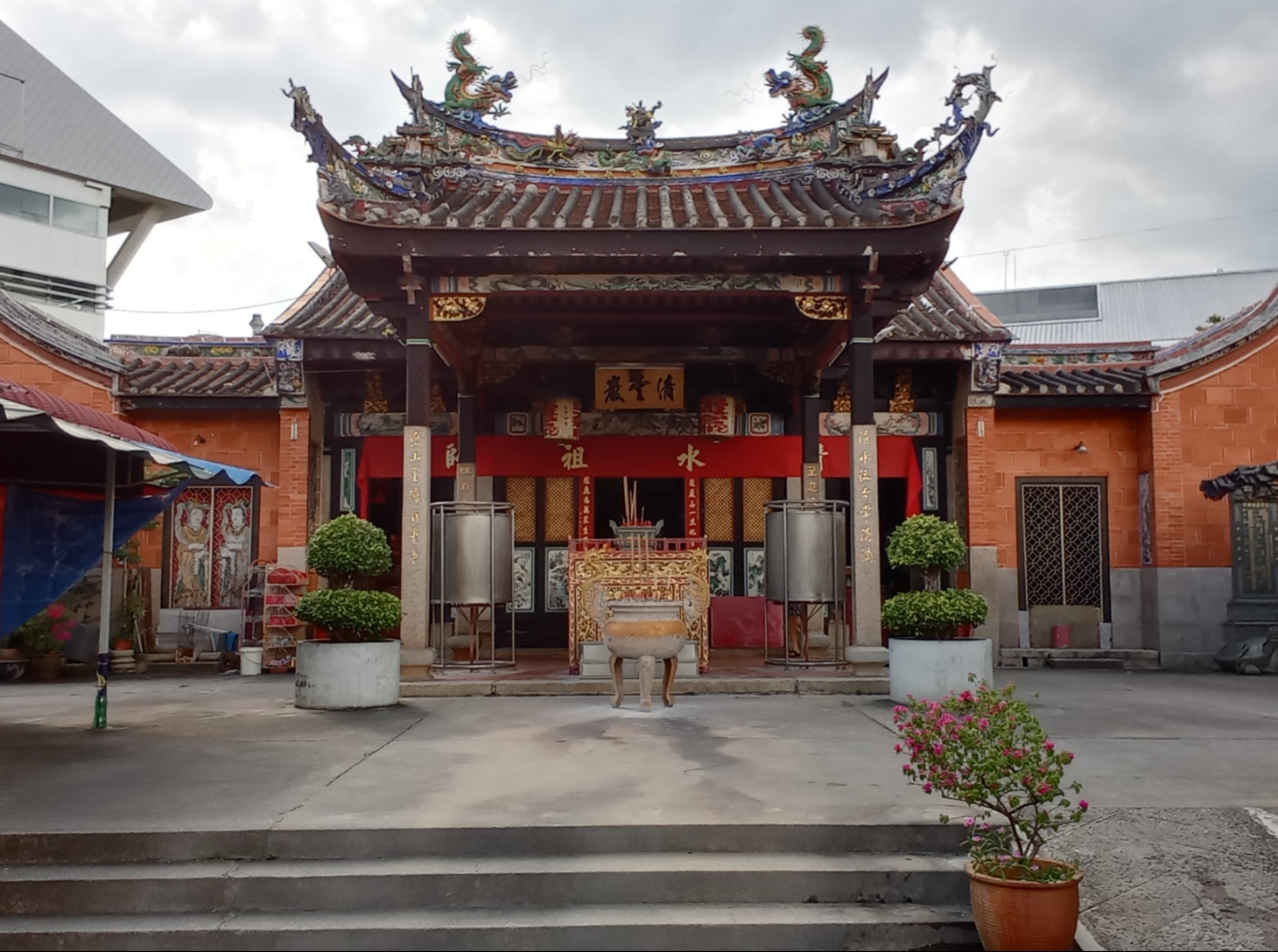
The temple exterior.

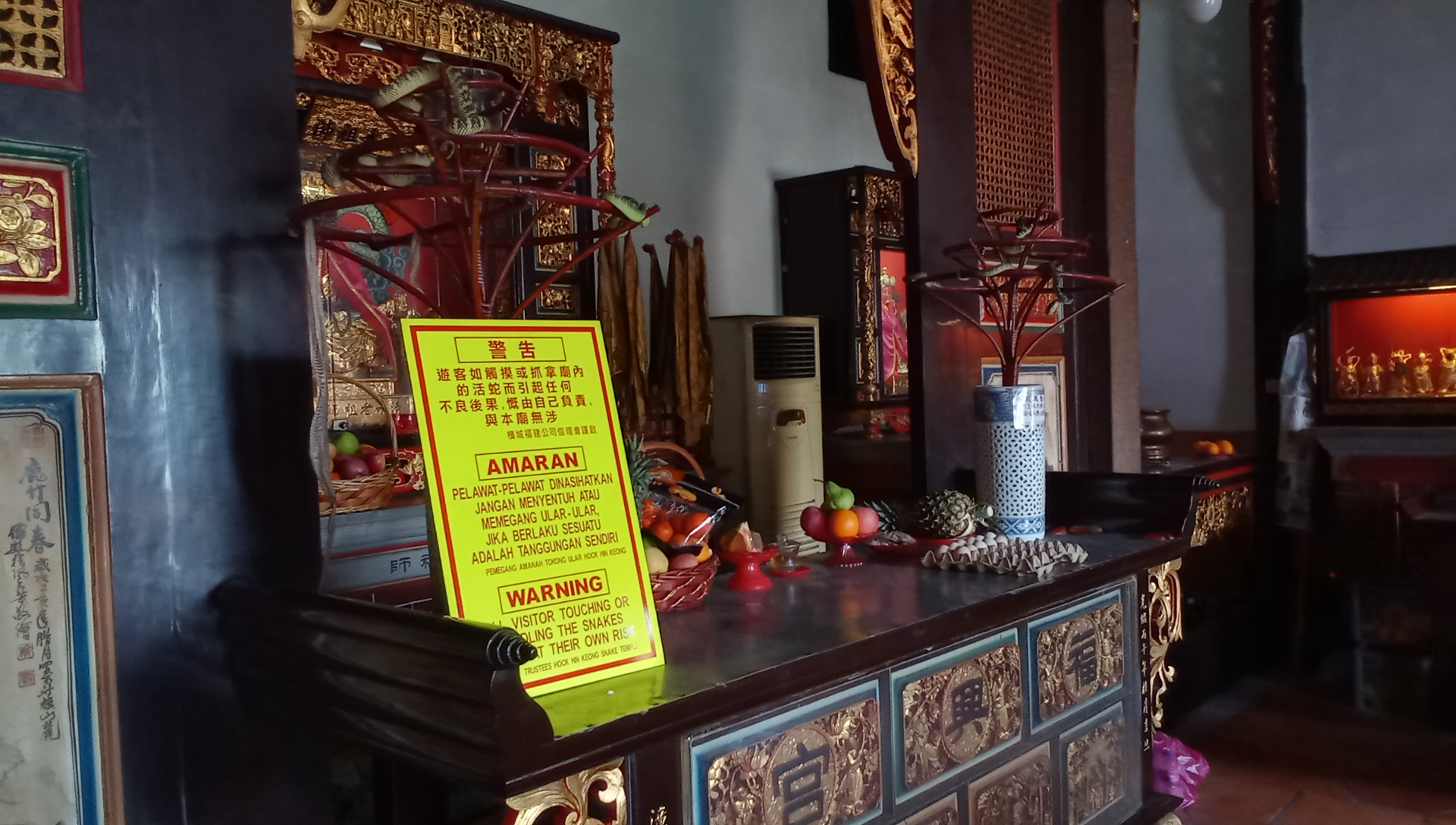
Viper snakes inside the temple.
