= SJK(C) Kwang Hwa =

- 槟城双溪里蒙光华小学

Location
- SJKC Kwang Hwa, Sekolah Jenis Kebangsaan (Cina) Kwang Hwa, 39, Jalan Sultan Azlan Shah, Sungai Nibong, 11900 Bayan Lepas, Penang; Sungai Nibong, Penang, 11900; Malaysia

Information
- School type: Public School Chinese school
- Motto: 敬爱诚朴 (respect, love, honest, simple)
- Founded: 1935
- Principal: Ms Leong Sook Luan
- Gender: Unisex
- Age range: 7 to 12
- Average class size: 30–40 students
- Language: Mandarin Chinese, English, and Malay
- Classrooms: 52
- Campus size: Middle
- School fees: Mostly free
- Affiliation: Ministry of Education
- Website: https://www.kwanghwa.edu.my/

SJK(C) Kwang Hwa (Chinese: 双溪里蒙光华小学; Malay: Sekolah Jenis Kebangsaan (Cina) Kwang Hwa), SJK(C) Kwang Hwa is located at Sungai Nibong next to another school, SJK(C) Shih Chung Cawangan. The school was awarded as a High Performance School (HPS), otherwise known as Sekolah Berprestasi Tinggi.
