= Bayan Baru =

- Neighbourhood
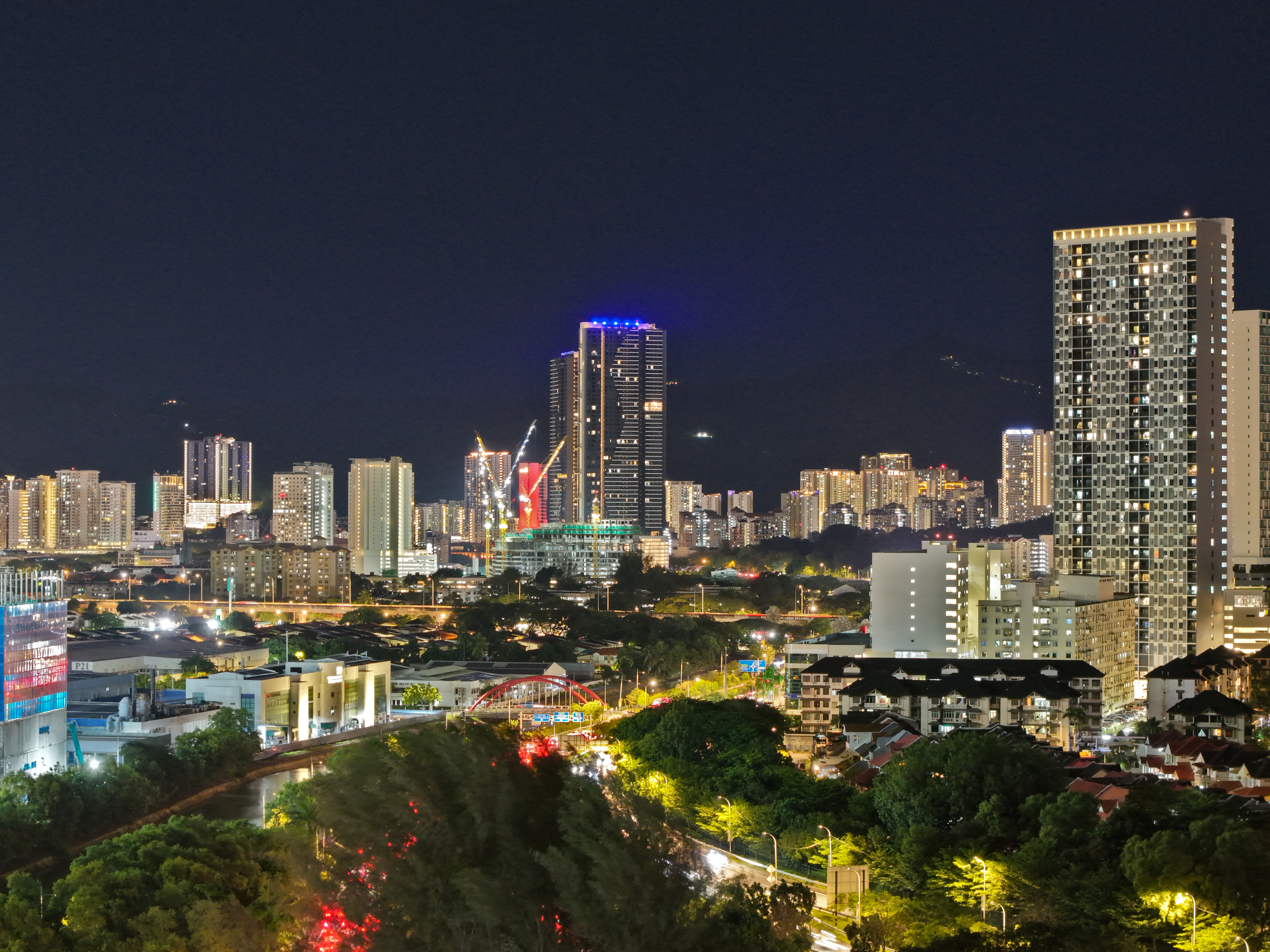
- Interactive map of Bayan Baru
- Location within George Town in Penang
- Coordinates: 5°19′32.757″N 100°17′8.0592″E
- Country: Malaysia
- State: Penang
- City: George Town
- District: Southwest
- Founded: 1972
- Time zone: UTC+8 (MST)
  - Summer (DST): Not observed
- Postal code: 11950

Bayan Baru is a neighbourhood of George Town in the Malaysian state of Penang. Located 11 km (6.8 mi) south of the city centre, it lies within the suburb of Bayan Lepas, and adjacent to the Bayan Lepas Free Industrial Zone, Relau, Sungai Ara and Bukit Jambul.

The township was created in the 1970s following the establishment of the zone. Since then, Bayan Baru has evolved into a booming neighbourhood, with various commercial and retail developments.

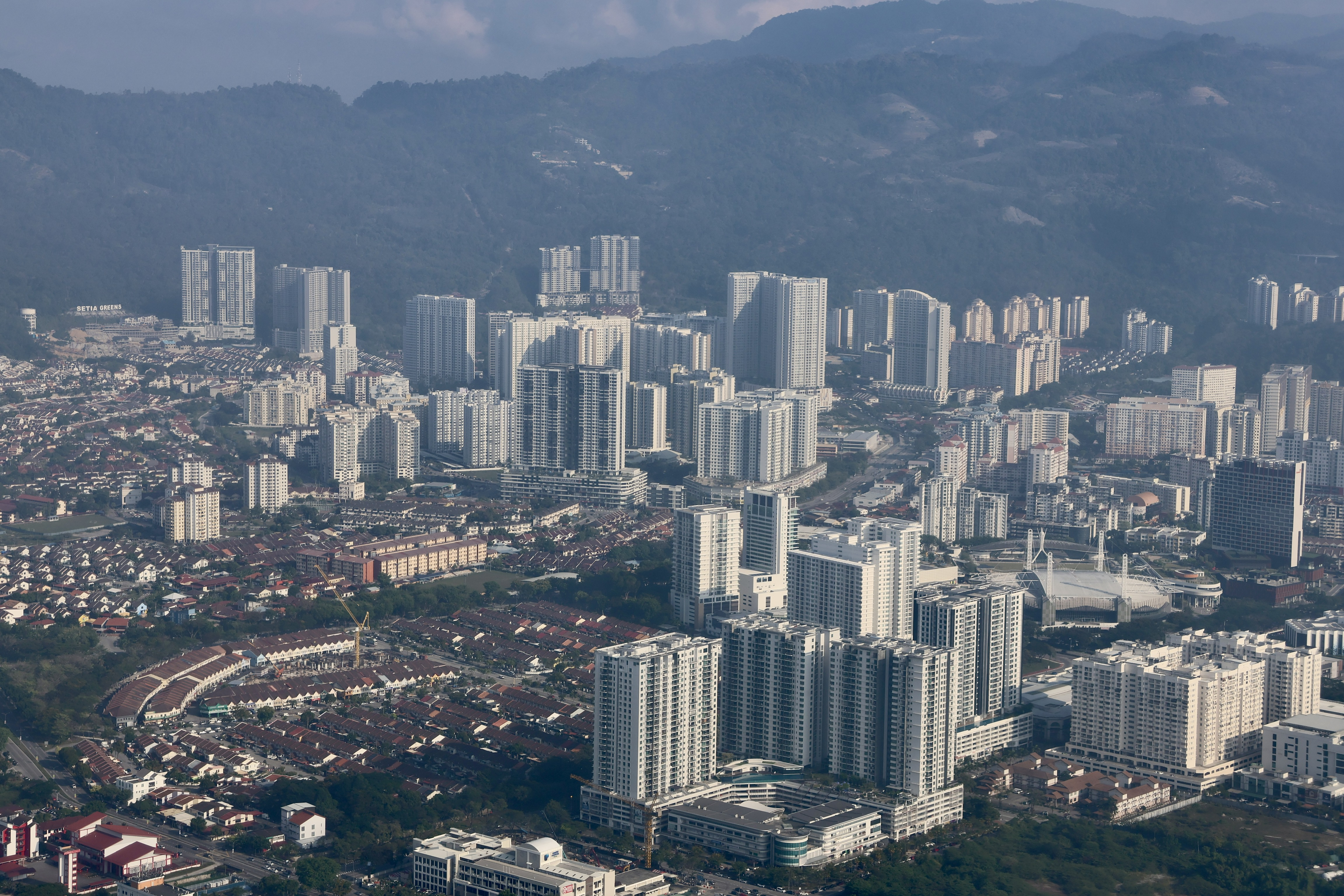
Aerial view of Bayan Baru, with the high-rises of Relau forming the background

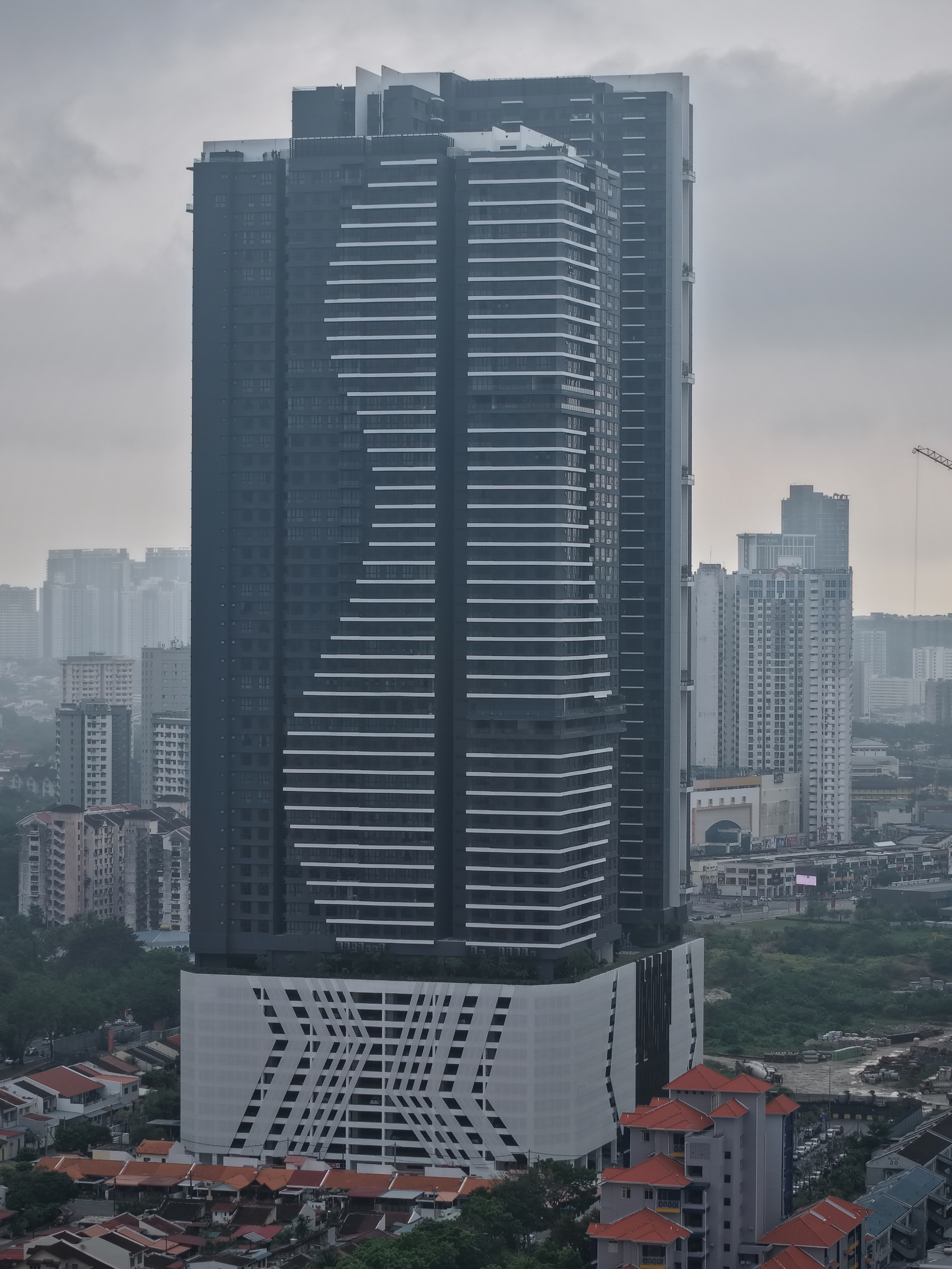
Muze Block B is the third tallest skyscraper in the city of George Town

== History ==
Bayan Baru was first developed by the Penang Development Corporation (PDC) in 1972, in tandem with the construction of the Bayan Lepas Free Industrial Zone. The creation of the new township was aimed at providing a housing area adjacent to the newly built industries in Bayan Lepas, and erasing social and economic inequalities between the urban and rural inhabitants. The first residential developments in the area were in the form of landed properties, such as terraced houses and semi-detached houses.

== Economy ==
In recent years, the Penang state government has allocated investments towards the development of Bayan Baru into a Business Processing Outsourcing (BPO) hub. These investments include the construction of Multimedia Super Corridor (MSC)-status infrastructure, such as SUNTECH Tower and One Precinct. A number of multinational firms, including Celestica, Keyence, Swarovski, Jabil, Teleperformance, Kuehne + Nagel and Zurich Insurance, have already set up business outsourcing centres within the area as well.

The supply of office space in Bayan Baru will also be supplemented by ongoing commercial developments within the neighbourhood, such as Quartermile and the Penang International Commercial City (PICC). The latter, developed by local property developer Hunza, is envisaged as Penang's answer to KLCC, with construction currently in progress within a 17.2-hectare (0.172 km^{2}) site. PICC's residential component Muze also contains the third tallest skyscraper in George Town.

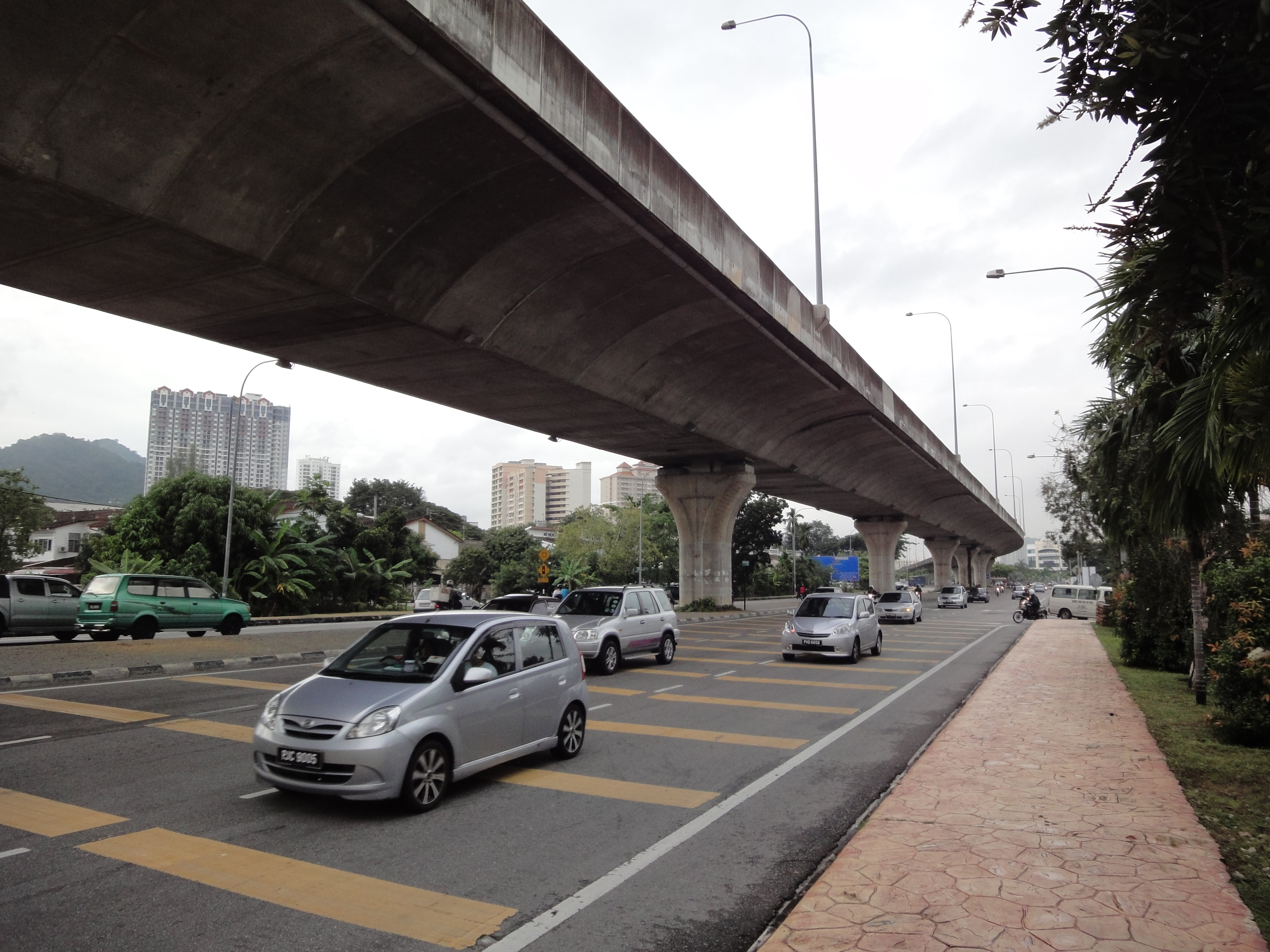
Jalan Sultan Azlan Shah is the main road running through Bayan Baru.

== Transportation ==
The main road within Bayan Baru is Jalan Sultan Azlan Shah, which forms part of the Gelugor Highway. The thoroughfare cuts through the neighbourhood, linking Gelugor to the north with Bayan Lepas to the south.

Several Rapid Penang bus routes serve the area, including 102, 302, 303, 304, 305, 306, 307, 308, 401, 401E and AT (Airport Transit). These routes connect the township with the city centre and various destinations within the city, such as the Penang International Airport, Batu Maung, Sungai Nibong and Gertak Sanggul. These routes are complemented by Rapid Penang's Congestion Alleviation Transport (CAT), a free-of-charge transit service within Bayan Baru.

In addition, Rapid Penang's cross-strait BEST shuttle services, BEST A and BEST B, are available for employees transiting between Bayan Baru and Seberang Perai on the mainland.

== Education ==
There are two primary schools and two high schools within Bayan Baru.

Primary schools

- SRK Bayan Baru
- SRK Seri Permai

High school

- SMK Raja Tun Uda
- Heng Ee High School (Bayan Baru Branch, Sungai Tiram)

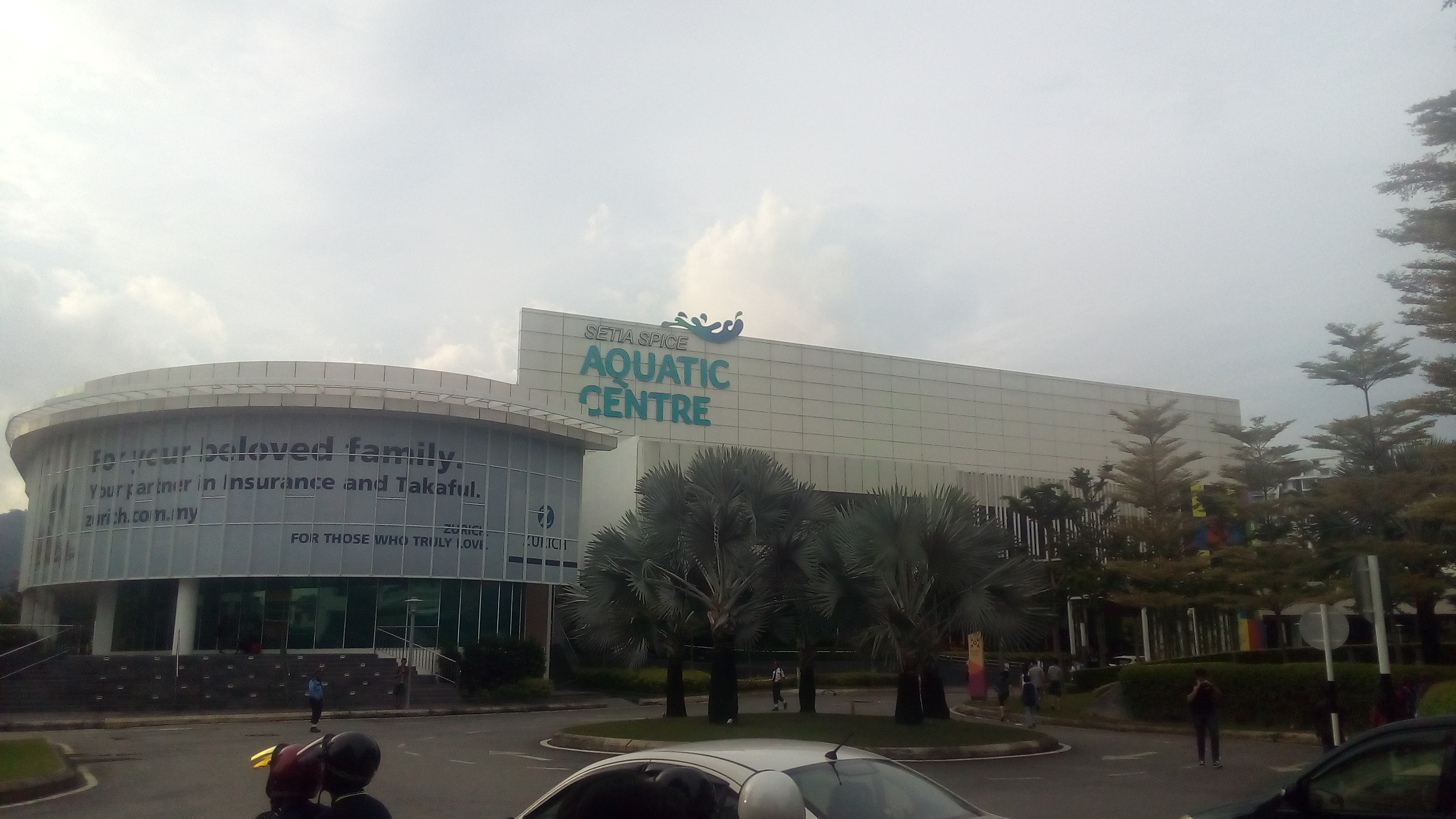
SPICE Aquatic Centre

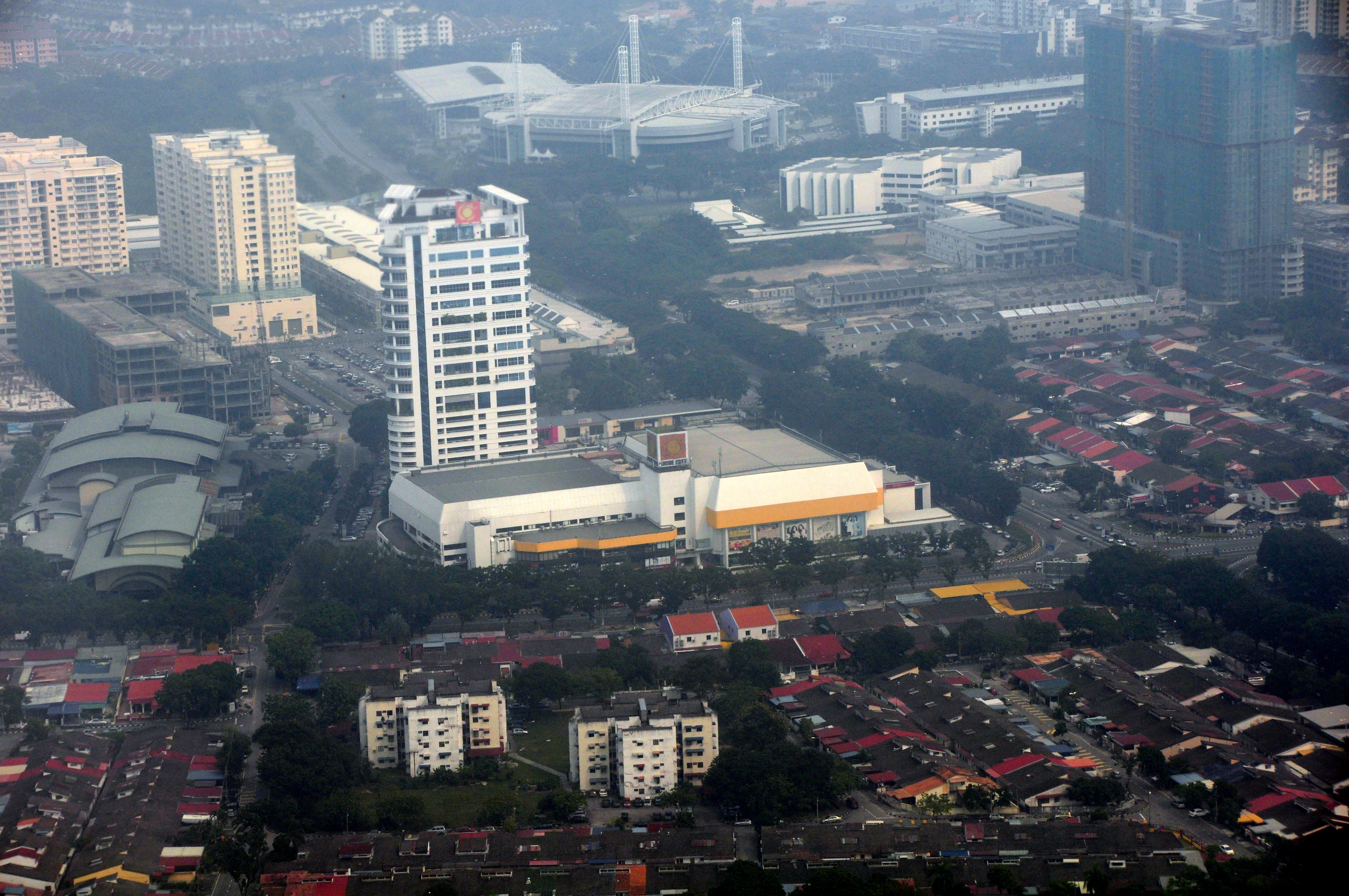
Sunshine Square, with Setia SPICE visible in the background.

== Health care ==
The 190-bed Pantai Hospital is the sole hospital within Bayan Baru. The private hospital, established in 1997, now forms part of Parkway Pantai's group of hospitals and offers specialist treatments for a variety of medical conditions.

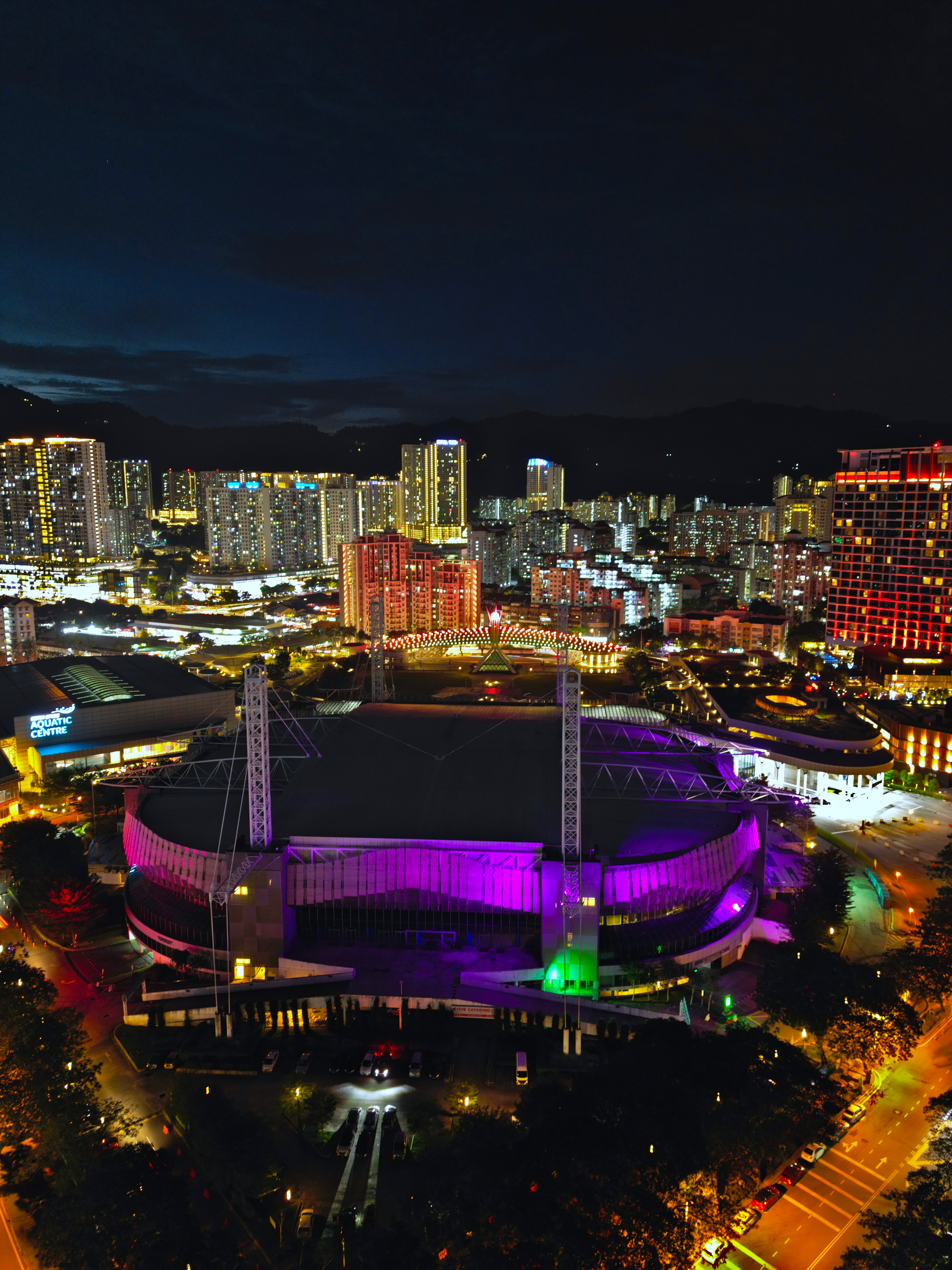
Setia SPICE

== Sports ==
Completed in 1997, Setia SPICE is one of the major sports venues in Penang, capable of hosting various indoor sports events, including squash, badminton and martial arts. It has also emerged as the preferred venue within Penang for meetings, incentives, conferences and exhibitions (MICE). Setia SPICE was recently renovated and is now complemented in its role as a MICE venue by the GBI-certified SPICE Convention & Exhibition Centre, the world's first hybrid solar-powered convention centre.

The SPICE Aquatics Centre not only serves as a venue for national and international aquatic sports events such as swimming and diving, it is also put to use as a community swimming facility when not in use for tournaments.

== Shopping ==
A number of shopping centres have been built within Bayan Baru to cater for a relatively sizable catchment area, including shoppers from the surrounding areas such as Bayan Lepas, Batu Maung and Sungai Nibong.

- Sunshine Square
- Giant Bayan Baru Hypermarket

== See also ==
- Bayan Lepas
