= Sunshine Square =

Department store in George Town, Penang, Malaysia

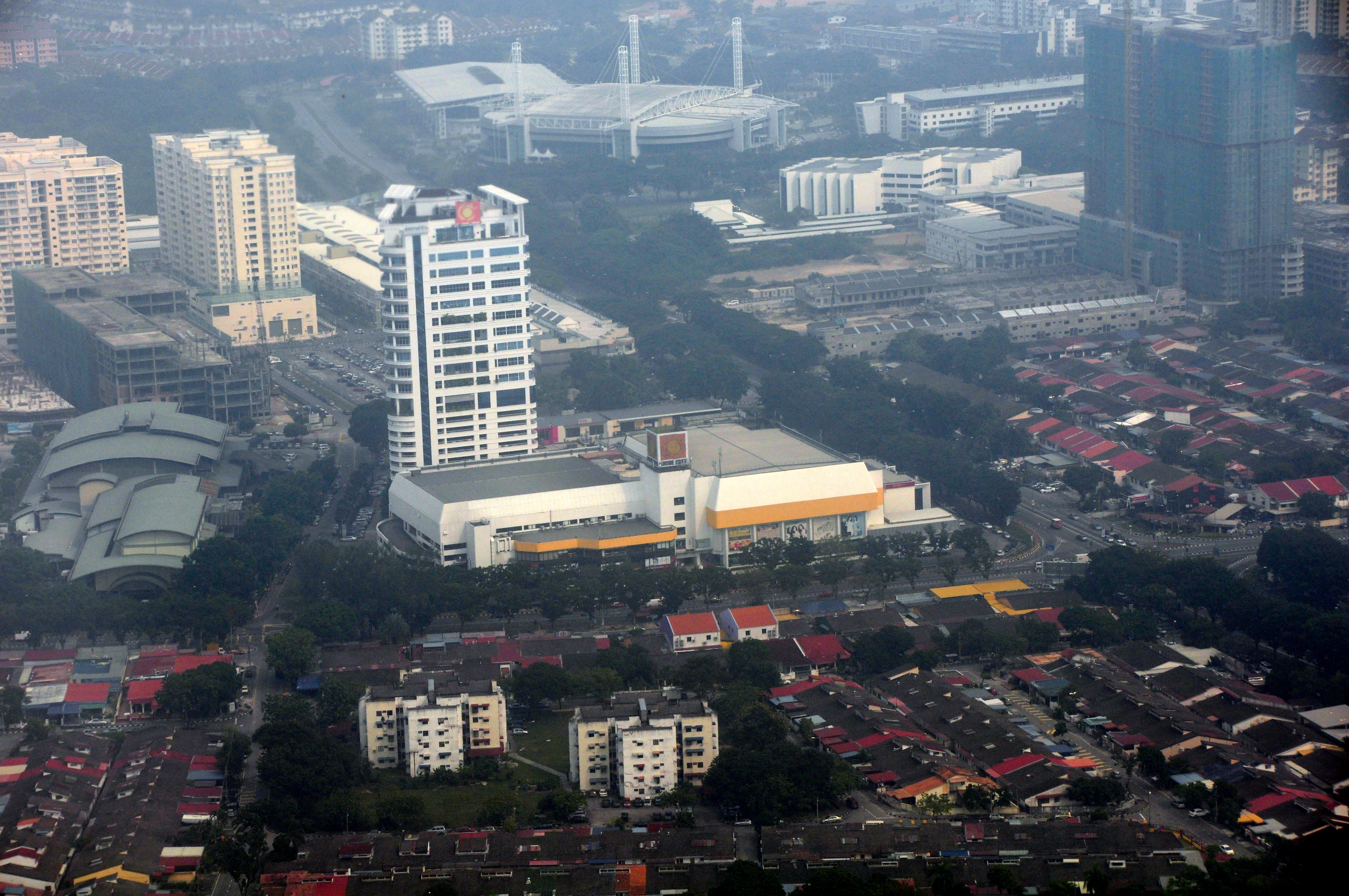
- Location: Bayan Baru, Penang, Malaysia
- Coordinates: 5.325594°N 100.287279°E
- Opened: 1993
- Owner: Suiwah Corporation Berhad
- Floor area: 148,534 sq ft (13,799.3 m^{2})
- Floors: 5

Sunshine Square is a department store within George Town in the Malaysian state of Penang. Located within the township of Bayan Baru, the five-storey shopping centre was opened in 1993 as the flagship store of the local retail firm, Suiwah Corporation.

== History ==
The department store was built by the Penang Development Corporation (PDC), the state-owned developer of the Bayan Baru township. Completed in 1993, Sunshine Square is one of the flagship stores of the local retail chain Suiwah Corporation, the other being Sunshine Central at Farlim. The shopping centre originally contained a cineplex and a bowling alley, although these have since been converted into function halls for meetings, incentives, conferences and exhibitions (MICE).

== Transport ==
Rapid Penang bus routes 302, 303, 304, 305, 306, 307, 308, 401E and CAT Bayan Baru include a stop at Sunshine Square.

== See also ==
- List of shopping malls in Malaysia
