= SUNTECH Tower =

Office building in George Town, Penang, Malaysia

Suntech @ Penang Cybercity
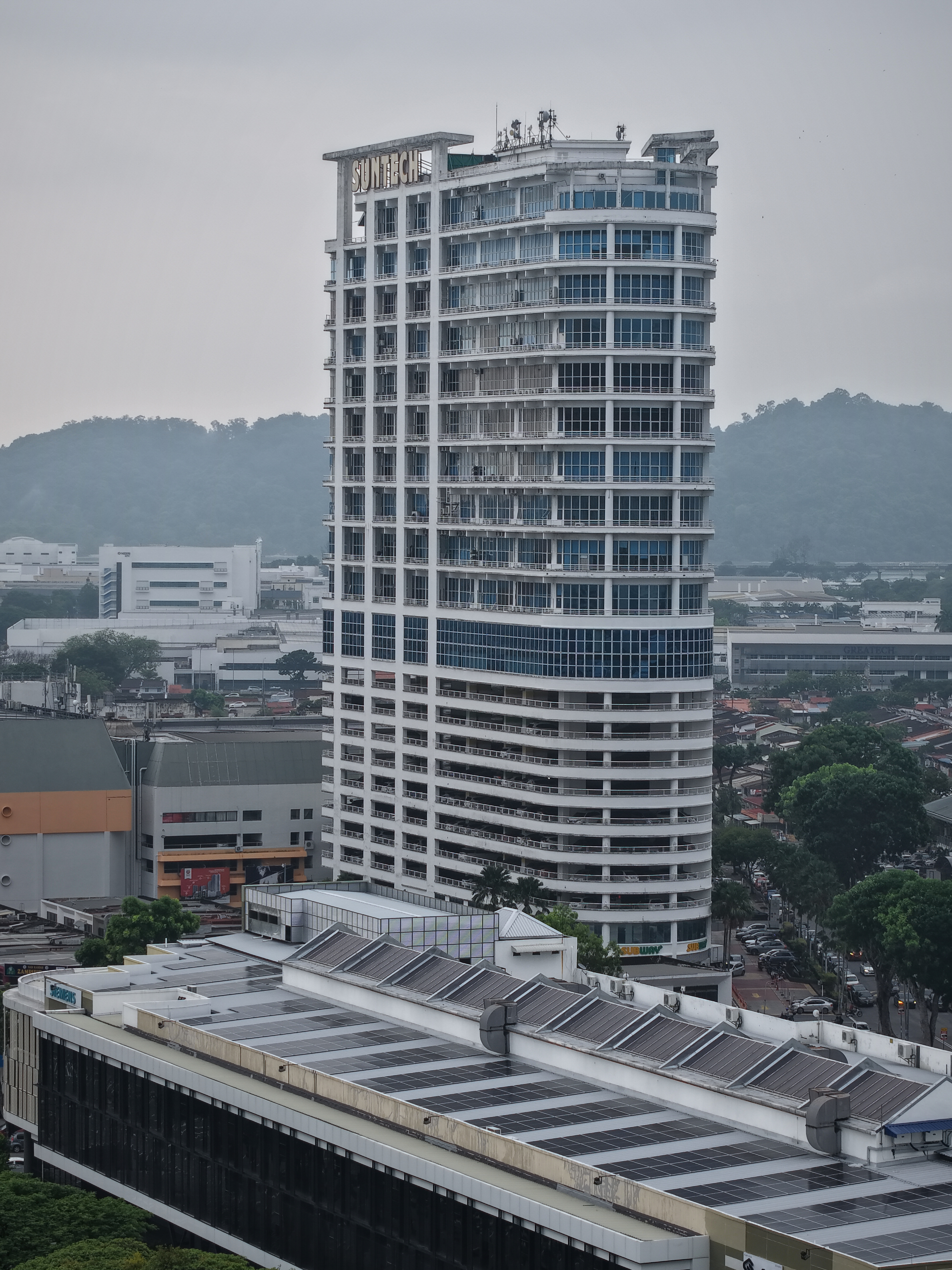
- Interactive map of the Suntech @ Penang Cybercity area

General information
- Location: Bayan Baru, Penang, Malaysia
- Construction started: 2006
- Completed: 2008
- Operator: Emerald Capital

Technical details
- Floor count: 22 (including ground floor)
- Lifts/elevators: 6 Otis Lifts

Design and construction
- Architect: Emerald Capital
- Main contractor: Rimbaco

The SUNTECH Tower (Suntech @ Penang Cybercity) is an office building within George Town in the Malaysian state of Penang. Located at the suburb of Bayan Baru, the tower is touted as the first in Penang to be designated an MSC-compliant building. The tower contains 22 levels (including ground floor), 240 office units (12th-21st floor) and 40 shoplots (Ground floor/1st floor).

== Location ==
Suntech is located in the heart of Bayan Baru township, a rapidly developing township with many facilities under the Penang Cybercity Phase 1.
