= History of George Town, Penang =

Background of the city of George Town, Penang

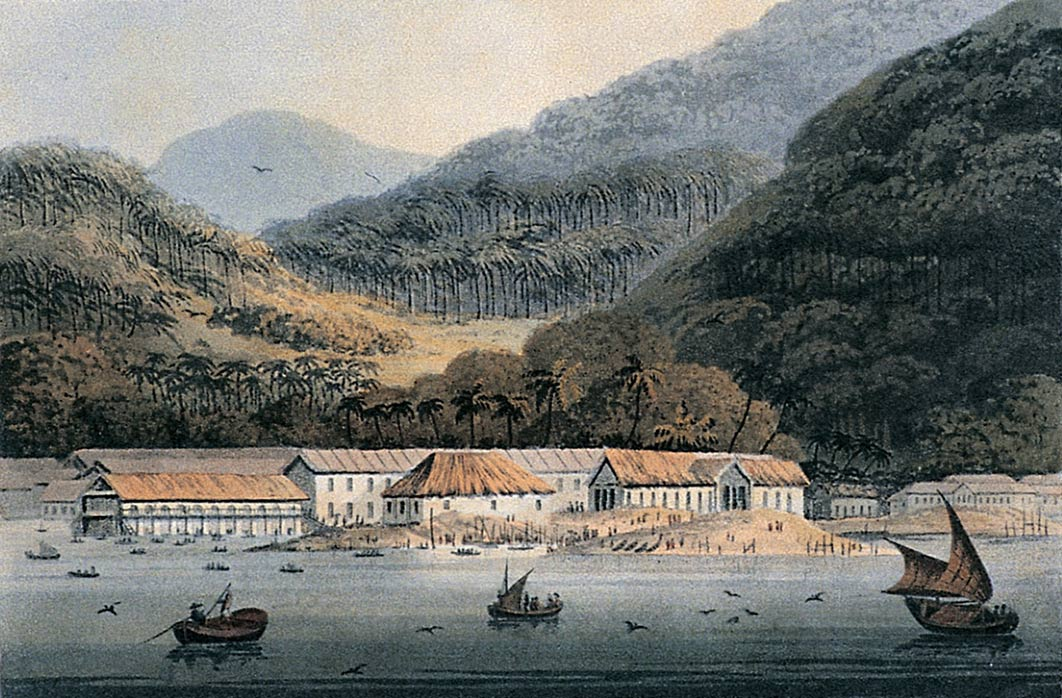
1811 painting of George Town

George Town, the capital city of the state of Penang, is the second largest city in Malaysia and the economic centre of the country's northern region. The history of George Town began with its establishment by Captain Francis Light of the British East India Company in 1786. Founded as a free port, George Town became the first British settlement in Southeast Asia and prospered in the 19th century as one of the vital British entrepôts within the region. It briefly became the capital of the Straits Settlements, a British crown colony which also consisted of Singapore and Malacca.

During World War II, George Town was militarily occupied by the Japanese Empire between 1941 and 1945. At the war's end, it became the first city in British Malaya to be liberated, under Operation Jurist. Following the dissolution of the Straits Settlements in 1946, Penang was merged into the Federation of Malaya (now Malaysia). Despite a secessionist movement that originated from the city, the merger with Malaya went ahead and the federation attained independence from the British Empire in 1957.

George Town became the first city in Malaya, and by extension, Malaysia, when in 1957, it was granted city status by Queen Elizabeth II. In addition, the city centre has been inscribed as a UNESCO World Heritage Site since 2008. Today, the city, well known for its cultural diversity, colonial-era architecture and street food, is a booming tourist destination and still serves as the financial centre of northern Malaysia.

Historical affiliations	Period
Kedah Sultanate	1136–1786
British East India Company	1786–1867
Straits Settlements	1826–1941; 1945–1946
Empire of Japan	1941–1945
Malayan Union	1946–1948
Federation of Malaya	1948–1963
Malaysia	1963 – present

== Establishment ==
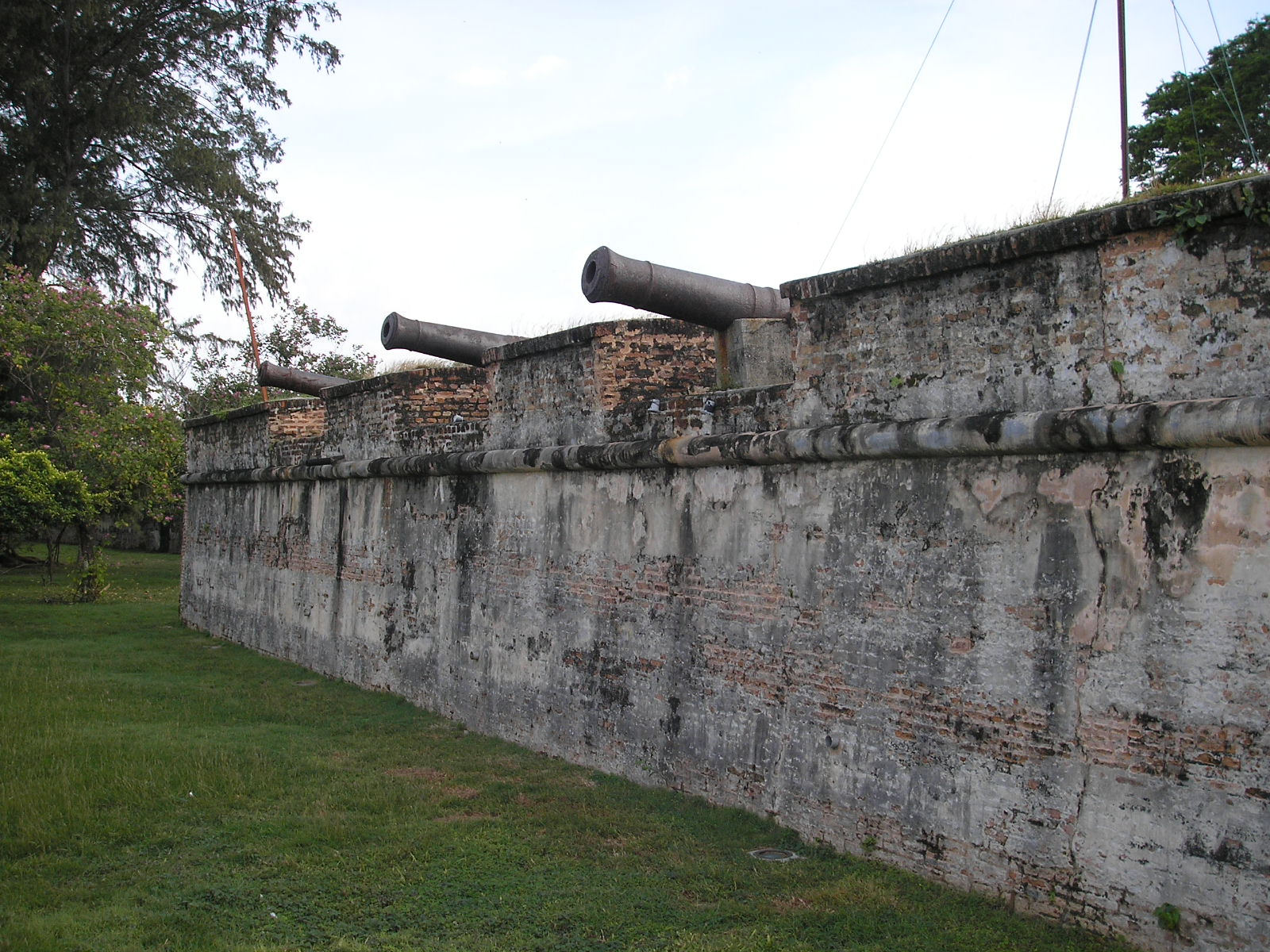
Fort Cornwallis, in the heart of George Town, was constructed at the spot where Francis Light first set foot on Penang Island.

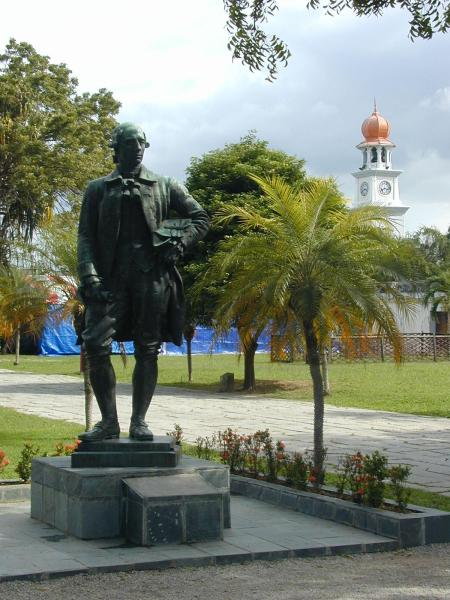
A bronze statue of Francis Light still stands within Fort Cornwallis to this day.

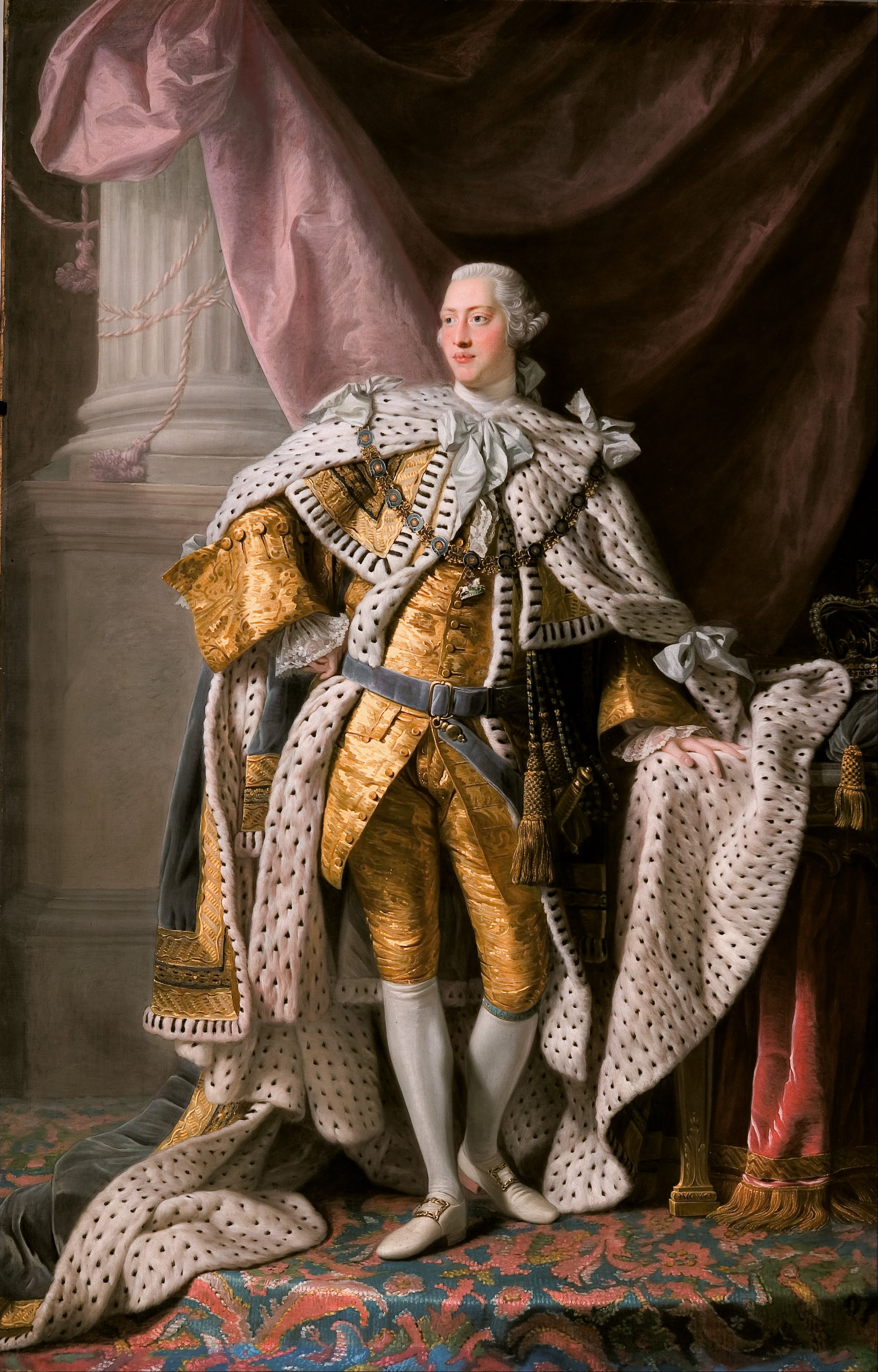
George Town was named after King George III, who ruled the British Empire between 1760 and 1801.

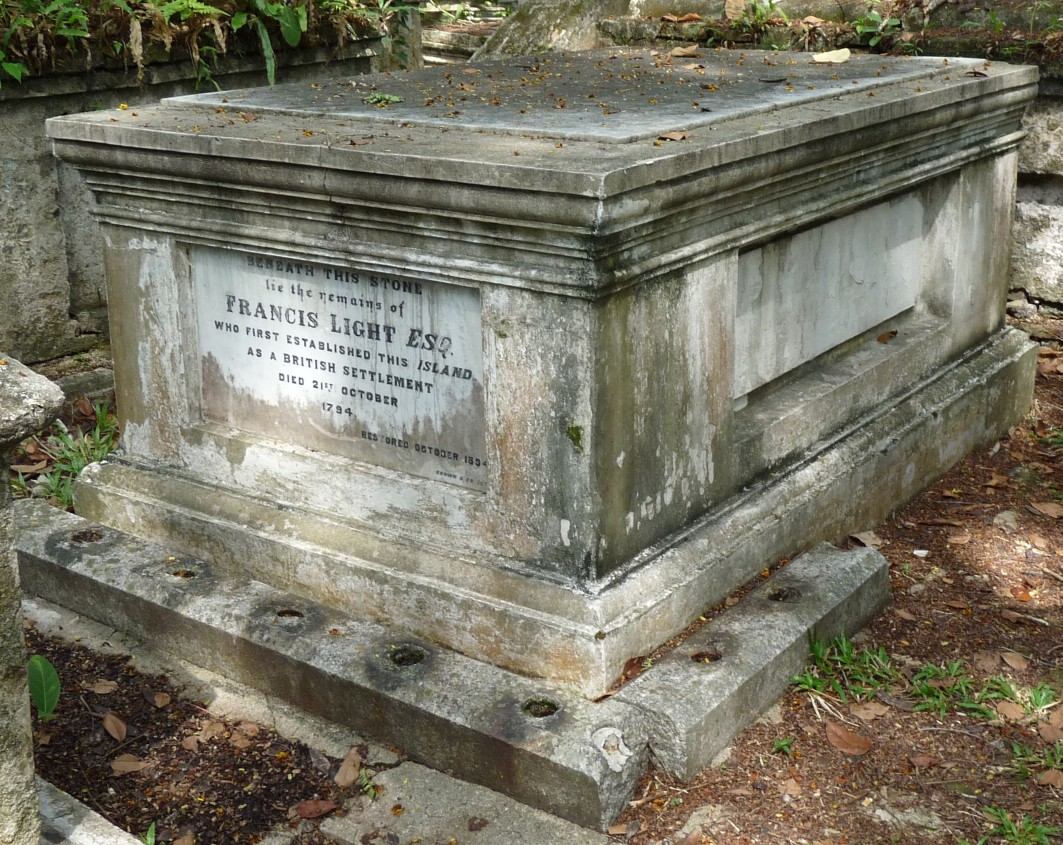
Francis Light's grave in the Old Protestant Cemetery in George Town.

For centuries prior to the arrival of the British East India Company in the Malay Peninsula in the late 18th century, Penang Island had formed part of the Sultanate of Kedah. As a Siamese vassal kingdom, Kedah had maintained an uneasy and somewhat turbulent diplomatic relationship with its mightier northern neighbour.

In the 1770s, the British East India Company, seeking to expand its presence into Southeast Asia, instructed Francis Light to form trade relations in the Malay Peninsula. At the time, in the aftermath of the Burmese–Siamese War, Kedah was facing the threat of military invasion by both Siam and Burma, as well as an internal Bugis rebellion.

Aware of the unfolding situation, Light landed in Kedah, proceeded to form cordial relations with the then sultan of Kedah, Muhammad Jiwa Zainal Adilin II, and promised British military assistance. To illustrate his commitment, Light led a force to recapture a Bugis-held fort for the sultan, who reciprocated by offering Penang Island. Light subsequently wrote to his superiors regarding the offer, arguing that Penang Island could serve as a "convenient magazine for trade", and its strategic location would allow the British to check Dutch and French territorial gains in Southeast Asia. He added that, with the other ports in the region, such as Aceh and Phuket, riddled with piracy and ruled by despotic governments, the British East India Company could seize the opportunity to establish a tranquil harbour on Penang Island conducive for free trade, also noting that if "Malay, Bugis and Chinese will come to reside here, it will become the Exchange of the East if not loaded with impositions and restrictions".

However, nothing materialised until 1786, when Light was finally ordered to acquire Penang Island from Kedah. By then, the British were fighting the Thirteen American Colonies, which were backed by France and the Netherlands. Faced with the Dutch dominance of the East Indies (now Indonesia) and a growing French threat, the British East India Company sought control of Penang Island as a Royal Navy repair base, and a trading post between China and the Indian subcontinent.

Light negotiated the cession of Penang Island to the British East India Company with the new sultan of Kedah, Abdullah Mukarram Shah, in exchange for British military protection and a lease of 6,000 Spanish dollars to pay off Kedah's debts to Siam. With the agreement between Light and the Kedah sultan fruitfully concluded, Light and his entourage sailed on to Penang Island, where they arrived on 17 July 1786.

The site where Light first landed was originally a mangrove swamp covered in thick jungle. To expedite the clearing of the vegetation, Light ordered his vessels to fire silver coins into the jungle. Fort Cornwallis would later be constructed at the spot where Light first set foot.

Once enough land was cleared, creating what is now the Esplanade, a simple ceremony was held on 11 August, during which the Union Jack was flown for the first time. This marked the formal possession of Penang Island by the British East India Company in the name of King George III. The island was renamed the Prince of Wales Island after the heir to the British throne, while the new settlement of George Town was founded in honour of King George III.

Thus, George Town became the first British settlement in Southeast Asia and heralded the start of British colonialism in the Malay Peninsula. Indeed, during the next century, the settlement would serve as a springboard for further British expansion of territory and influence in the region.

Unbeknownst to Sultan Abdullah, however, Light had acted with neither the authority nor the approval of his superiors in India. When Light reneged on his promise of British military assistance against Siam, in 1791 the Kedah sultan assembled an army and a fleet of pirates in what is now Seberang Perai to recapture the Prince of Wales Island. In response, the British East India Company reinforced the garrison on the island with two companies from Calcutta. Having failed to persuade the sultan to disband his forces, the British East India Company attacked and defeated the Kedah forces, destroying a Kedah fort in Perai in the process.

Light died from malaria in 1794 and was buried within the city's Old Protestant Cemetery at Northam Road. To this day, Light is regarded as the founding father of Penang.

== Early growth ==
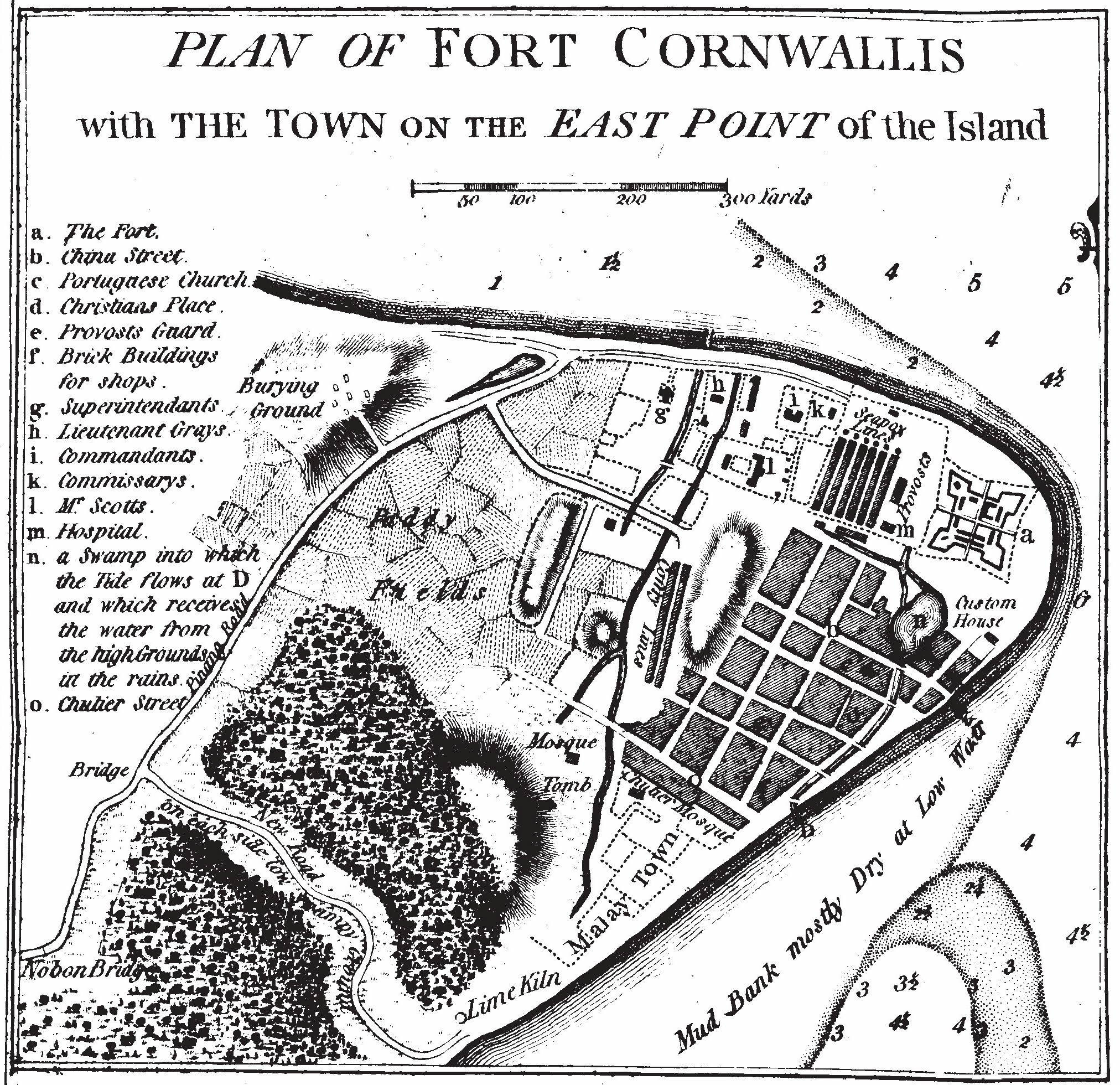
A 1799 map of George Town

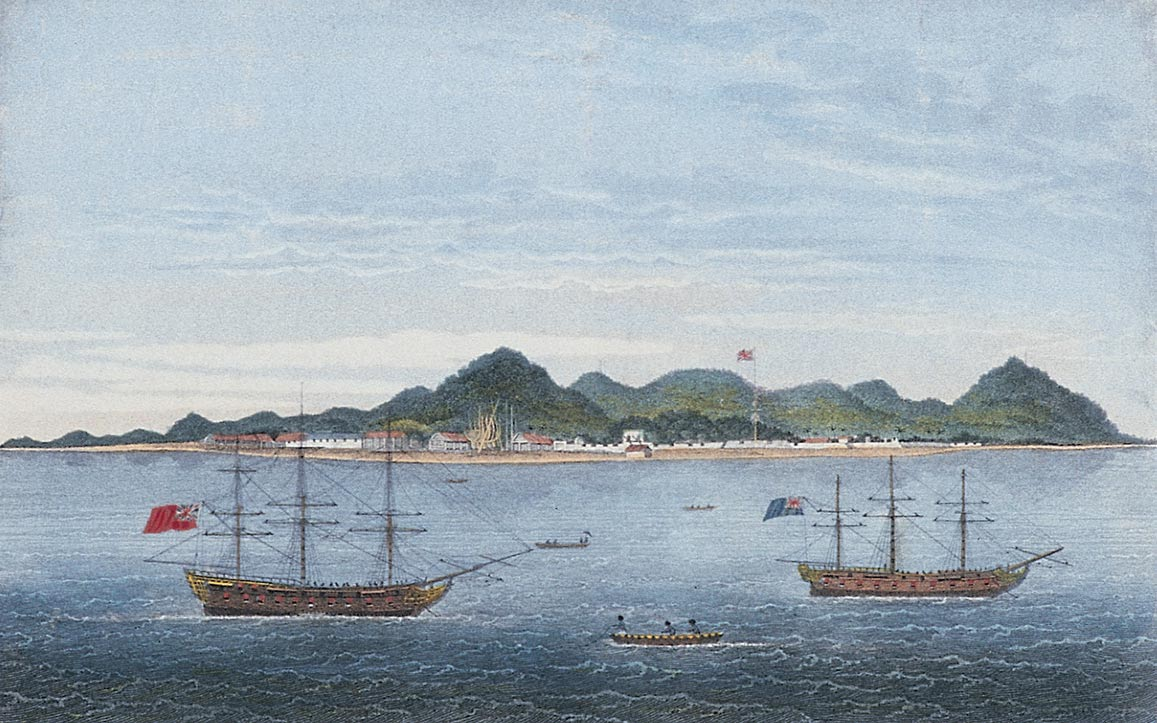
An 1810 engraving depicting the eastern side of George Town

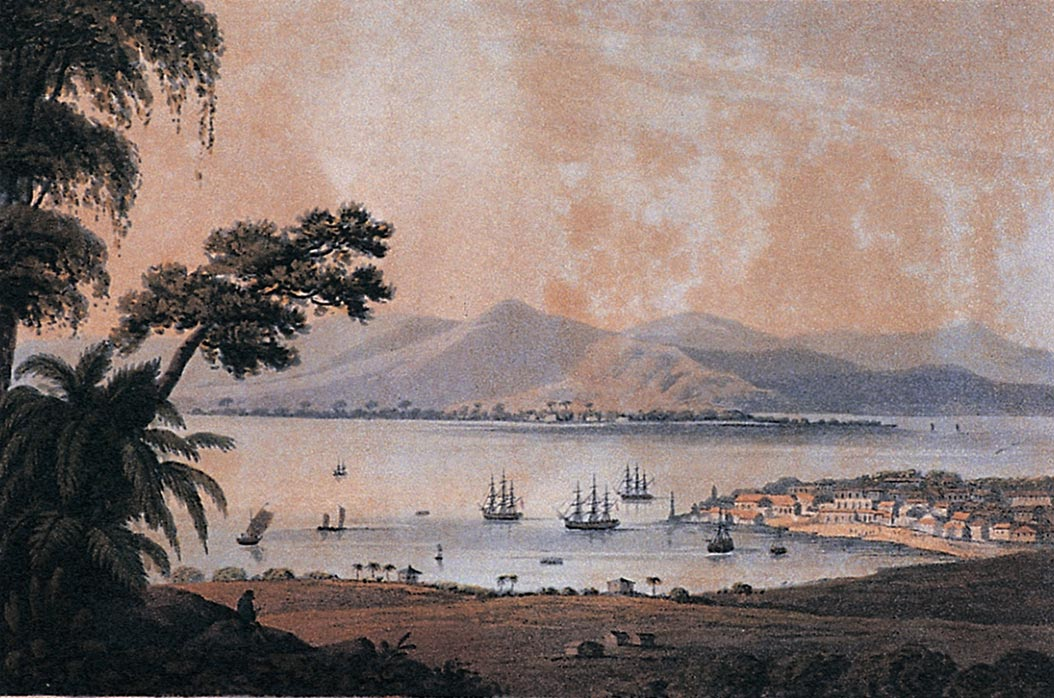
1814 print of a view overlooking George Town

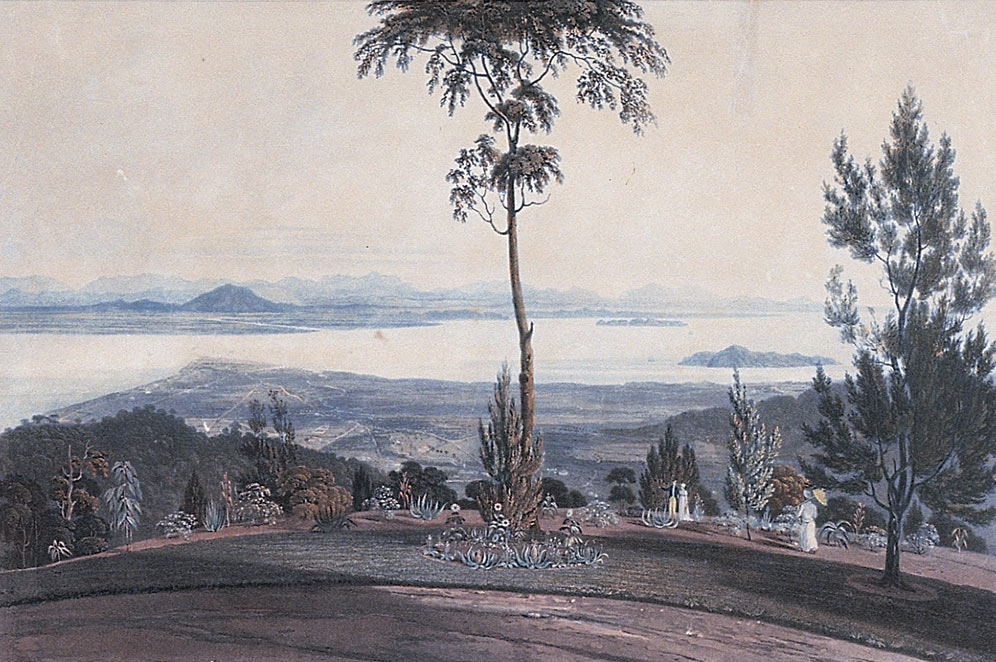
An 1818 painting depicting George Town and Province Wellesley (in the horizon), as seen from a hilltop.

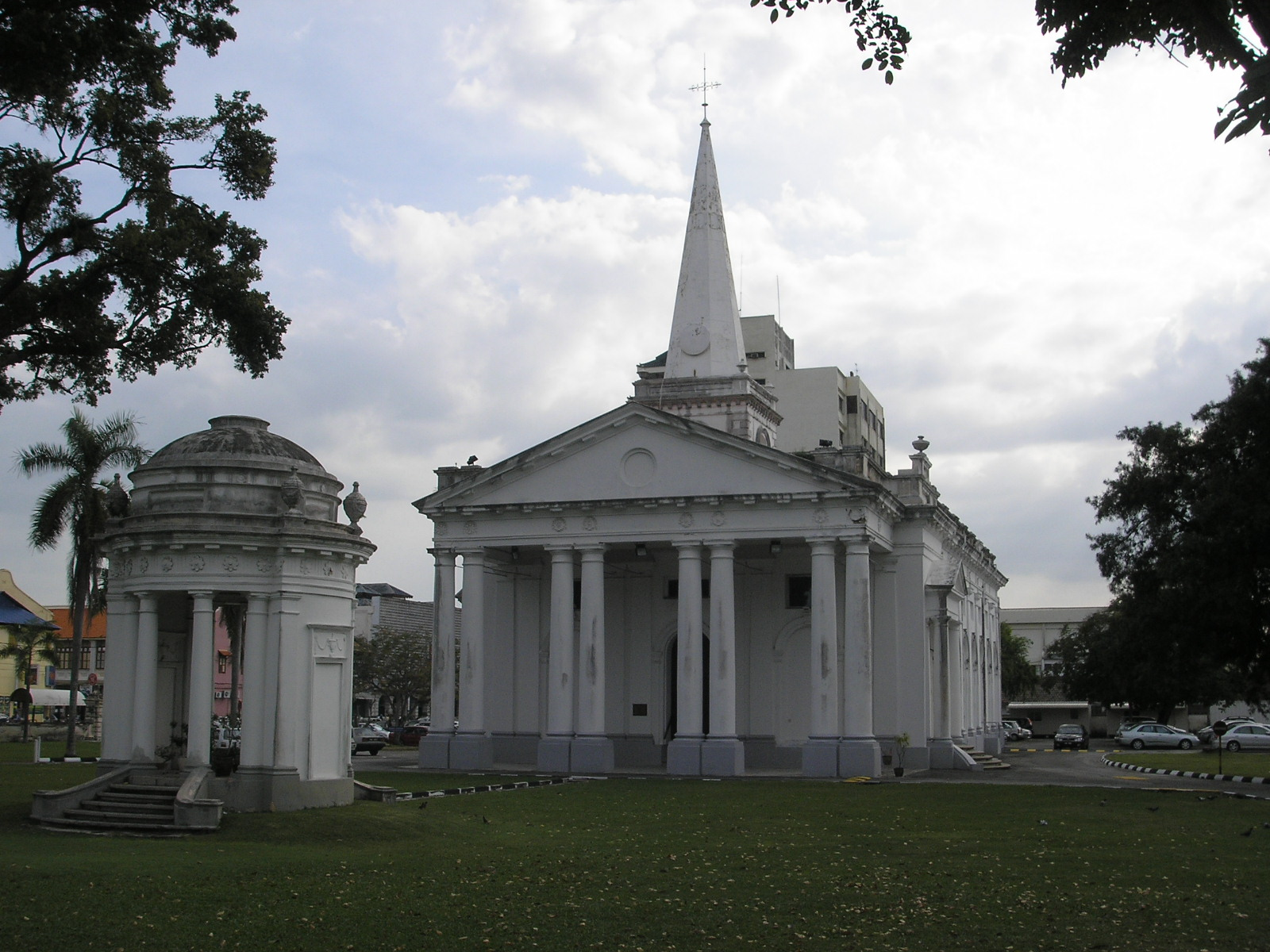
St. George's Church, at Farquhar Street, was founded in 1816, making it the oldest Anglican church in Southeast Asia.

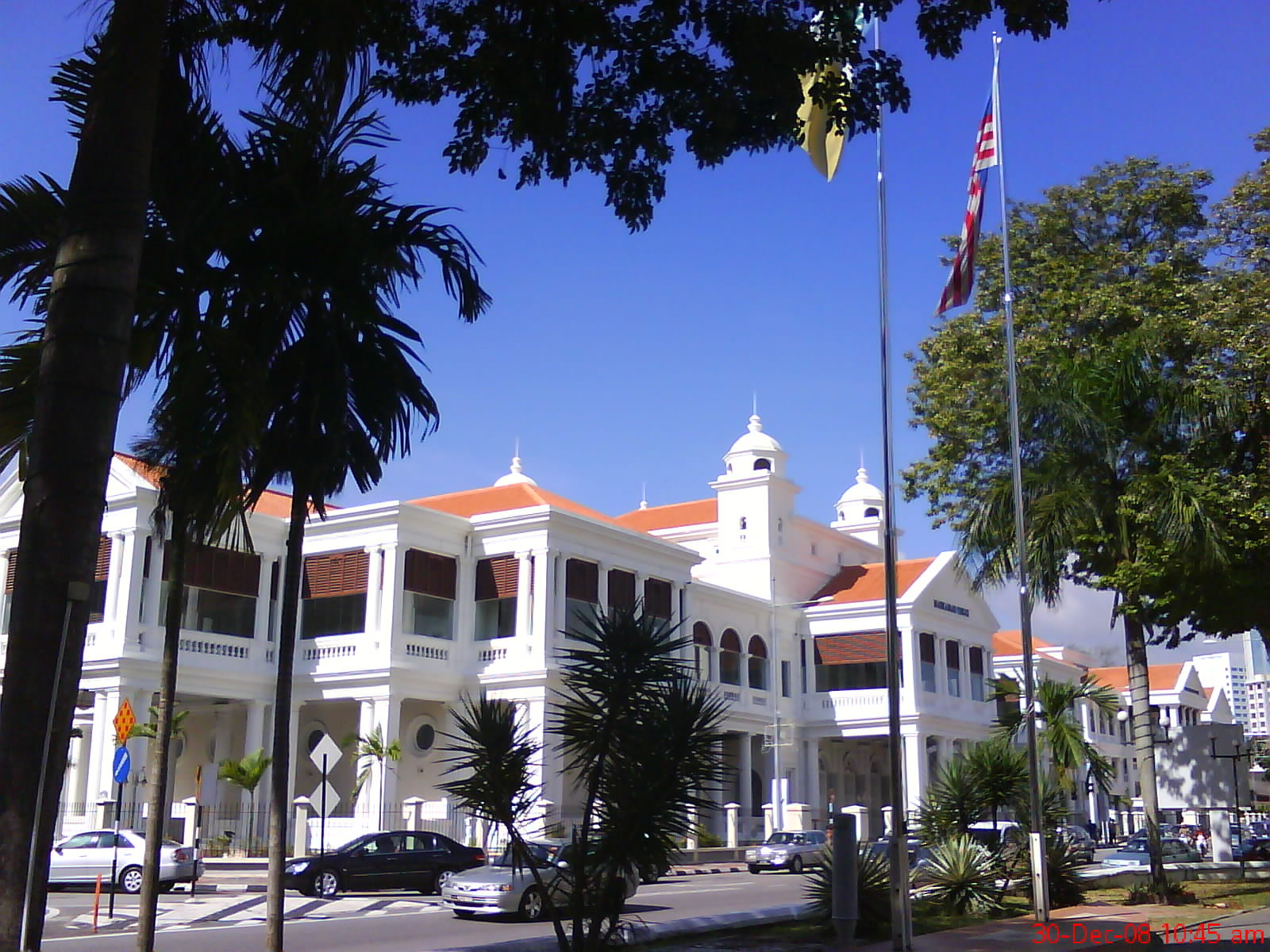
The High Court of Penang, the birthplace of Malaysia's modern-day judiciary, was established in 1808. It was subsequently moved to its current grounds at Light Street, where it remains to this day.

Francis Light had established George Town as a free port to entice merchants from the Dutch ports in the region. Attracted by the promise of free trade without having to pay any form of tax or duties, and assured of their safety at the British-governed harbour, merchants flocked into George Town; consequently, the number of incoming vessels rose exponentially from 85 in 1786 to 3,569 in 1802. The population of the new settlement had also increased to 10,000 by 1792. Immigrants arrived from various parts of Asia; in 1801, the then lieutenant-governor of the Prince of Wales Island, Sir George Leith, commented that "there is not, probably, any part of the world where, in so small a space, so many different people are assembled together or so great a variety of languages spoken".

At the height of the Napoleonic Wars, the British East India Company enlarged and rearmed Fort Cornwallis. The Royal Navy based a small squadron under Admiral Troubridge at the island in 1805, but withdrew it in 1806. A small shipyard was established that launched its first vessel in 1806. It built few vessels and was closed in 1811 or 1812. The last large vessel built there was Countess of Harcourt.

Soon after the establishment of George Town, pepper cultivation was introduced onto the Prince of Wales Island. Spice farms were opened in the interior of the island, while other spices, including local variants of nutmeg and clove, also began to be harvested. In the early 19th century, Penang, which by then comprised both the Prince of Wales Island and a strip of the Malay Peninsula named Province Wellesley (now Seberang Perai), emerged as a centre of spice production and trade within Southeast Asia. The Port of Penang in George Town functioned as a conduit, through which agricultural produce from the spice farms further inland were exported. The export of spice also allowed the British East India Company to cover the administrative costs for Penang.

George Town was originally developed haphazardly, as buildings and streets were constructed ad hoc. The new settlement, arranged in a grid pattern, was bounded by four streets - Light Street, Beach Street, Chulia Street and Pitt Street. The segregation of George Town's commercial and administrative precincts, as well as ethnic enclaves, can still be seen today; with Light Street serving as an administrative precinct where government and judicial offices are concentrated.

A committee of assessors for George Town was established in 1800, making it the first local government to be established within British Malaya. The committee, which consisted of British and local Asian ratepayers, was tasked with the valuation of property within the new settlement.

In 1807, Penang was conferred a royal charter that provided for the establishment of a Supreme Court and a police force. The Supreme Court of Penang was first opened at Fort Cornwallis in the following year, with Edmond Stanley assuming office as its first Recorder (Judge). In the following decades, Penang's judiciary and police force were progressively extended to the whole of the Straits Settlements, and later copied throughout British Malaya. Hence, George Town became the birthplace of the present-day Malaysian judiciary system, as well as the Royal Malaysian Police.

== Straits Settlements ==
Original flag of the Straits Settlements, in use between 1874 and 1925

Flag of the Straits Settlements between 1925 and 1941

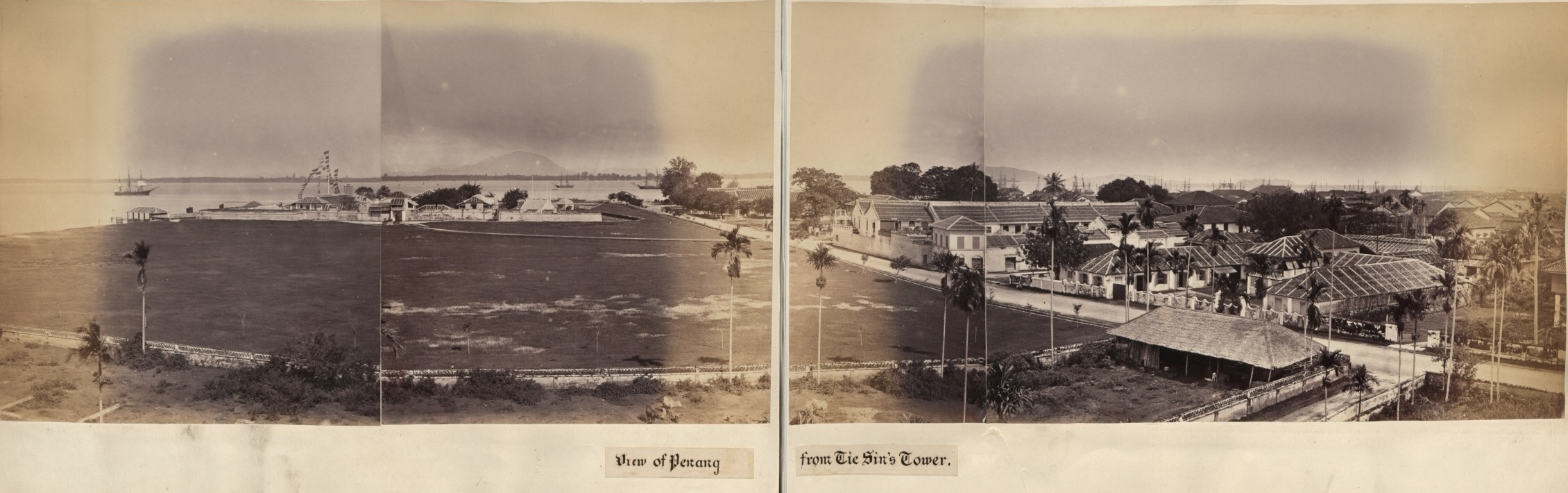
Panoramic image of George Town in the late 19th century, with the city's Esplanade in the foreground.

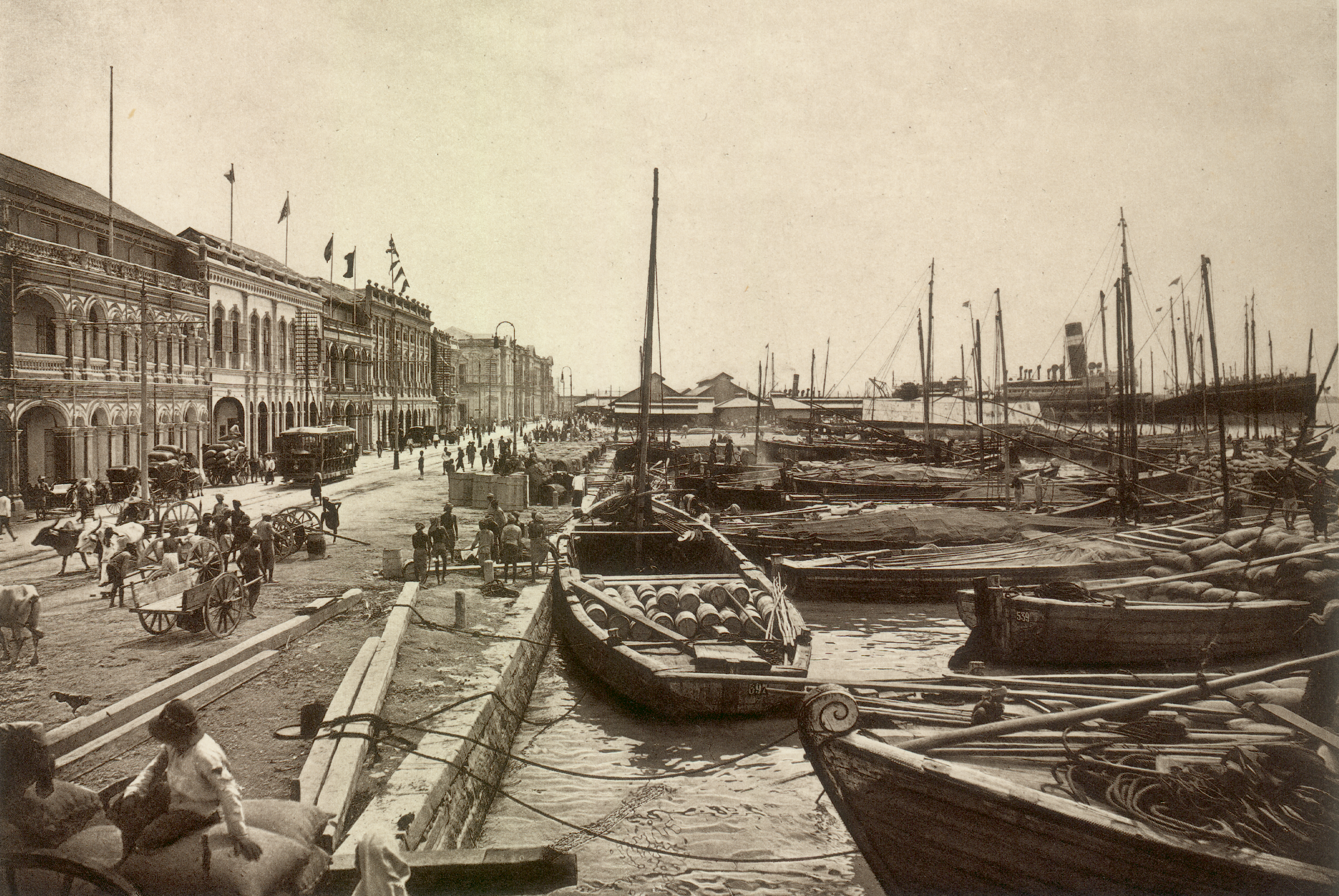
The Port of Penang at Weld Quay in 1910. Weld Quay was reclaimed from the sea in the 1880s.

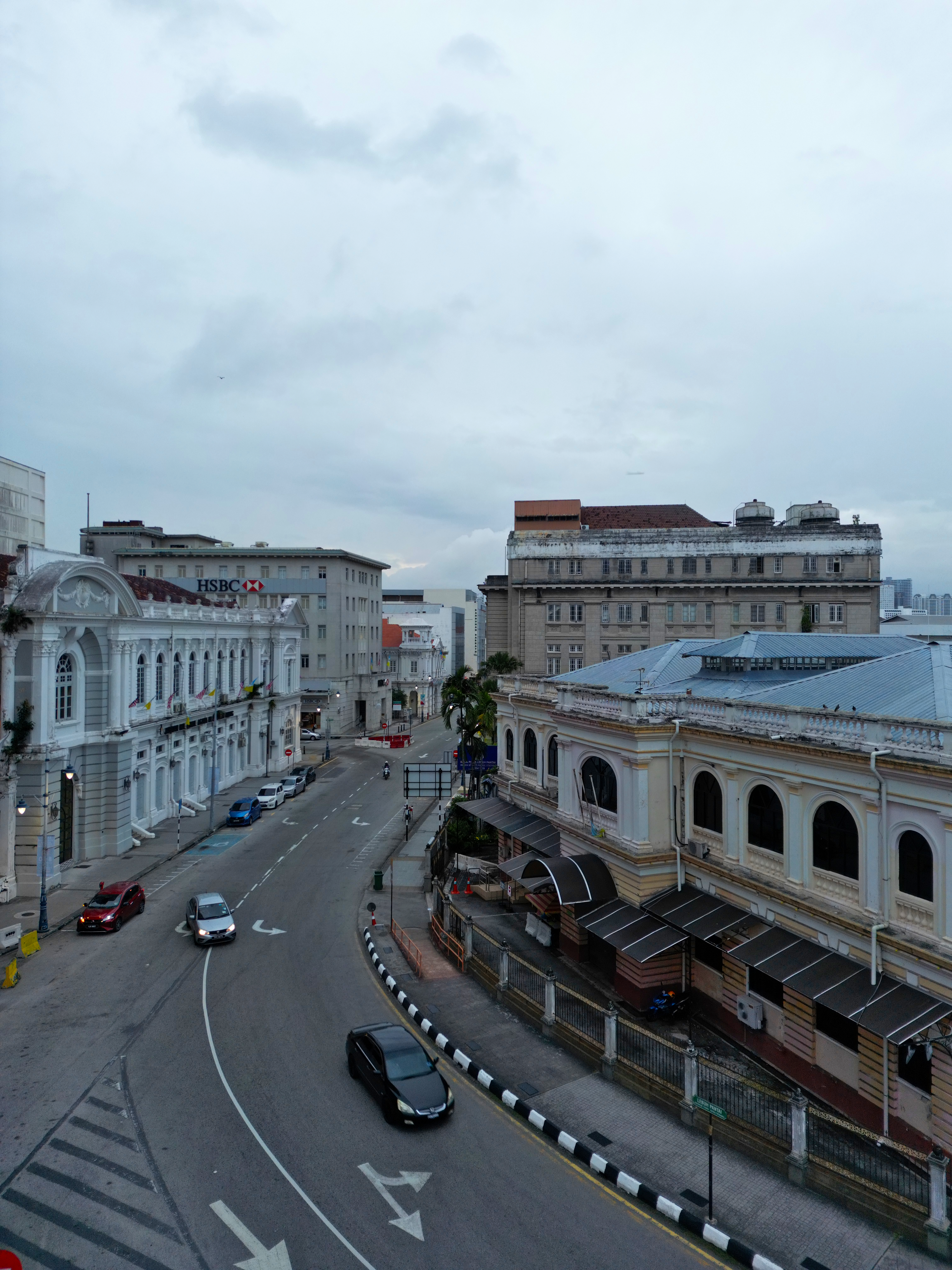
Beach Street, traditionally the mercantile centre of the city, remains an integral part of George Town's Central Business District.

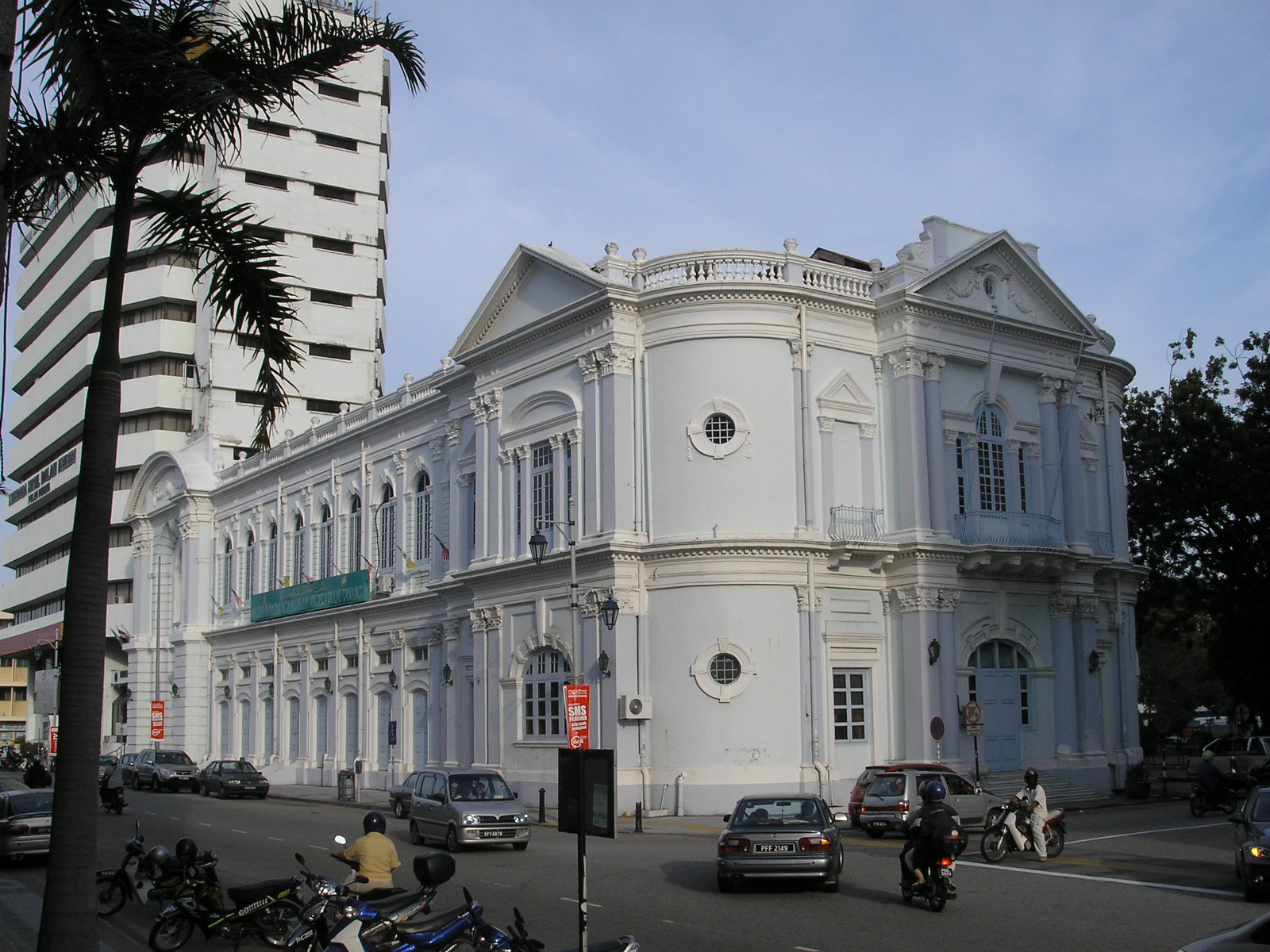
The Government Offices at Weld Quay was constructed to house the government offices for the colony of Penang. However, much of the building was destroyed during World War II. Only this portion remains standing to this day.

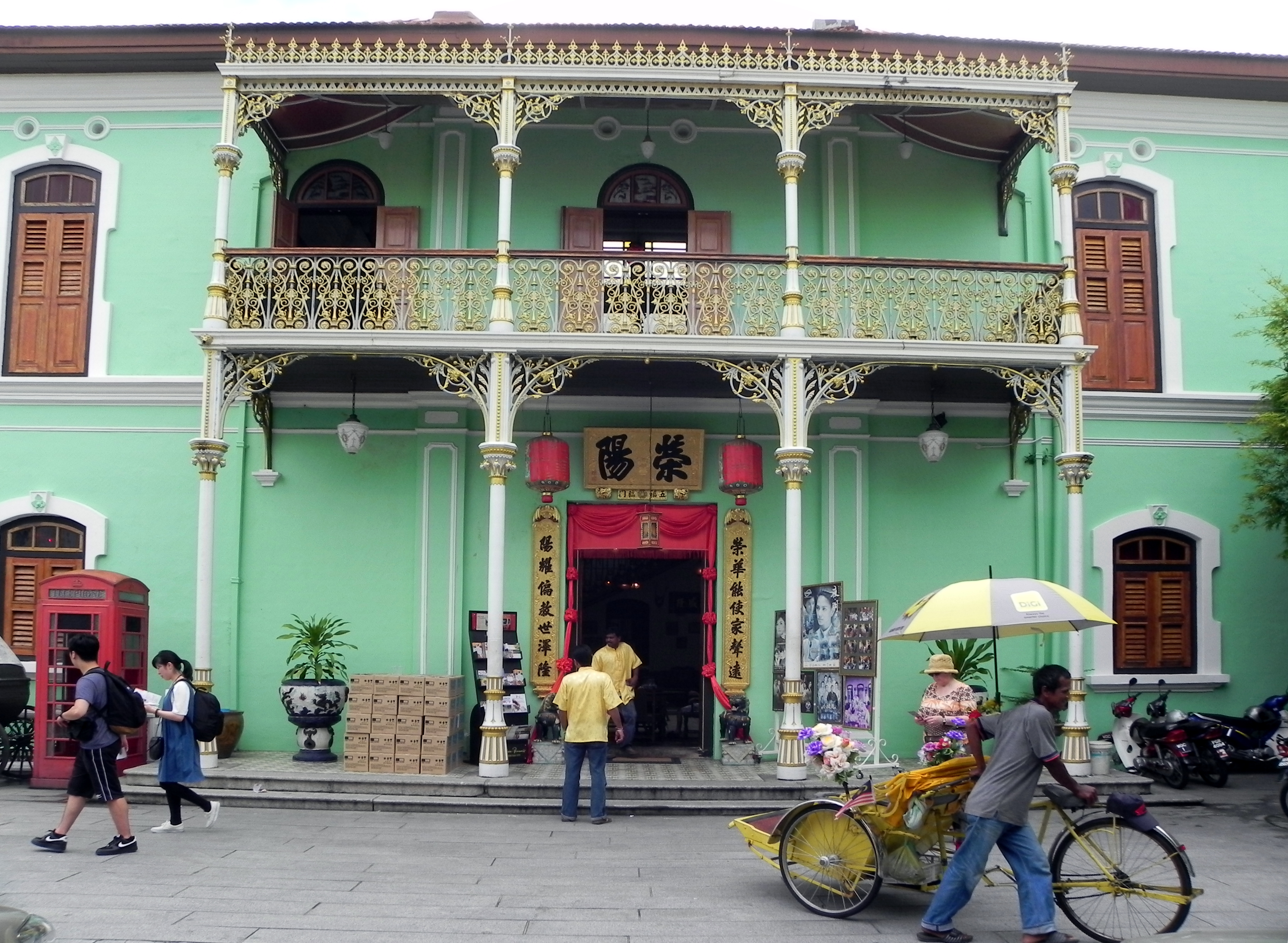
The city's Pinang Peranakan Mansion is an exquisite example of Peranakan architecture and interior design.

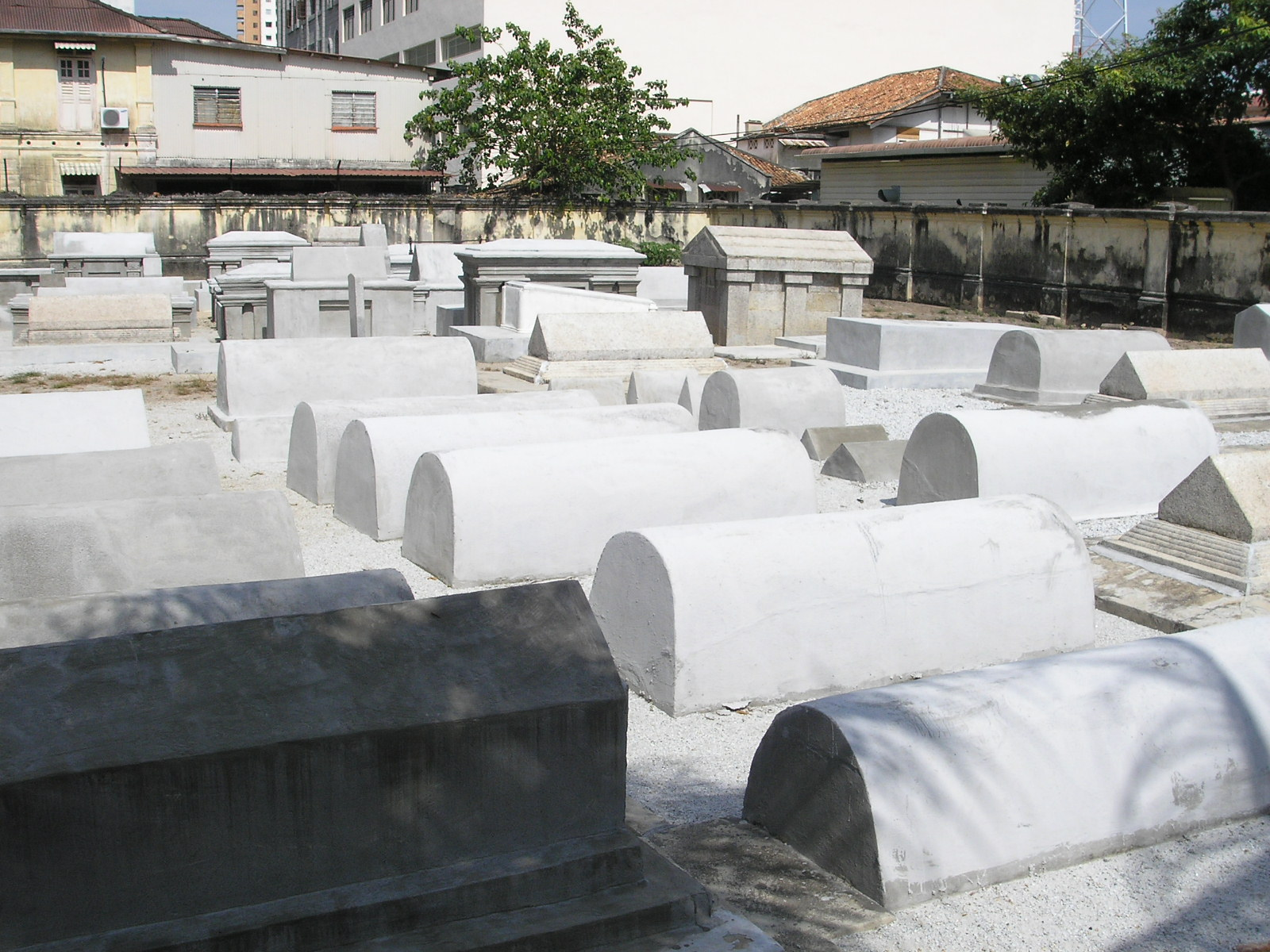
The Jewish Cemetery in George Town. Today, the Jewish community no longer exists, with the passing of the last Jew in 2011.

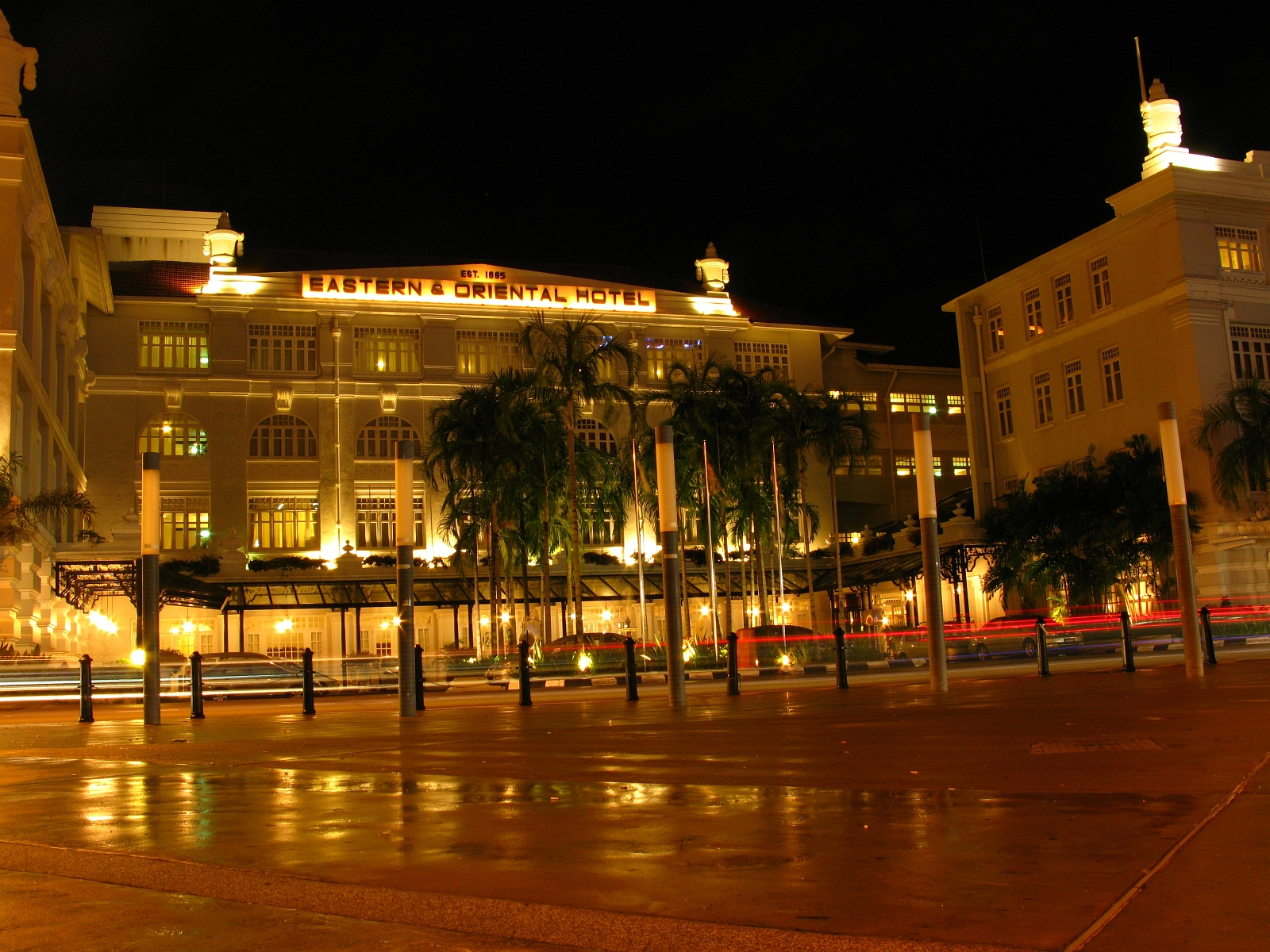
The Eastern & Oriental Hotel was founded in the 1880s by the Armenian Sarkies Brothers, who went on to establish similar hotels throughout Southeast Asia, such as Singapore's Raffles Hotel.

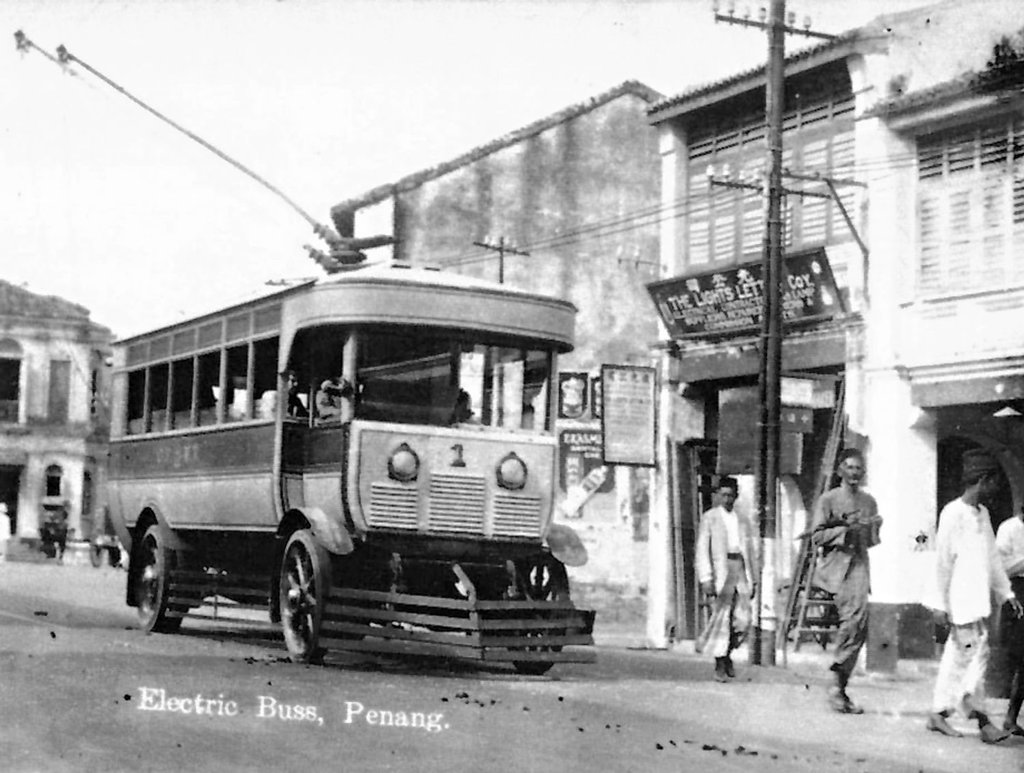
A trolleybus in George Town in 1926

In 1826, the British East India Company consolidated its territories of Penang, Singapore and Malacca into a single political entity, the Straits Settlements. George Town was made the capital of this new entity. However, owing to Singapore's more strategic geographical position between the Malacca Strait and the South China Sea, the Port of Singapore rapidly surpassed the Port of Penang as the preeminent harbour in the region. Prompted by this development, in 1832, Singapore replaced George Town as the capital of the Straits Settlements in 1832. Even so, George Town remained the seat of the Straits Settlements judiciary until 1855.

Although its importance became secondary to Singapore's, George Town remained a vital British entrepôt within Southeast Asia, funneling the exports meant for global shipping lines which had bypassed other regional harbours. In the latter half of the 19th century, the tin mining boom in the neighbouring Sultanate of Perak and southern Siam brought more prosperity to the city. Tin from the Kinta Valley and Siam were shipped to George Town for smelting, before being exported via the Port of Penang to European and American industries. The Port of Penang subsequently became a major conduit for the export of tin from British Malaya, directly challenging the Port of Singapore. The launch of the Suez Canal in 1869 and the advent of steamships further cemented the Port of Penang's importance. These factors were crucial, as it established the Malacca Strait as part of the main sea route between Europe and Asia, with George Town as the first port-of-call east of the Indian subcontinent and a vital link in the international telegraph lines.

In 1857, the George Town Municipal Commission, which consisted of five members and led by the resident-councillor of Penang, was formed. Three of the municipal commissioners were to be elected by expatriate ratepayers and Straits-born British citizens, making the Municipal Commission the first, albeit partially, elected local government within British Malaya. However, the local elections were abolished by 1913.

By then, Penang became home to a myriad of ethnicities and religious affinities. Aside from the sizeable Chinese, Malay, Indian, Peranakan, Eurasian and Siamese communities, there were significant minorities of Burmese, British, Javanese, Japanese, Sinhalese, Jewish, German and Armenian origin. At the time, each ethnic community had a tendency to specialise in particular trades and economic sectors. While the Europeans predominated in the various professional fields, and ran mercantile and shipping firms, the Peranakans and the Eurasians tended to enter the nascent civil service as lawyers, engineers, architects and clerks. Some of the newer Chinese arrivals, labelled derisively by the Peranakans as Sinkheh (Chinese: 新客; new guests), were coolies and agricultural farmers, although many eventually entered into commercial, trading and real estate enterprises within the city; certain dialect communities, such as the Cantonese and the Hakka, found employment as artisans, blacksmiths, carpenters and cooks. The Indians were first brought in as convict workers for public works, such as public buildings, roads and drains, although a substantial Indian Muslim community also competed with the Chinese in commercial, trading and shipping stevedore activities. The Malays, meanwhile, were primarily engaged in agricultural occupations, including rice farming and fishing. Other ethnic groups, such as the Jews and the Armenians, were mainly active in mercantile, commercial and hospitality ventures, such as the Eastern & Oriental Hotel.

Due to the influx of Chinese immigrants, the Chinese became the largest ethnic community within George Town by the 1850s, and remains so to this day. The ethnic enclaves within the city shifted with the gradual change in demographics. For instance, Chulia Street, which had been home to significant numbers of ethnic Indians, became dominated by Chinese immigrants by the turn of the century. Meanwhile, the Europeans, including British officials, preferred quieter suburban areas to the west, such as Northam Road, Anson Road and Residency Road.

The rapid population growth that resulted from the booming economy led to a number of social problems, chiefly the inadequate sanitation and public health facilities, as well as rampant crime. The latter was brought about by the influx of Chinese, which led to the formation of rival triads and secret societies. Turf wars between the triads grew in intensity, and when the Straits Settlements authorities attempted to enforce new municipal laws in 1857, the Chinese triads came into conflict against the British-led police force as well. This culminated in the Penang Riots of 1867, when the Kean Teik Tong, led by Khoo Thean Teik and the Red Flag, clashed against the alliance of the Ghee Hin Kongsi and the White Flag in the streets of George Town. The resulting civil unrest lasted for 10 days, before the turf war was eventually put down by the Straits Settlements authorities under newly appointed Lieutenant-Governor Edward Anson, who were assisted by European residents and reinforcements from Singapore.

Also in the same year, the Straits Settlements was made a British crown colony, thereby transferring the administration of Penang, Singapore and Malacca from British India into the hands of the Colonial Office in London. Direct British rule meant better enforcement of the rule of law, as Penang's police force was vastly improved and the secret societies that had plagued George Town during the preceding decades were gradually outlawed, although underground triads persisted in industrial areas such as Jelutong until well into the 1980s.

By the end of the 19th century, George Town also evolved into a leading financial centre of British Malaya, as mercantile firms and international banks, including Standard Chartered and HSBC, established regional branches within the city. Land reclamation in the 1880s provided greater space for the booming Port of Penang and allowed for the construction of the Government Offices, which became the seat of government for Penang. Investments on innovative urban public transportation meant that, by the early 20th century, George Town boasted the best urban public transportation system within British Malaya. Steam-powered trams had been introduced in the city in 1887; the trams were then replaced by trolleybuses in the 1920s. The Penang Hill Railway, launched in 1923, remains operational to this day and is Penang's sole funicular railway system.

With improved access to education and rising living standards, George Town soon enjoyed substantial press freedom and there was a greater degree of participation in municipal affairs by its Asian residents. Penang's representatives in the Straits Settlements Legislative Council gained a reputation for their assertive contestation of the policies made by the Singapore-based British authorities.

On top of that, George Town, perceived as being more intellectually receptive than Singapore, also became as a magnet for well known English authors, Asian intellectuals and reformists. For instance, the Chinese revolutionary leader, Sun Yat-sen, chose to move his Southeast Asian base from Singapore to George Town, where he continued his efforts to reorganise and raise funds for the Chinese revolutionary movement against the Qing dynasty. These efforts culminated in the 1910 Penang conference, which paved the way to the Wuchang uprising that successfully overthrew the Manchu imperial government of China.

== World wars ==
=== World War I ===
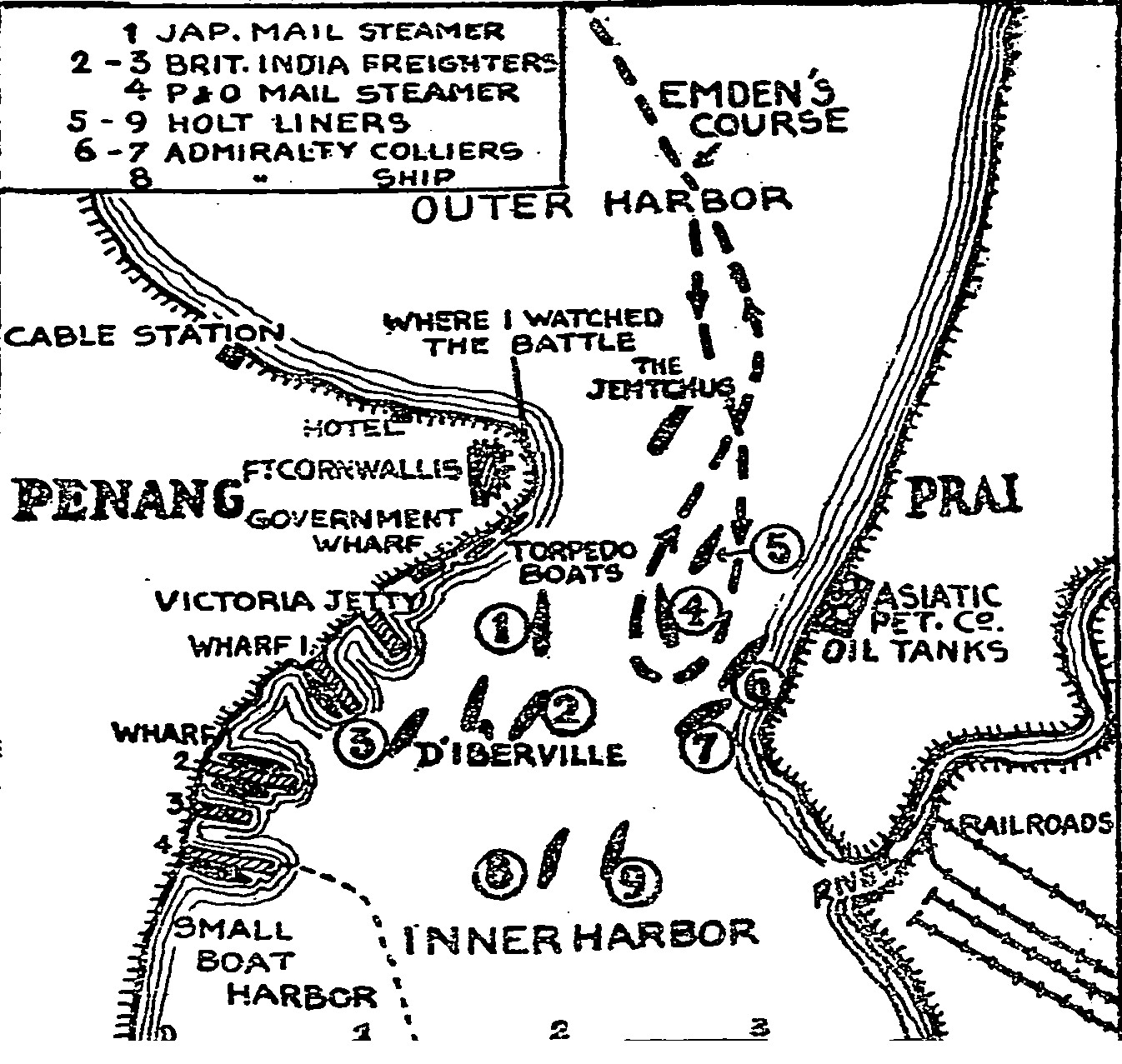
A 1914 map from the New York Times depicting the Battle of Penang.

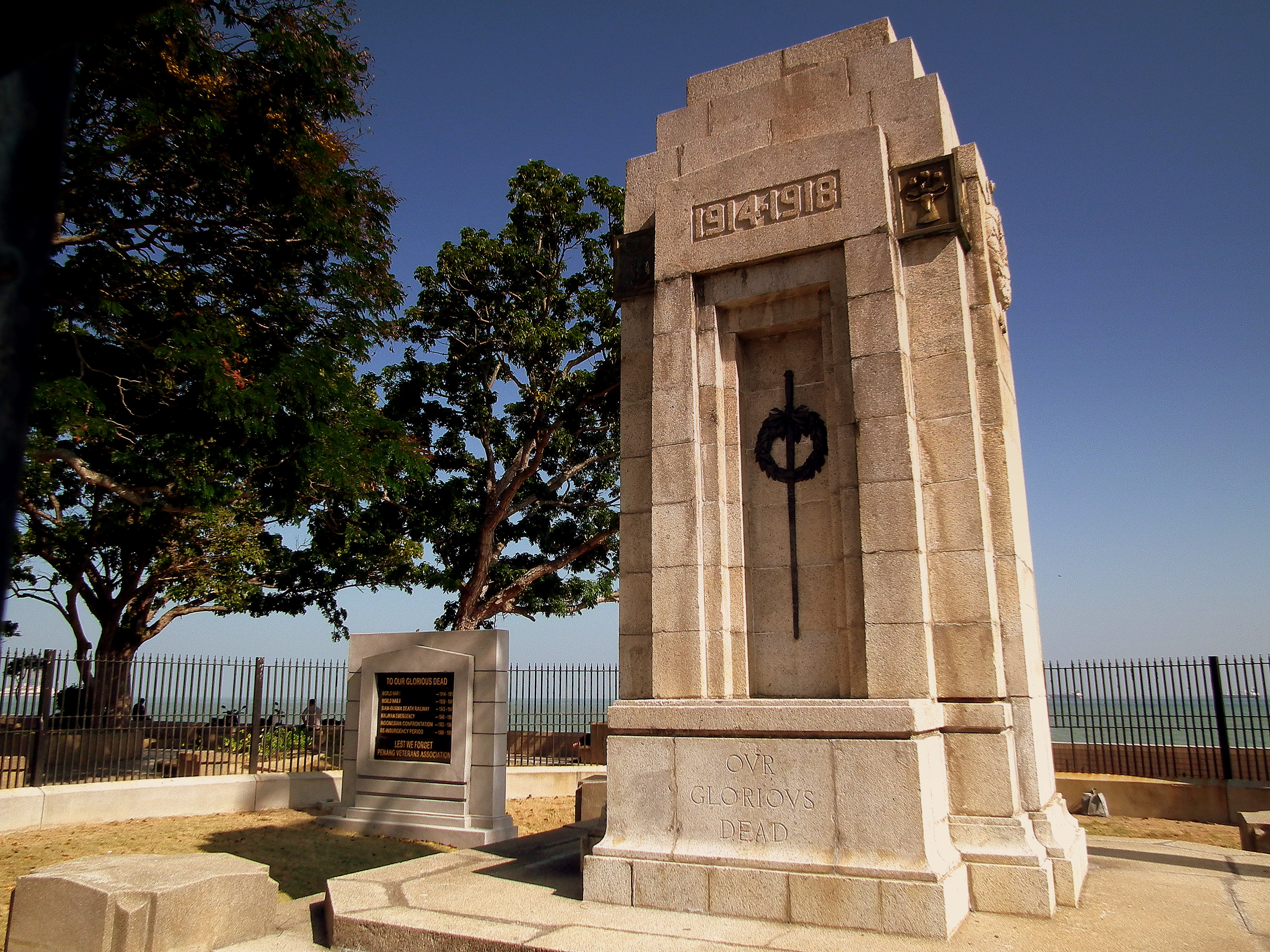
The Cenotaph in George Town was built in honour of fallen Allied servicemen of World War I.

On 28 October 1914, the Battle of Penang broke out, during which an Imperial German Navy cruiser, SMS Emden, covertly sailed into George Town and sank the Imperial Russian Navy cruiser, Zhemchug. The French Navy destroyer, Mousquet, set off in pursuit, before being sunk by SMS Emden as well off the northwestern tip of Penang Island. 147 French and Russian sailors were killed, while the survivors were rescued by local Malay fishermen.

Aside from the naval battle, George Town was largely unaffected by the events of World War I. However, the city's German community suffered economic losses during the war, as the British administrators seized the assets of German-owned firms, forcing German merchants to relocate their businesses elsewhere.

=== World War II ===
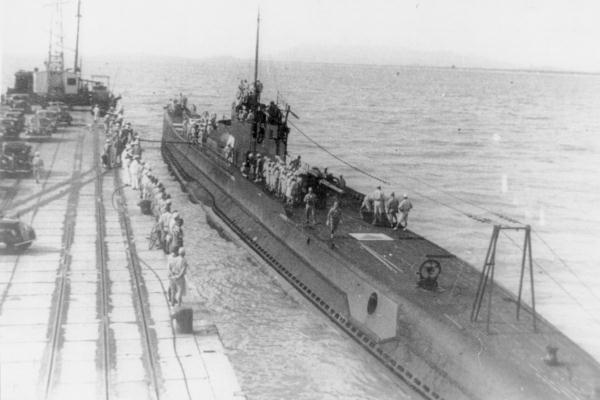
An Imperial Japanese Navy submarine at the Port of Penang in 1942.

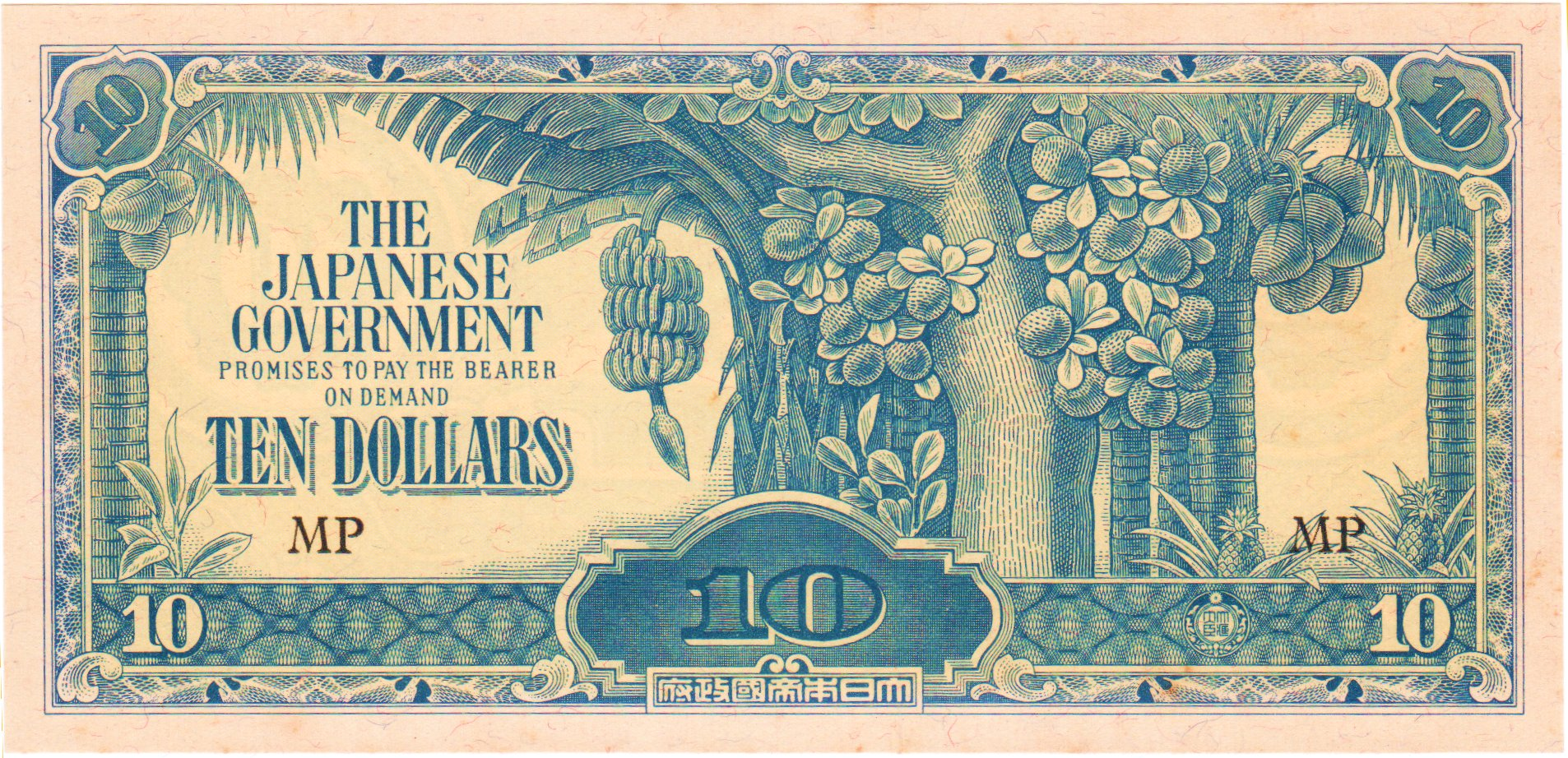
The Japanese-issued 'banana' dollar, so labelled due to the banana tree motif on notes such as this.

World War II, on the other hand, unleashed unprecedented social and political upheaval to George Town. From 9 until 18 December 1941, Japanese warplanes indiscriminately strafed and bombed the city, in the process eliminating the obsolete Royal Air Force and Royal Australian Air Force squadrons tasked with the defence of Penang. It was estimated that 600 civilians perished as a result of the Japanese bombardment, with an additional 1,100 wounded.

Notwithstanding the fact that the British Army had earlier designated Penang Island as a fortress, Lieutenant-General Arthur Percival subsequently ordered a withdrawal from Penang. Not only did the British Army abandon the Batu Maung Fort without firing a single shot, they also surreptitiously evacuated the city's European residents, leaving ethnic Asians to the mercy of the impending Japanese occupation. To this day, it has been agreed that the withdrawal and the covert evacuation of Europeans contributed to the loss of the British sense of invincibility, and that "the moral collapse of British rule in Southeast Asia came not in Singapore, but in Penang".

George Town fell to the Imperial Japanese Army on 19 December 1941, marking the start of a period of Japanese occupation. Penang Island was renamed Tojo-to, after the then Japanese prime minister Hideki Tojo. The Japanese enacted differing policies with each ethnic community. Ethnic Chinese residents arguably suffered the most brutal treatment, as the Imperial Japanese Army massacred thousands of Chinese as part of the Sook Ching campaign to rid anti-Japanese elements in the society. Female residents were also coerced to work as comfort women by the Imperial Japanese Army, with a handful of brothels set up within the city.

The city's residents also had to contend with economic hardship during the Japanese occupation, with hyperinflation caused by the oversupply of the Japanese-issued 'banana' dollars, and the acute shortage of food and raw materials, due to a combination of Japanese wartime rationing and an Allied blockade of Japanese shipping. Households were forced to grow secondary crops such as sweet potatoes, yam and tapioca for their own subsistence. Beginning in 1942, a standardised Japanese curricula was enforced in schools throughout the city, with Japanese as the official language. In fact, social lifestyles were also greatly affected, as it became compulsory to bow to Japanese soldiers on guard duty and to sing the Japanese national anthem, whilst whole streets and shops were renamed in Japanese.

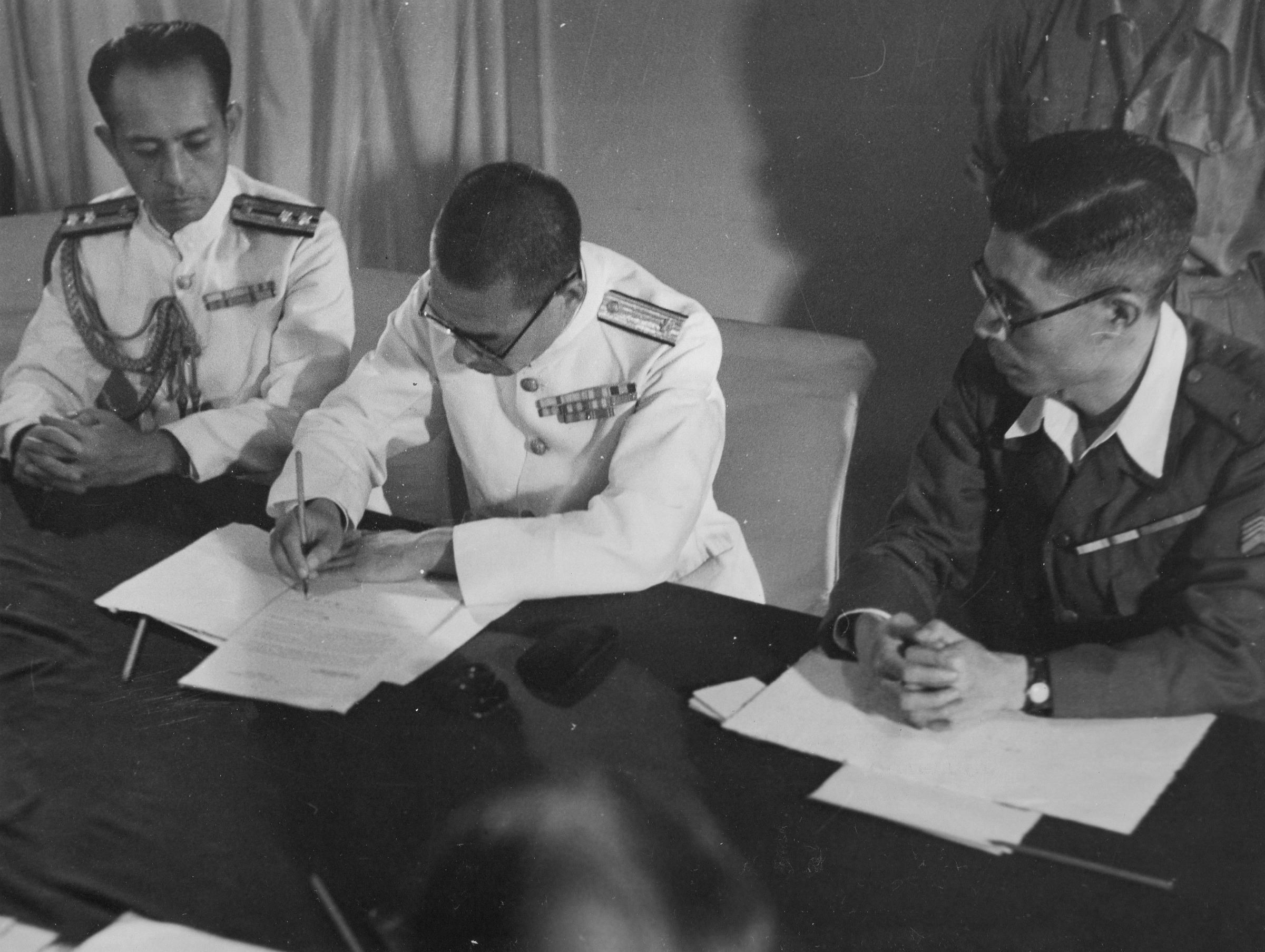
Japanese officials signing the surrender of Penang documents on board HMS Nelson on 2 September 1945.

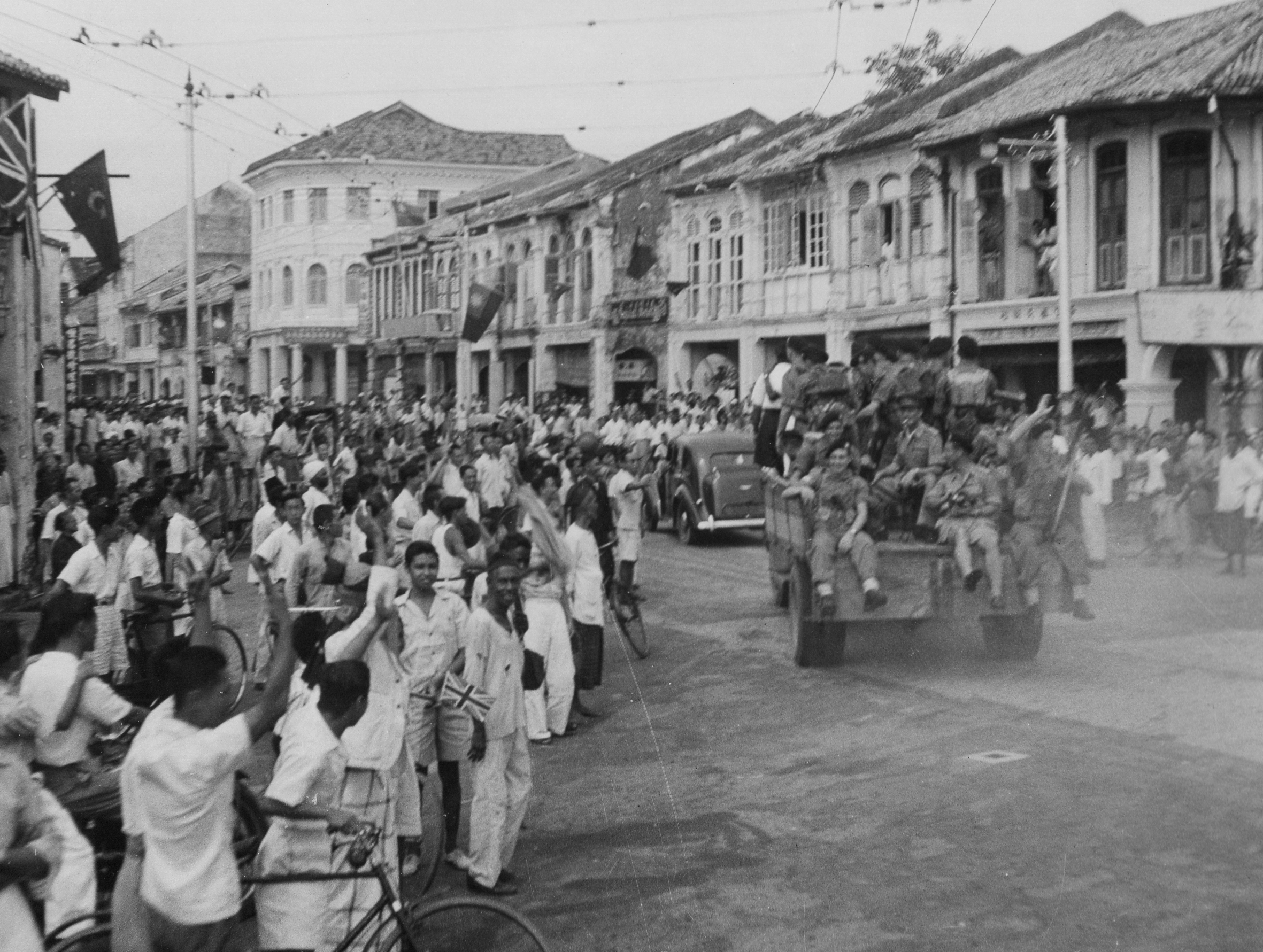
Royal Marines parading through a liberated George Town, 3 September 1945

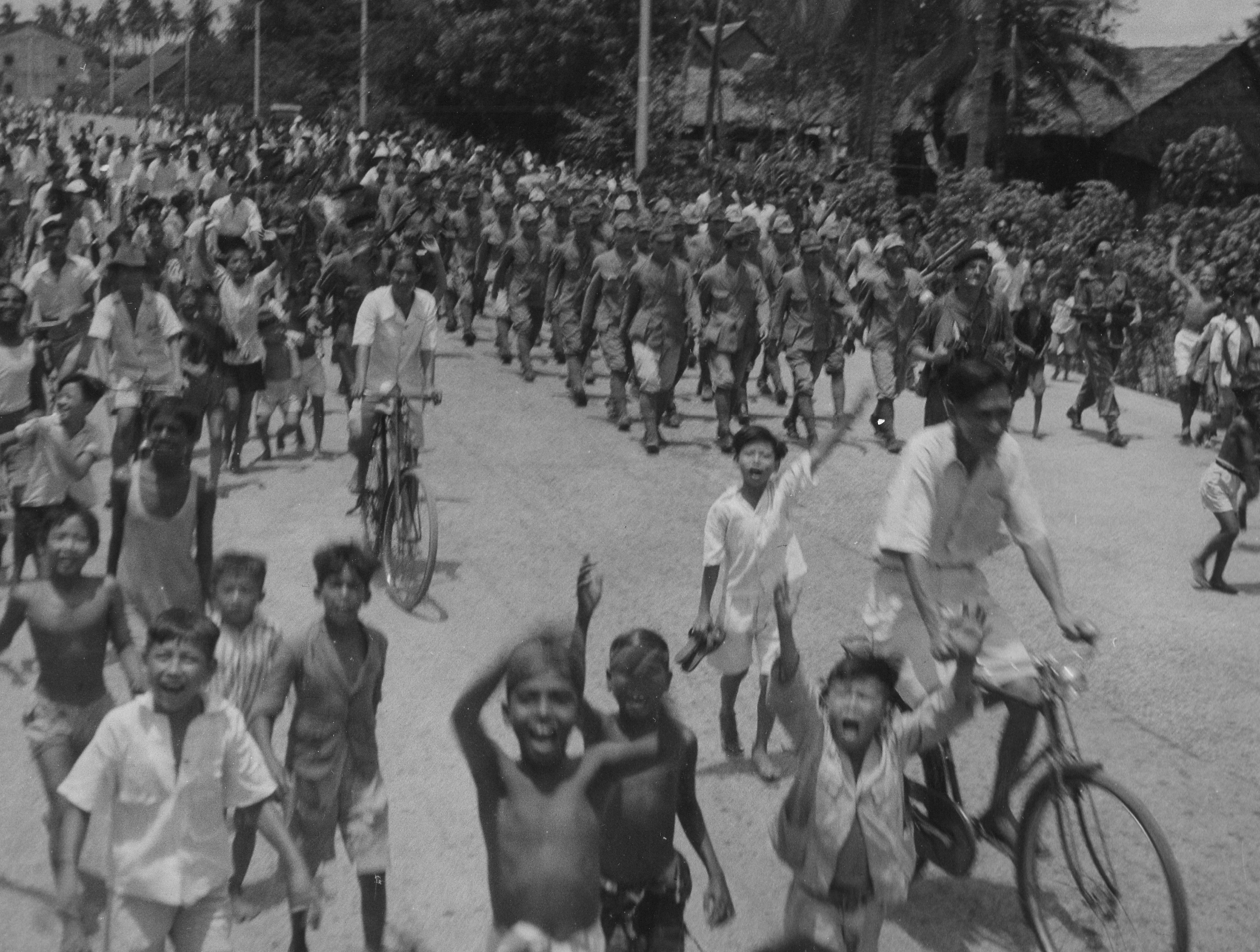
Japanese prisoners of war being marched through George Town, 3 September 1945

Meanwhile, the Port of Penang was utilised as a major Axis submarine base in Southeast Asia. Between 1942 and 1944, George Town became the port of call and a replenishment hub for the submarines of the Imperial Japanese Navy, the Kriegsmarine (of Nazi Germany) and the Regia Marina (of the Kingdom of Italy).

Between 1944 and 1945, Royal Air Force and United States Army Air Force bombers from India repeatedly launched bombing raids on George Town, seeking to destroy naval and administrative facilities. Several colonial buildings were destroyed or damaged, such as the Government Offices, St. Xavier's Institution, Hutchings School (now the Penang State Museum) and the Penang Secretariat Building. The destruction of the latter also wiped out a large part of British and Japanese records concerning Penang Island, complicating post-war efforts to compile a comprehensive history of Penang. The Penang Strait was also mined to deny its use to Japanese shipping.

Following the Japanese surrender on 15 August 1945, the Penang Shimbun, a Japanese daily, published the proclamation of surrender issued by the emperor of Japan. Under Operation Jurist, a British Royal Navy fleet, led by HMS Nelson, accepted the surrender of the Japanese garrison in Penang on 2 September 1945. A British Royal Marines contingent landed at Swettenham Pier on the following day and subsequently dispersed to capture key locations, including the Eastern & Oriental Hotel, Penang Hill and the military facilities in Gelugor. By the end of 3 September, George Town became the first city in Malaya to be liberated from Japanese rule.

== Post-war ==
Flag of the Crown Colony of Penang, which was in use between 1946 and 1949.

As with the rest of Penang, George Town was placed under a military administration until 1946, as the British sought to restore order in the face of an emerging communist insurgency.

On 1 April 1946, the British dissolved the Straits Settlements, with Sir Shenton Thomas being its last governor. The now separate crown colonies of Penang and Malacca were to be merged with the Federated Malay States and the Unfederated Malay States to form a new federation, the Malayan Union. Excluded from this union, the Crown Colony of Singapore was to remain firmly under British rule. The Malayan Union was subsequently replaced by the Federation of Malaya in 1948. As the gradual withdrawal of the Western colonial powers in Southeast Asia continued taking shape, the independence of Malaya as a united political entity seemed an inevitable conclusion.

However, George Town's residents were alarmed with the merger of the British crown colony of Penang into the vast Malay heartland. Questions were raised over economic and ethnic issues, such as the citizenship of non-Malays, the trade regulations imposed on Penang by the central government in Kuala Lumpur and the introduction of export duties for trade with the rest of Malaya. The underlying fear of George Town's residents was that the city's free port status would be eroded over time; although George Town was at that point the most developed urban area in Malaya, they also presciently anticipated that Penang's economy would become subordinated and peripheral to the overall schemes of the central government in Kuala Lumpur, with Penang's wealth being milked by the more backward states.

In response, the Penang Secessionist Committee, formed in 1948, was led by D.A. Mackay, then the chairman of the Penang Chamber of Commerce, and included the Penang Muslim Chamber of Commerce, the Penang Chinese Chamber of Commerce, the Penang Straits Chinese Association, the Penang Eurasian Association and the Penang Indian Chamber of Commerce. The committee proposed to exclude Penang from the Federation of Malaya, which would allow Penang to either retain its links with the British Empire or form a political union with Singapore.

Ultimately, the secessionists failed to achieve its goals and petered out. A secession motion tabled in the Penang Settlement Council in 1949 was narrowly voted down by British officials, while another petition sent to London in 1951 also met with British disapproval. While the secessionists' cause found sympathy with some British and American observers, the British administrators were reluctant to jeopardise their own plans to grant independence to a unified Malayan polity. The British government subsequently allayed the fears raised by the secessionists by guaranteeing George Town's free port status and by reintroducing municipal elections for the city in 1951.

For the municipal elections in 1951, George Town was divided into three wards - Tanjung, Kelawei and Jelutong. By 1956, the George Town Municipal Council became the first fully elected local government in Malaysia. Five wards were created to elect one councillor each year, while the president of the Municipal Council was voted from amongst the councillors.

=== Conferment of city status ===
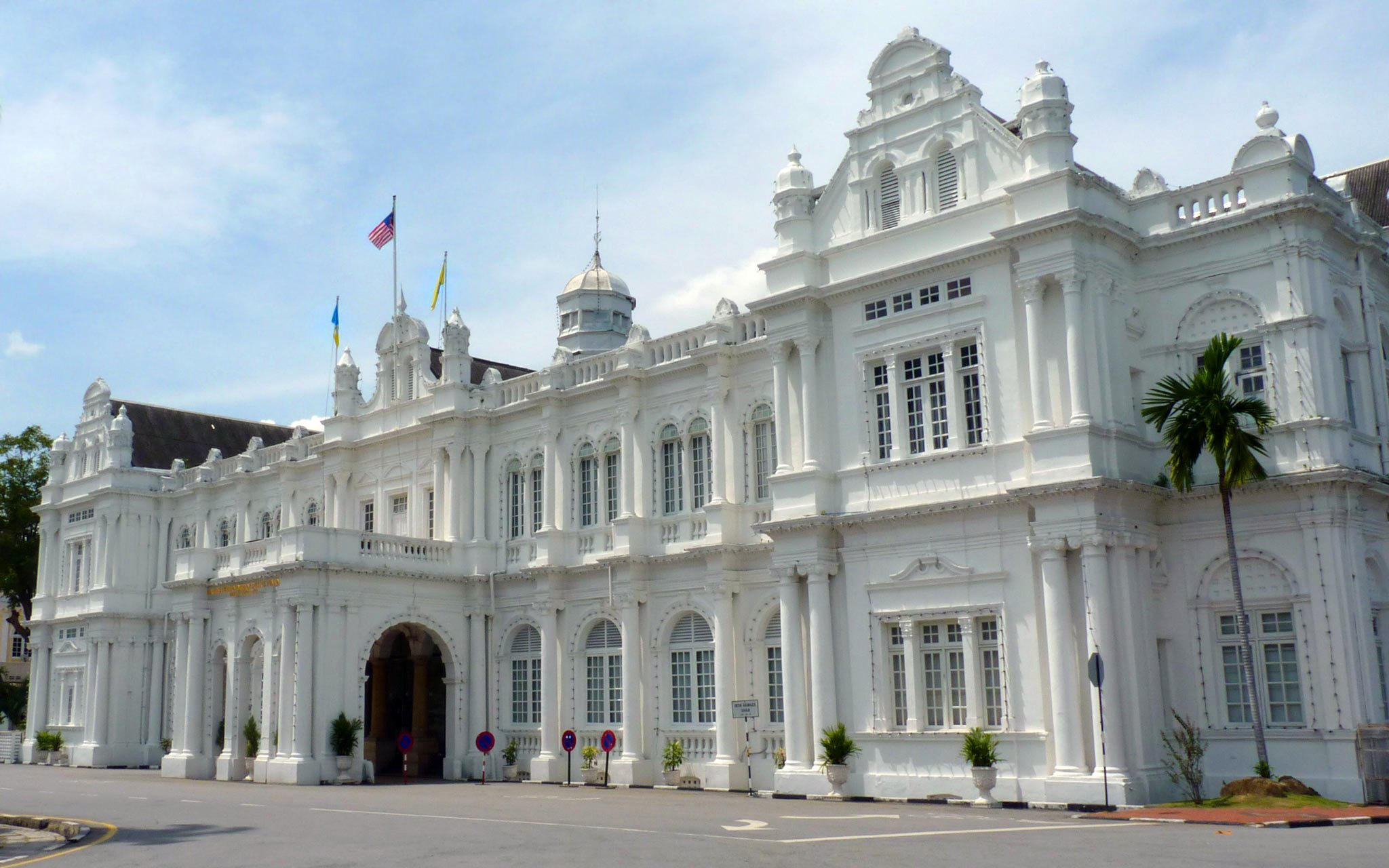
The City Hall, built in 1903, became the headquarters of the George Town City Council in 1957. Today, it still serves as the seat of the Penang Island City Council.

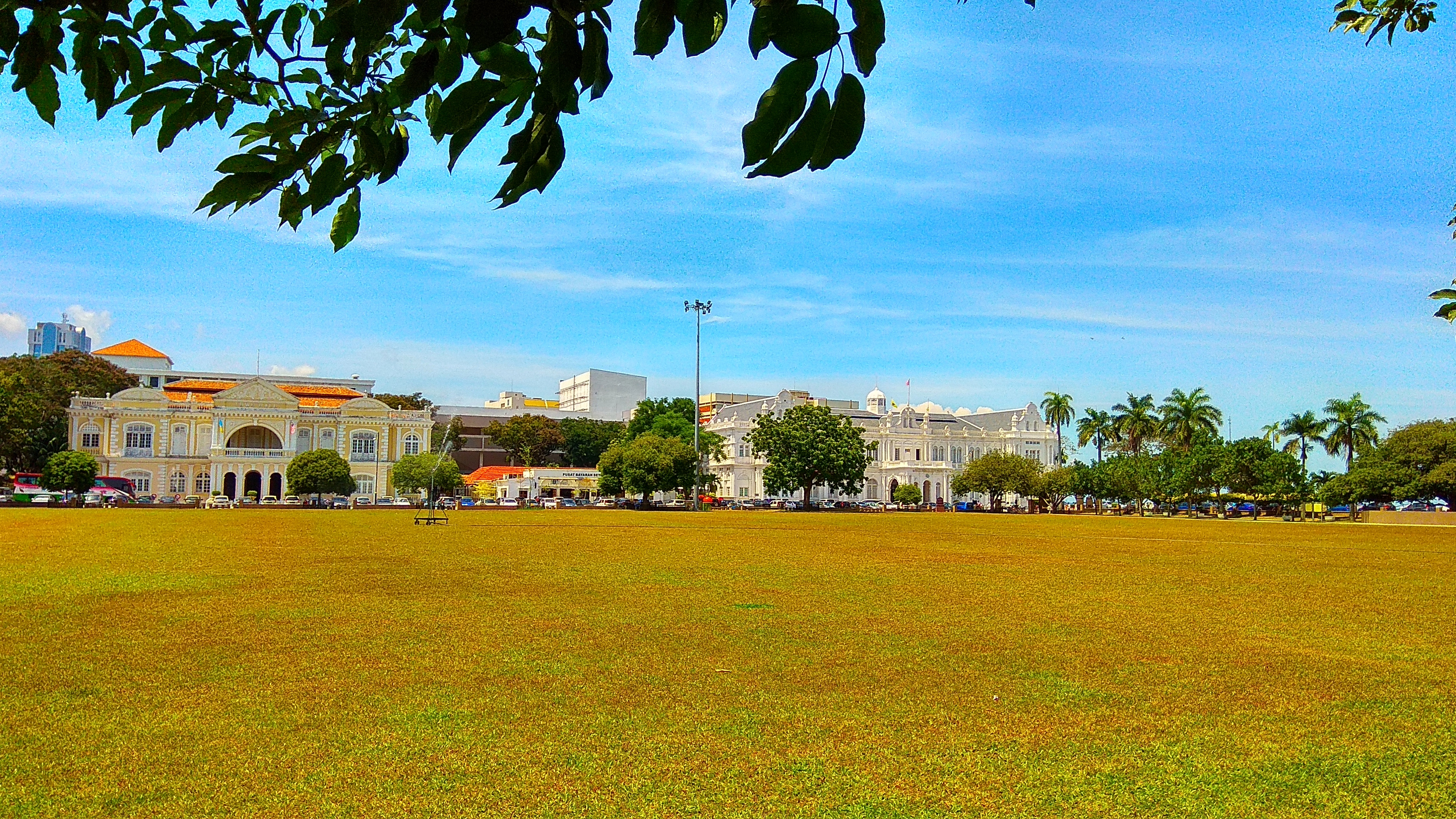
George Town's Esplanade, with the City Hall visible to the right. The proclamation of George Town's city status was made here on 1 January 1957.

On 1 January 1957, amid much fanfare, George Town was granted city status by Queen Elizabeth II in 1957, becoming the first city within the Federation of Malaya, and by extension, Malaysia. The royal charter from Queen Elizabeth II stated that

"... the said Municipality of George Town shall on the first day of January in the year of Our Lord One thousand nine hundred and fifty-seven and for ever thereafter be a city and shall be called and styled THE CITY OF GEORGE TOWN instead of the Municipality of George Town and shall thenceforth have all such rank, liberties, privileges and immunities as are incident to a City."

A simple proclamation ceremony was held in the morning at the city's Esplanade, attended by the then sultans of Perak and Pahang. The British high commissioner to Malaya at the time, Donald MacGillivray, paid tribute to Francis Light, who had founded George Town in 1786, and added that

"Penang Island, with its capital of George Town, was the seed-bed for the first planting of democracy and modern progress throughout Malaya... George Town with its fine motto of ‘Leading We Serve’, is still in the vanguard of progress, not only by being the first local government throughout this country to elect its own president and its own council, but also by being the first municipality in Malaya to be elevated to the status of city. Penang continues to lead."

The ceremony was followed by a week-long celebration marking the official elevation of George Town into a city - as well as the centenary of the local government and the New Year's Day - which lasted from 1 to 6 January, and included street festivities and a Chingay procession.

George Town continued to be the only city within Malaysia (other than Singapore between 1963 and its Separation in 1965) until 1972, when Kuala Lumpur also officially became a city.

Penang, as part of the Federation of Malaya, attained independence from the British Empire on 31 August 1957, and subsequently became a member state of Malaysia in 1963.

== Post-independence ==
=== 1957–1976 ===
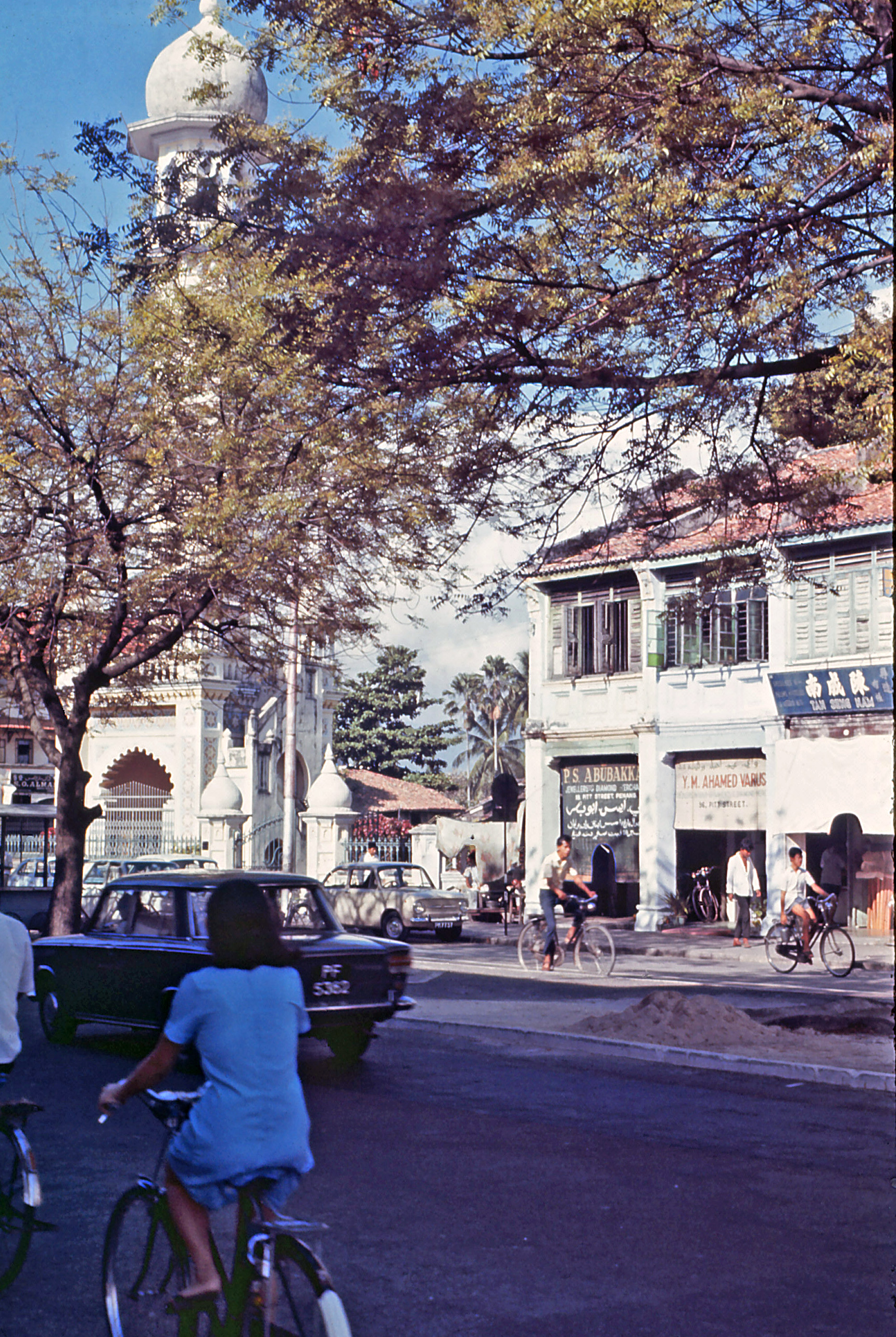
George Town in 1971.

Soon after Malaya attained independence from the British Empire, the left-wing Labour Party was elected into power in the George Town City Council, with D. S. Ramanathan becoming the first mayor of George Town. This reflected the lively political scenario within Penang in the post-independence era, as urban voters tended to elect the Labour Party to run the city council while leaving the state government in the hands of the ruling Alliance coalition, the latter of which also controlled the Malayan federal government.

Under the Labour Party, the city council implemented several social welfare policies. Low-cost housing were built, such as at Sungai Pinang and Cintra Street. Clinics and other healthcare facilities were opened for the urban poor, while a committee was formed for residents to air their grouses in any spoken language, even though English was the official language within the city council. The party also formulated the policy of electing a deputy mayor of a different ethnicity from that of the mayor's. The councillors were even encouraged to wear white, a measure that preceded Singapore's People's Action Party by a few years.

Ramanathan was succeeded as the mayor by Ooi Thiam Siew, who in turn was followed by Chooi Yew Choy. By 1965, the George Town City Council was the richest local government in Malaysia, with an annual revenue that was double that of the Penang state government. This solidified the financial autonomy of the city council, which was frequently at loggerheads against both the state government and the Malaysian federal government over differences in development priorities and budget allocations.

However, the acidic relationship between the city council and the Malaysian federal government would soon lead to the former's dissolution. In 1965, as the Indonesian Confrontation raged on, the federal government suspended municipal elections throughout the country. Allegations of maladministration and misconduct soon surfaced from within the George Town City Council. This led to the formation, by the federal government, of a Royal Commission of Enquiry, led by a senator, Athi Nahappan. While the Royal Commission was underway, the George Town City Council was concurrently suspended and its functions were transferred temporarily to the then chief minister of Penang, Wong Pow Nee.

The findings from the Royal Commission, released in the form of the Athi Nahappan Report, cleared the George Town City Council of any allegations of corruption and recommended the resumption of the city council, as well as municipal elections in the country. Nonetheless, in 1971, the Penang state government, by then dominated by the Gerakan party and under the leadership of Lim Chong Eu as the chief minister, decided to continue the suspension of Penang's local governments indefinitely.

Meanwhile, as previously guaranteed by the British authorities, George Town's free port status was untouched in the years immediately after the Malayan independence. The earlier fears by the secessionists eventually materialised, however, when in 1969, the free port status was suddenly revoked by the Malaysian federal government. As the Port of Penang's trade volume plummeted, 16.4% of Penang's working population became unemployed, adversely affecting George Town's services sector. In 1974, the Port of Penang was finally relocated from George Town to Seberang Perai, across the Penang Strait, to accommodate larger cargo and container vessels; to this day, only the city's Swettenham Pier remains operational as a terminal for cruise shipping. These events marked the death of the George Town's maritime trade and heralded the start of the city's slow, decades-long decline, which was reversed only in recent years.

By the 1970s, George Town's decline became more chronic due to a combination of external and internal factors. Throughout the 1970s and 80s, the Malaysian federal government intensified the development of Kuala Lumpur and nearby Port Klang, directing investments in communication, transport, education and health towards the Klang Valley region. Kuala Lumpur soon outstripped George Town as Malaysia's largest city and financial centre, while Port Klang rapidly became the country's busiest seaport. Consequently, George Town began to suffer substantial brain drain as the city's younger residents started emigrating for better employment opportunities. Concurrently, the opening of the Bayan Lepas Free Industrial Zone, to the south of George Town, also led to the hollowing out of the city centre; the city's population began to spread southwards, creating new suburban areas like Bayan Baru and Farlim. These led to implications on George Town's social fabric as well; for instance, the Catholic churches in the city were forced to merge their congregations into a single City Parish due to the shrinking of the city's Christian population.

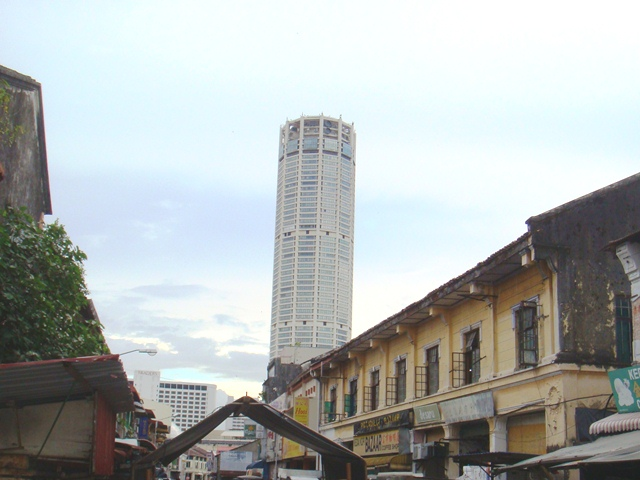
Constructed in 1974, the Komtar Tower within the city centre is Penang's tallest skyscraper.

In 1974, Lim launched the massive Komtar redevelopment project in the heart of George Town, aiming to revive the city's declining fortunes. The project included the 250 m (820 ft)-tall Komtar Tower, which remains Penang's tallest skyscraper to this day. Controversially, hundreds of shophouses, schools and temples, as well as entire streets such as Gladstone Road and Hong Kong Street, were bulldozed to make way for the project. However, instead of arresting the city's decline, Komtar itself became a white elephant by the early 2000s.

==== Controversy over city status ====
Between 1974 and 1976, the two local governments on Penang Island, the George Town City Council and the Penang Island Rural District Council, were merged to form the Penang Island Municipal Council. The merger of the local governments was finalised by the Local Government Act 1976, which also provided for non-elected local governments. Consequently, since then, Penang's local governments have been under the control of the Penang state government.

The merger also sparked a decades-long debate over George Town's city status. Ever since the merger, the Malaysian federal government maintained that, as the legal entity (local government) for George Town had now been superseded, George Town no longer existed as a city. The city of George Town was no longer mentioned in federal government publications and maps.

However, most Penangites contend to this day that George Town is still a city, as its city status has never been officially or legally revoked. Several federal and municipal ordinances and by-laws in use today still refer to the City of George Town, such as the City of George Town Ordinance 1957 and the City of George Town Liquefied Petroleum Gases By-Laws 1971. According to Penang Heritage Trust (PHT) trustee and lawyer, Anwar Fazal, George Town "legally has been and is still a city because the City of George Town Ordinance 1957 was never repealed".

In addition, Clause 3 of the Local Government (Merger of the City Council of George Town and the Rural District Council of Penang Island) Order 1974, which was sanctioned by the then Penang state government, stated that

"... the status of the City of George Town as a city shall continue to be preserved and maintained and shall remain unimpaired by the merger hereby effected."

The clause above implies that, although the legal entity for George Town had been superseded, George Town's city status remains intact and unchanged by the merger of the local governments.

=== 1977–2008 ===
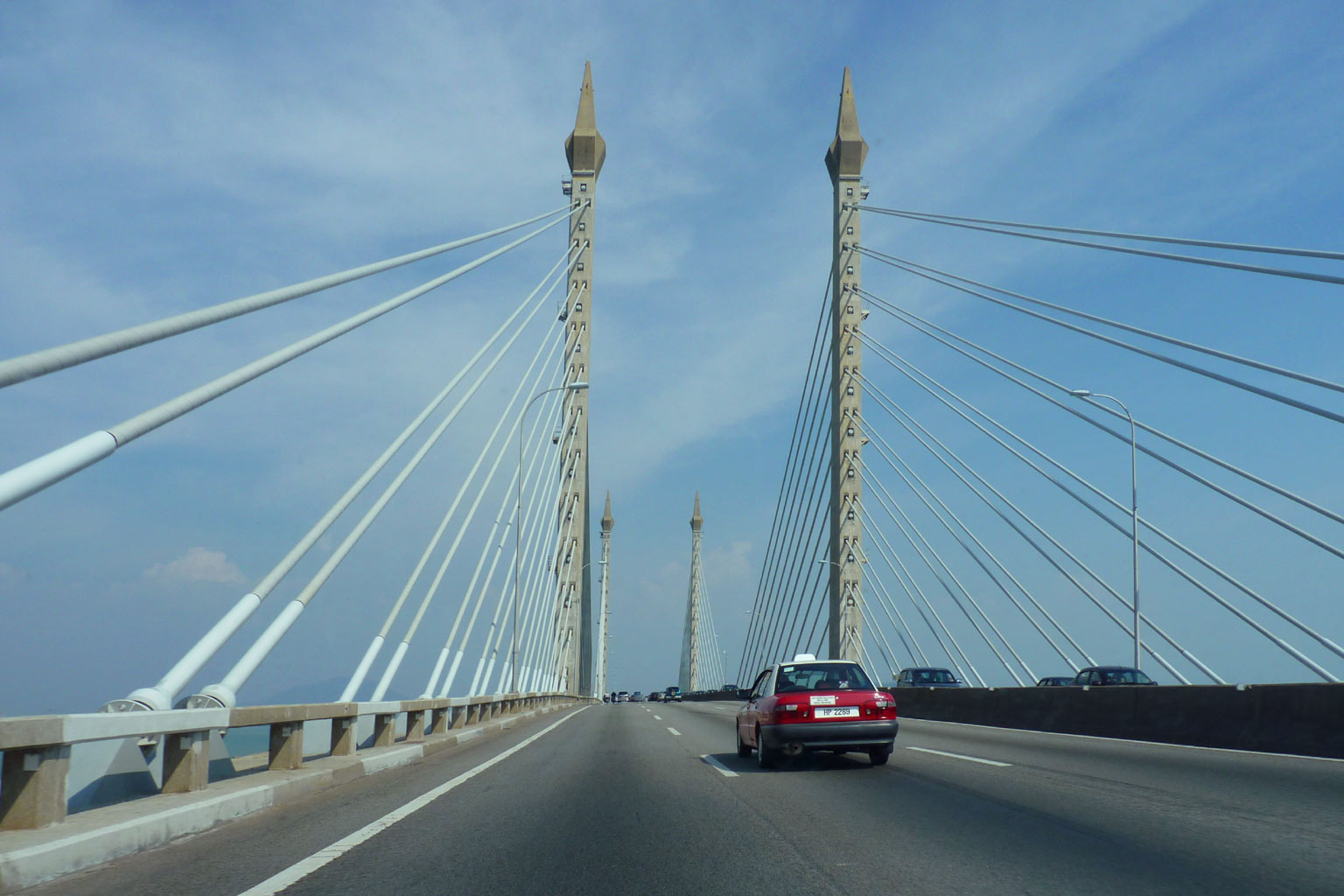
Completed in 1985, the Penang Bridge was then the longest bridge in Southeast Asia.

In 1985, the Penang Bridge, then the longest bridge in Southeast Asia, was opened for traffic. The 13.5 km (8.4 mi) bridge spans the Penang Strait between George Town's southernmost suburb of Gelugor and Perai in Seberang Perai, making it the first road link between Penang Island and the Malay Peninsula.

In the 1990s, as George Town's banks began reassessing their spatial requirements to accommodate larger business volumes, a number of commercial developments were launched along the city's Northam Road. The commercial skyscrapers along this coastal road quickly attracted various banking, auditing and other financial services, as the newer buildings offer greater office space and more advanced amenities that the colonial-era buildings at Beach Street lacked.

Also in the early 1990s, the Penang state government, then led by Koh Tsu Koon as the chief minister of Penang, drew up plans for the development of Penang Hill near the city. This drew considerable backlash from Penang's civil societies, concerned about the potential environmental degradation of the forested hill. The plan was ultimately scrapped.

At the turn of the century, the city's non-governmental organisations (NGOs) turned their attention to the city centre itself, where the Rent Control Act was being repealed. In the preceding decades, the Act had protected the city's low-income residents from eviction by preventing property tenants from increasing rentals arbitrarily. When it was nullified in 2001, property rentals soared rapidly. Residents and smaller businesses, unable to cope with the rental hikes, moved out of the city centre, further contributing to the hollowing out of the city centre. Unscrupulous private developers took advantage of the situation and demolished several pre-war heritage buildings within the city centre for redevelopment, while other historic buildings fell under neglect. In response, NGOs based within the city, such as the Penang Heritage Trust, began to mobilise public support and form strategic partnerships for the conservation of these historic buildings.

By then, the decades of brain drain also took its toll within George Town. For instance, while Kuala Lumpur was granted several mega-projects, including the Petronas Towers and the Kuala Lumpur International Airport, George Town suffered a shortage of qualified engineers and architects, as professionals continued gravitating towards the Greater Kuala Lumpur area. In the case of the new commercial properties along Northam Road, cheap unskilled labour from the poorer countries in the region, such as Bangladeshis and Nepalis, filled the void left by the quality subcontractors who had moved to Kuala Lumpur. Moreover, the lack of a coherent urban planning policy and inadequate traffic management meant that little was done to curb the worsening traffic congestion within the city. Even George Town's reputation for cleanliness was not spared, as reports of coastal pollution and dirty streets within the city made headline news. As early as 1996, the then Malaysian prime minister, Mahathir Mohamad, had even called Penang a "garbage state".

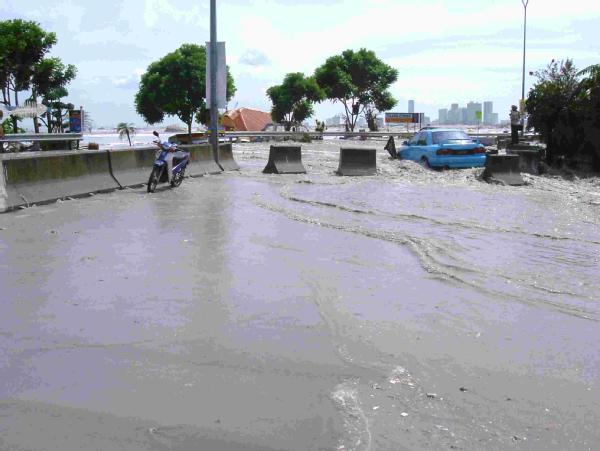
Tanjung Tokong, a suburb of George Town, was among the worst hit areas during the Indian Ocean tsunami on 26 December 2004.

These, combined with Penang's slowing economy, led to widespread resentment over the decline and neglect of George Town, and by extension, Penang. In 2004, a media campaign was initiated by Malaysia's press to restore the city to its former glory. The dissatisfaction over the decline of the city formerly known as the "Pearl of the Orient", combined with Penang's relatively lively political scene, contributed to the defeat of the incumbent Barisan Nasional (the current ruling coalition the Malaysian federal government) in the 2008 State Election by the federal opposition pact, Pakatan Rakyat. As a result, Pakatan Rakyat, led by the DAP, was voted into power within Penang, with Lim Guan Eng succeeding Koh as the chief minister.

In late 2004, George Town was hit by the massive Indian Ocean tsunami. The city's northern coast, such as Batu Ferringhi and Gurney Drive, were among the worst hit places within Penang. The tsunami claimed 52 lives in Penang, out of the 68 deaths in Malaysia. Since then, a network of sirens has been installed throughout George Town as part of a national tsunami warning system designed to alert the public of such calamities in the future.

=== 2008–present ===
#	Mayor of Penang Island	In office
1	Patahiyah Ismail	2015–2017
2	Maimunah Mohd Sharif	2017–2018
3	Yew Tung Seang	2018–present

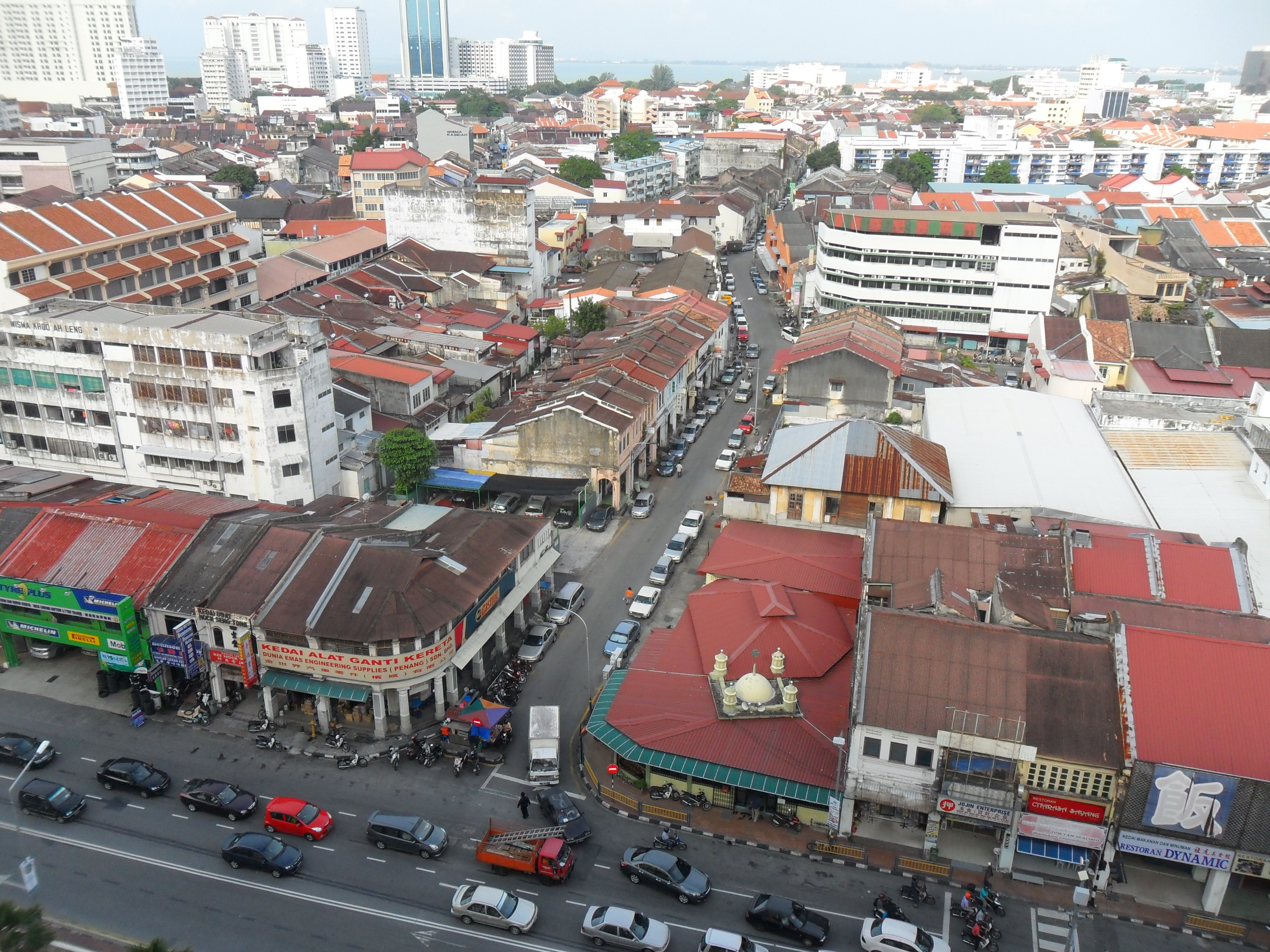
A large portion of the city centre has been gazetted as a UNESCO World Heritage Site since 2008.

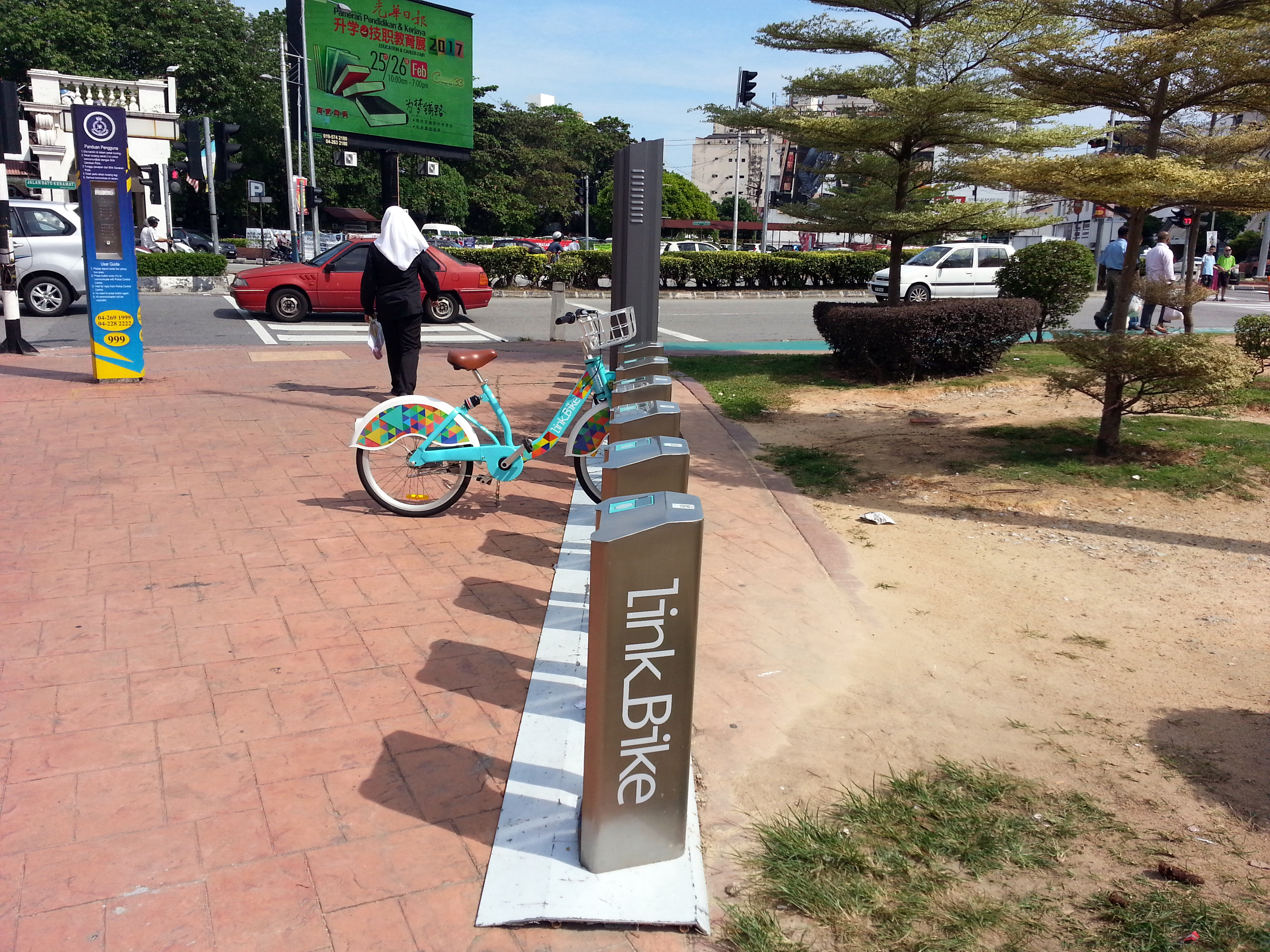
A LinkBike station in George Town. This public-bicycle sharing service is an initiative of the Penang state government to alleviate traffic congestion in the city.

In 2008, a large part of the George Town city centre, along with Malacca, was inscribed as a UNESCO World Heritage Site. Nearly 260 hectares (640 acres) of the city centre now comes under UNESCO protection, which controls and prohibits infrastructural changes within the zone to maintain the integrity of the city's historical core.

Concurrently, the new Penang state government, under Pakatan Rakyat (now Pakatan Harapan), implemented various policy changes to improve George Town's liveability and cleanliness, as well as boosting the city's economic competitiveness. Efforts to improve hygiene and pedestrianisation, as well as the use of public transportation, the promotion of the city's cultural diversity and improvements in traffic flow, were implemented. By 2010, George Town was ranked the eighth most liveable city in Asia by ECA International, the highest ranking attained by a Malaysian city. In 2017, the city was also rated the second cleanest within Malaysia, after Ipoh.

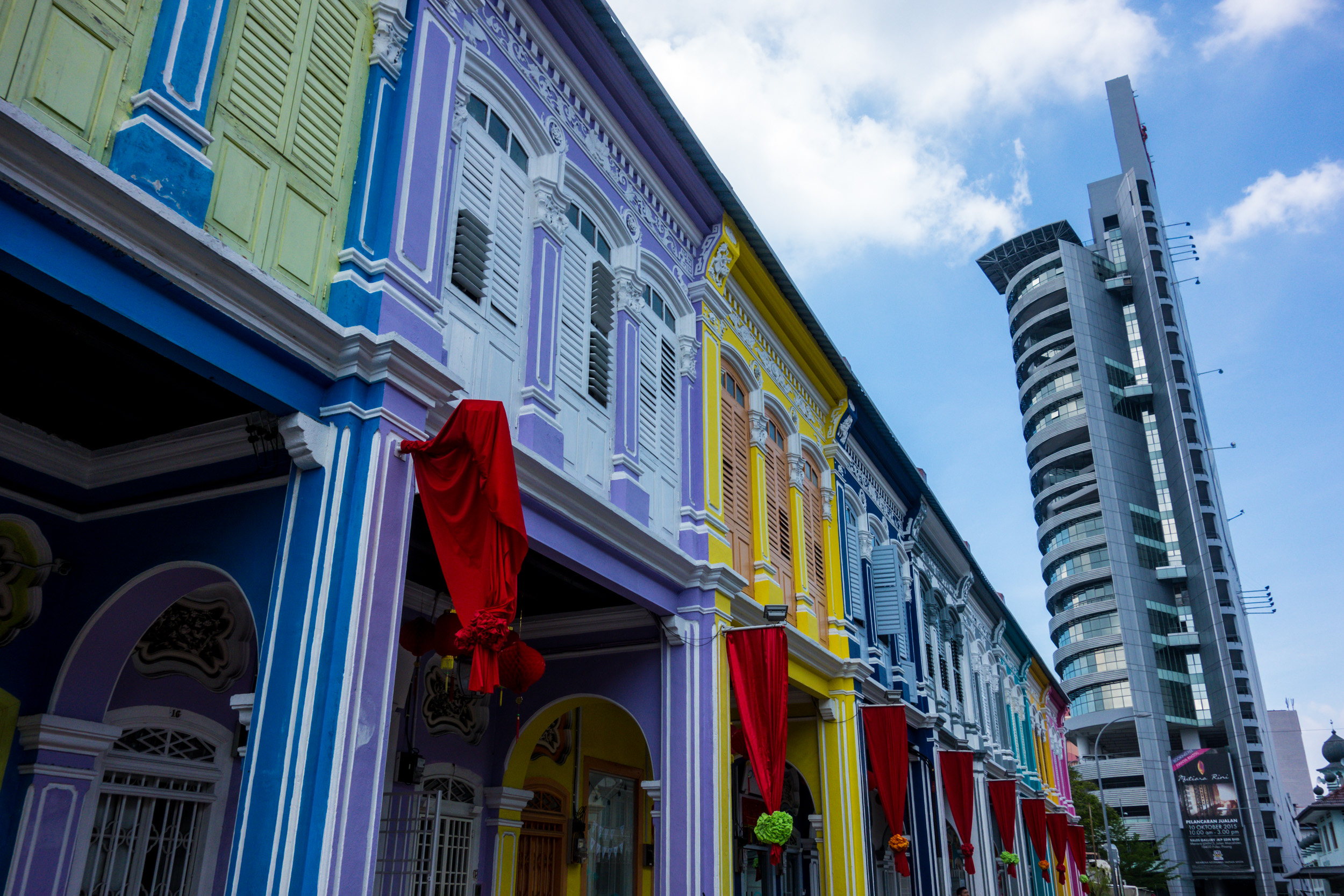
A row of renovated Peranakan shophouses in George Town. In recent years, colonial-era heritage properties have become popular amongst expatriates seeking to establish businesses.

Moreover, George Town, as the economic and financial centre of northern Malaysia, is now home to a vibrant services sector, augmented by its booming tourism, retail and startup industries, while a growing number of expatriates and returning Penangite émigrés have repurposed the city's heritage properties for business enterprises. In 2016, George Town was ranked the most attractive destination for commercial property investment within Malaysia by Knight Frank, surpassing even Kuala Lumpur.

In 2015, the Malaysian federal government elevated the Penang Island Municipal Council into the present-day Penang Island City Council; in effect, the jurisdiction of the city of George Town was expanded to cover the entirety of Penang Island, as well as five of the surrounding islets. This also makes George Town the only Malaysian city to have been conferred city status twice. Patahiyah Ismail became the first mayor of Penang Island, as well as the first female mayor in Penang's history.

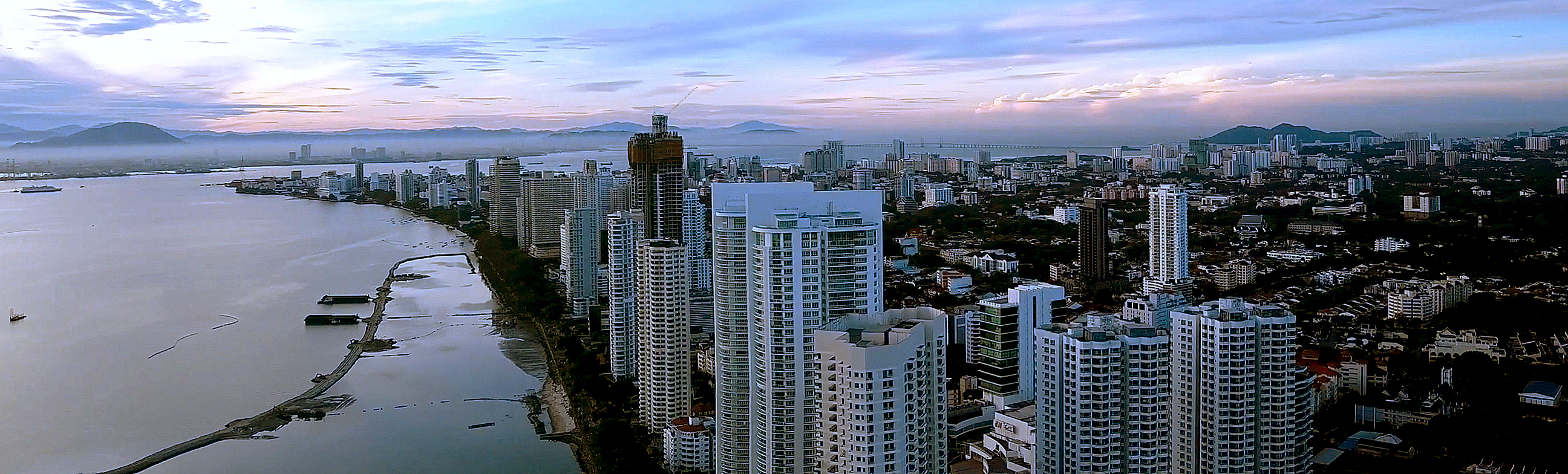
Skyline of George Town as of 2017, as seen from Gurney Drive.

== See also ==
- Penang Island City Council
- History of Penang
- Straits Settlements
