= City Parish =

City Parish, Penang
- Location: George Town, Penang
- Country: Malaysia
- Denomination: Roman Catholic
- Website: http://cityppg.wordpress.com/

History
- Founded: 1988

Administration
- Division: Penang Island Deanery
- Diocese: Penang

Clergy
- Priest: Fr Edmund Woon

City Parish is a community of 4 churches in George Town, Penang. It was founded in 1988 with the merging of the four Catholic churches in the city.

== History ==
In the 1970s, new housing estates were opened around the city. People started moving out of George Town and the number of Catholics staying in the city had decreased greatly. From a number of 10,000 Catholics, it had shrunk to 900 Catholics in the 1990s. Also in view was the number of priests, which are also decreasing.

In 1988, the bishop of Penang, Antony Selvanayagam decided to merge the 4 churches located in George Town, namely Church of Our Lady of Sorrows, Church of the Assumption, Church of St. Francis Xavier and Church of St. John Britto into one parish named City Parish. The administration centre of the parish will be at Church of Our Lady of Sorrows at Macalister Road.

== Four churches ==
The four churches of City Parish are:

=== Church of Our Lady of Sorrows (OLS) ===
The parish was established in 1888 to accommodate the Chinese Catholics of Penang Island. The church grew further and in 1958, the current church, imposing a 107-foot-high belfry, was opened. Fr. Arthur Julien, was instrumental in building the Heng Ee Primary School (next to the church) and also Heng Ee High School. Silver Jubilee (58-83) celebration of the new church was celebrated. The centenary celebrations were held in 1988. Currently, this church houses the residence of the parish priest of City Parish and also the parish office.

=== Church of the Assumption (AC) ===
The church is the oldest church in Penang and was founded in 1786.

=== Church of St. Francis Xavier (SFX) ===
The Church of St. Francis Xavier was founded in 1857 in Penang Road for Tamil speaking Catholics. The first church was built ten years later. With the increasing number of parishioners, the present church was completed in 1952. Today, St. Francis Xavier's Church is a mass centre and also houses the St. Joseph's Orphanage, The Lighthouse (a centre for the poor), Lighthouse Bakery, the La Salle Learning Centre and also the Catholic Information Centre.

=== Church of St. John Britto (SJB) ===
The Church of St. John Britto was built in 1969 by Msgr IJ Aloysius. A community hall was constructed there in 1972. It is also a parish centre in City Parish.

== Organisation ==
The four churches of City Parish are currently administered by Reverend Father Edmund Woon as the Parish Priest.

== Mass Times ==
Daily Masses in OLS Church
6:00pm English (Thursday & Friday)

Daily Masses in SFX Church
12:30pm English (Mondays to Wednesdays)
8:00am English (Saturday)

Saturday Masses
Novena: 5:15pm English (OLS)
Sunset Mass: 6:00pm English (OLS)

Sunday Masses
8:00am Tamil (SJB)
8:30am English (OLS)
10:00am English (AC)
10:15am Mandarin (OLS)
11:45am Tagalog (OLS)
6:00pm English (SFX)

Holy Hour
1st Fridays: 6:30pm (OLS)

== See also ==
- Church of the Assumption (Penang)
- Roman Catholic Diocese of Penang
- Holy Spirit Cathedral, Penang
