= Pitt Street, George Town =

Road in the Malaysian state of Penang

Pitt Street
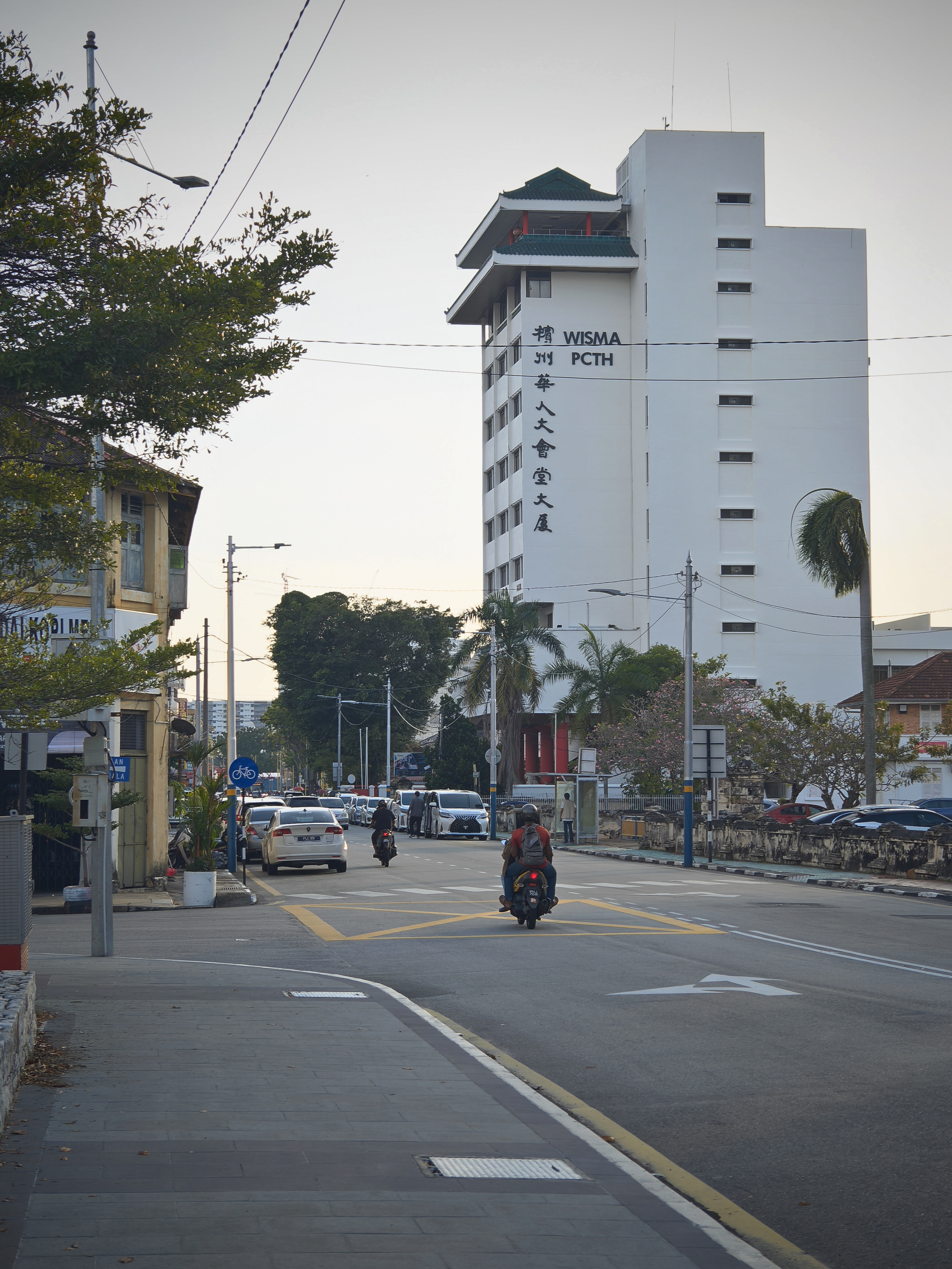
- Native name: Malay: Jalan Masjid Kapitan Keling; Chinese: 椰角街; Tamil: ஏலம் முச்சந்த்தி
- Maintained by: Penang Island City Council
- Location: George Town
- Coordinates: 5.418978°N 100.339242°E
- North end: Light Street
- South end: Armenian Street
- JALAN MASJID KAPITAN KELING Pitt St10200 P. PINANG

UNESCO World Heritage Site
- Type: Cultural
- Criteria: ii, iii, iv
- Designated: 2008 (32nd session)
- Part of: George Town UNESCO Core Zone
- Reference no.: 1223
- Region: Asia-Pacific

Pitt Street or Jalan Masjid Kapitan Keling in Malay is a major thoroughfare in the city of George Town within the Malaysian state of Penang. One of the oldest roads in the city centre, it was named after William Pitt the Younger, the Prime Minister of Great Britain in 1786.

Four places of worship, each of a different religion - Islam, Taoism, Hinduism and Christianity - are located within metres of one another along this street, earning it its nickname, the Street of Harmony. Located within the city's UNESCO World Heritage Site, the street's nickname also reflects the harmonious coexistence of various religions and cultures that have lived here for centuries.

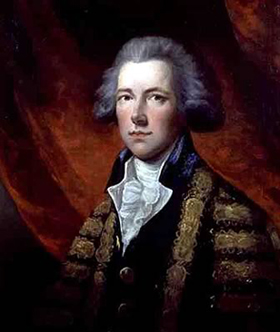
William Pitt the Younger was the British Prime Minister when Captain Francis Light founded Penang in 1786.

== Etymology ==
Pitt Street was named after William Pitt the Younger, who was the Prime Minister of Great Britain between 1783 and 1801.

When Captain Francis Light founded Penang Island in 1786, he renamed the island the Prince of Wales Island in honour of the Prince of Wales, the new settlement of George Town after King George III and the first street within the settlement after himself. Worried that Prime Minister William Pitt may have felt offended as nothing was named after him, Light felt compelled to name Pitt Street after him.

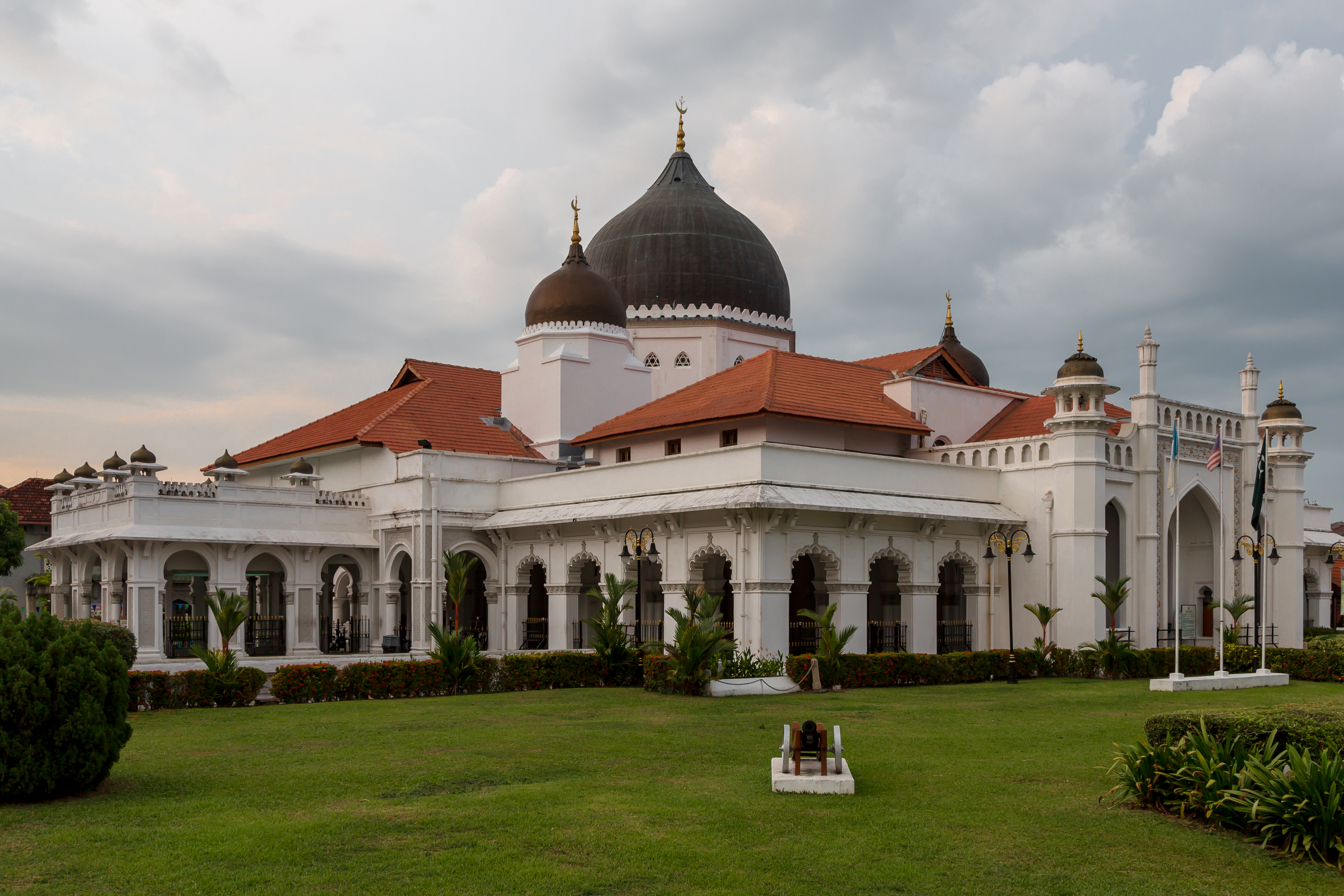
The Kapitan Keling Mosque is one of the oldest mosques in Penang.

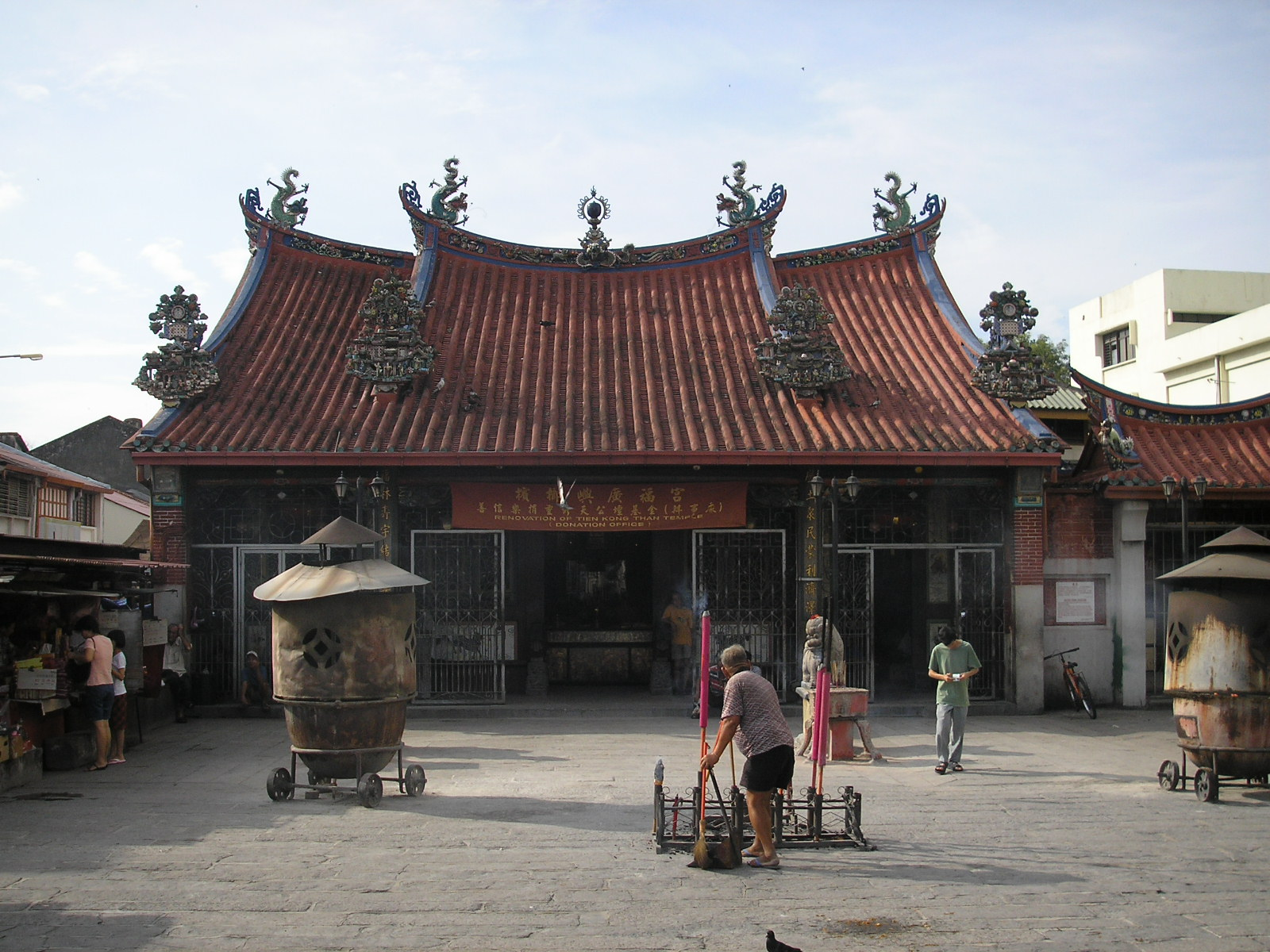
The Goddess of Mercy Temple is a Taoist temple dedicated to the Guanyin.

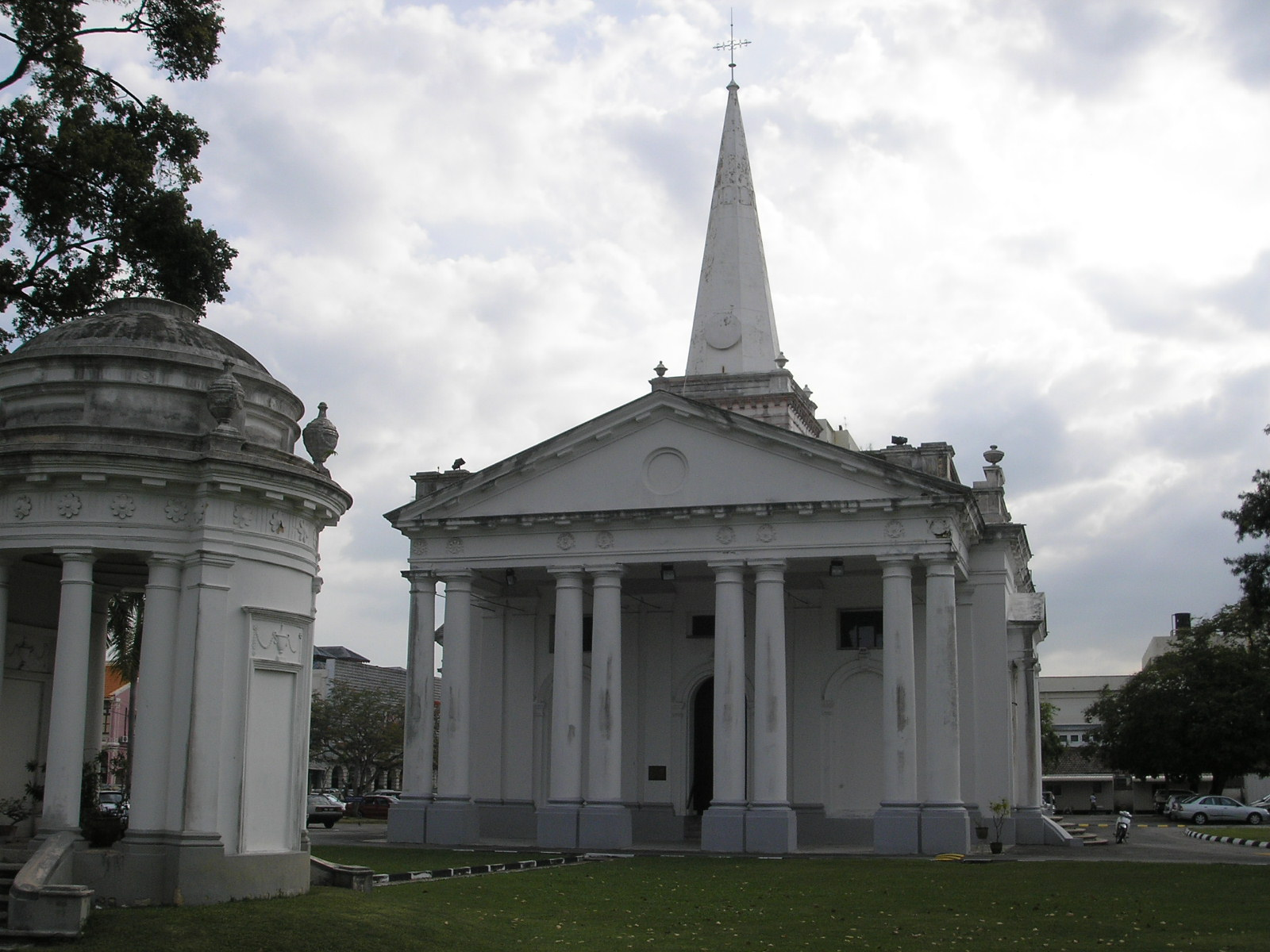
St. George's Church is the oldest Anglican church in Southeast Asia.

== History ==
Pitt Street, created soon after the founding of George Town in 1786, is one of the oldest streets in the city. It marked the original western boundary of the settlement of George Town and appeared in the earliest maps of the settlement.

While British administrators and Europeans resided at the northern end of Pitt Street, and built the St. George's Church in 1816, the Indian Muslim community moved into the southern part of Pitt Street. The Indian Muslim presence can still be seen to this day, particularly by the Kapitan Keling Mosque which was built in 1801.

Meanwhile, the Chinese built the Kong Hock Keong Temple, also known as the Goddess of Mercy Temple, in the early 18th century. The Hindus also constructed the Sri Mahamariamman Temple in 1833; the temple has since become a focal point of George Town's Little India.

The harmonious coexistence of the various religions and cultures along Pitt Street has earned the street its nickname, the Street of Harmony.

Even though the street has been officially renamed as Jalan Masjid Kapitan Keling since the 1990s, local Penangites continue to use the street's old colonial name, Pitt Street. This is partly because the new name sounds unwieldy, but also reflects a strong conservatism in the local population, who see Penang's colonial history as part of their local identity.

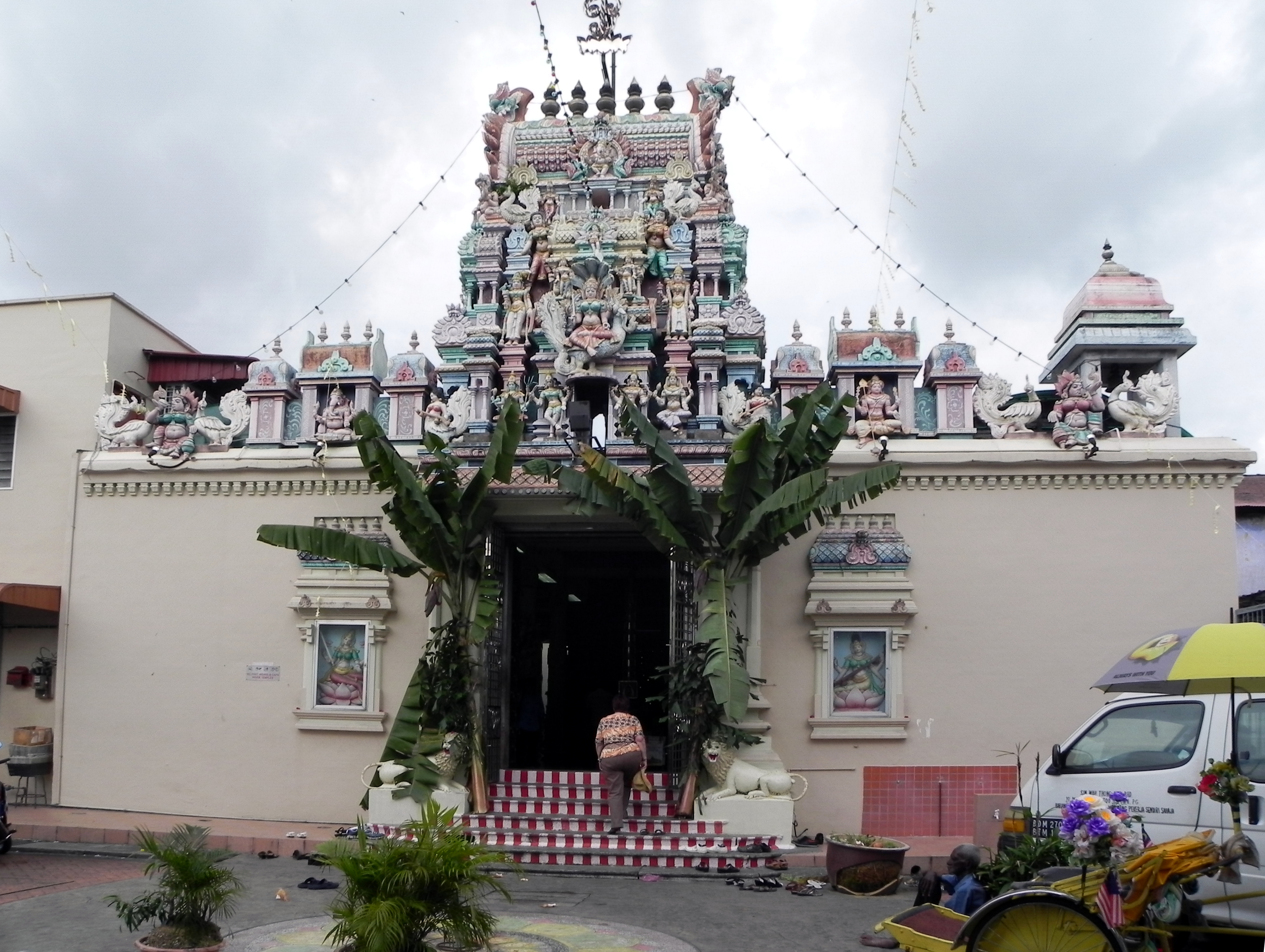
The Sri Mahamariamman Temple is the oldest Hindu temple in Penang.

== Landmarks ==
- Kapitan Keling Mosque
- St. George's Church
- Goddess of Mercy Temple
- Penang Chinese Town Hall
- Sri Mahamariamman Temple

== See also ==
- List of roads in George Town
- Architecture of Penang
