= Architecture of Penang =

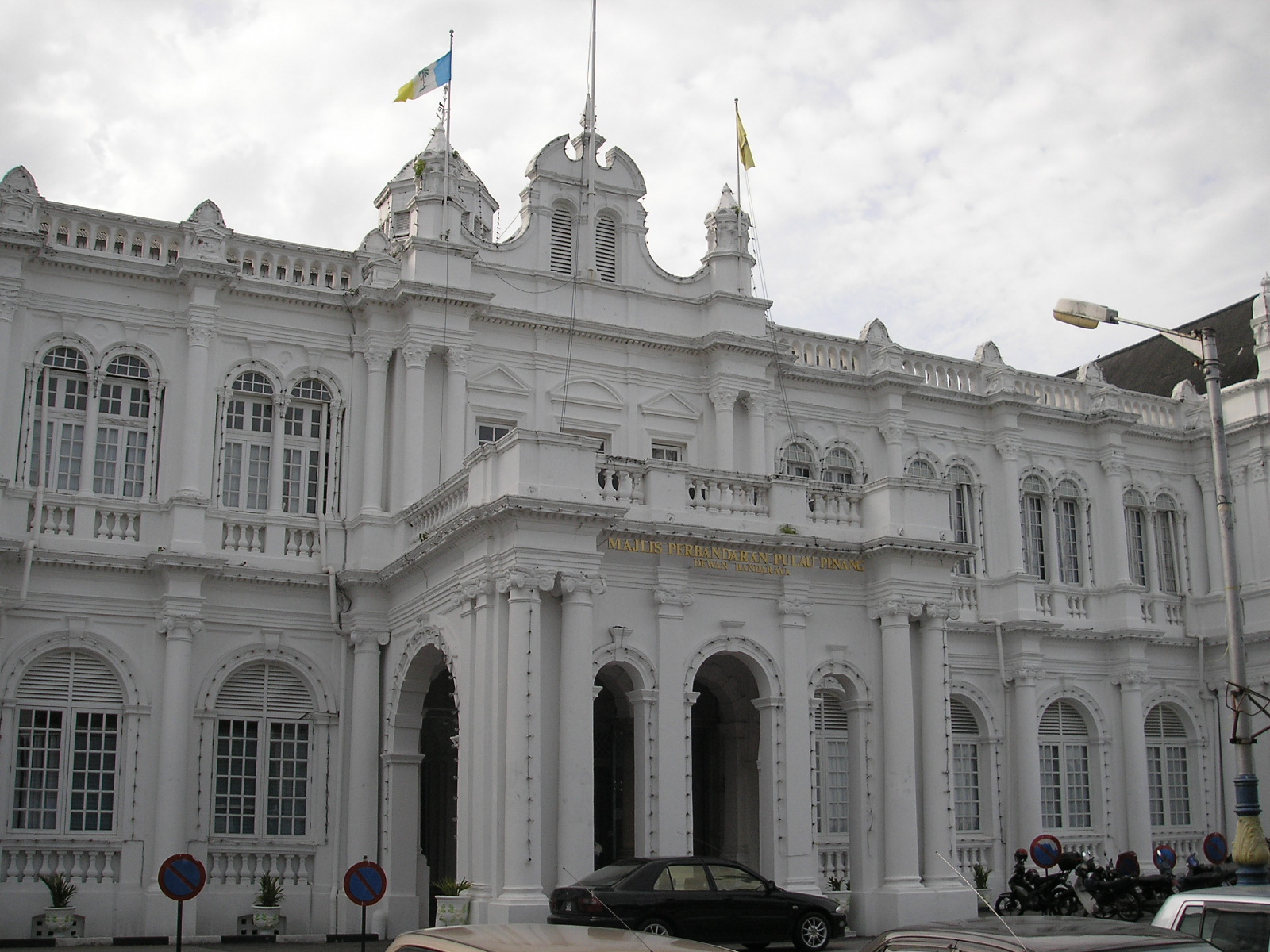
The City Hall, Penang

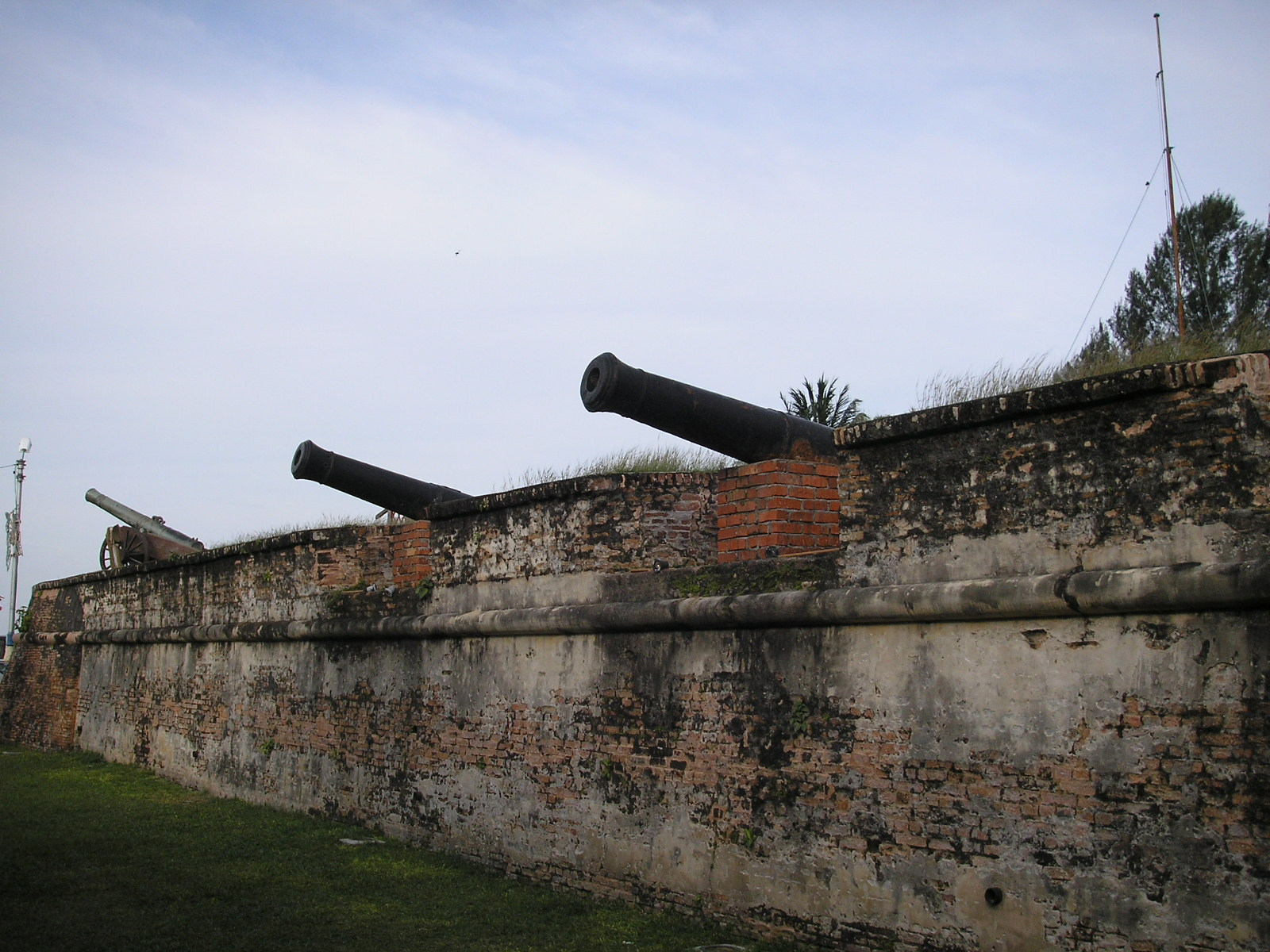
Fort Cornwallis in Penang

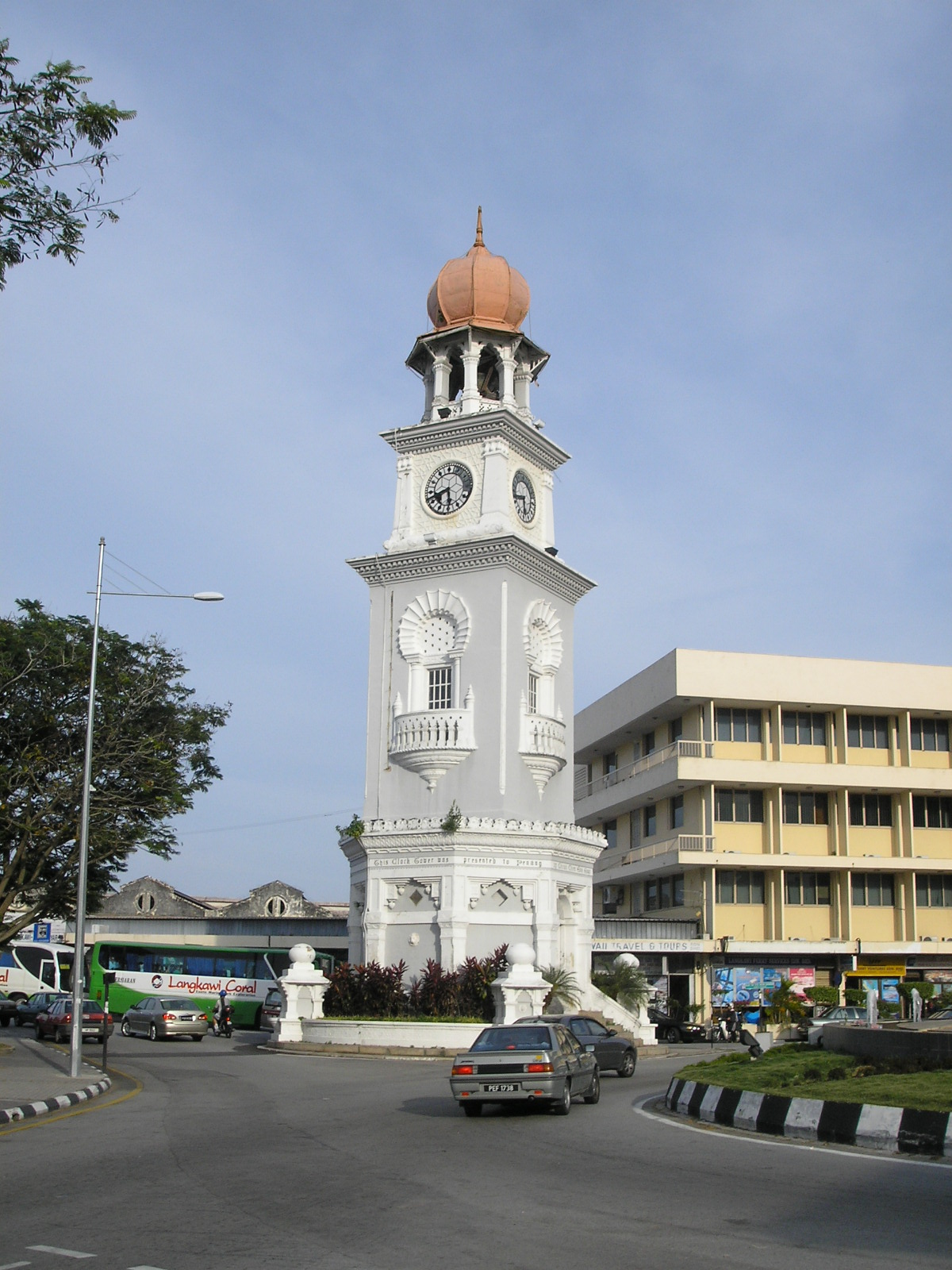
Queen Victoria Diamond Jubilee Clocktower, in Georgetown

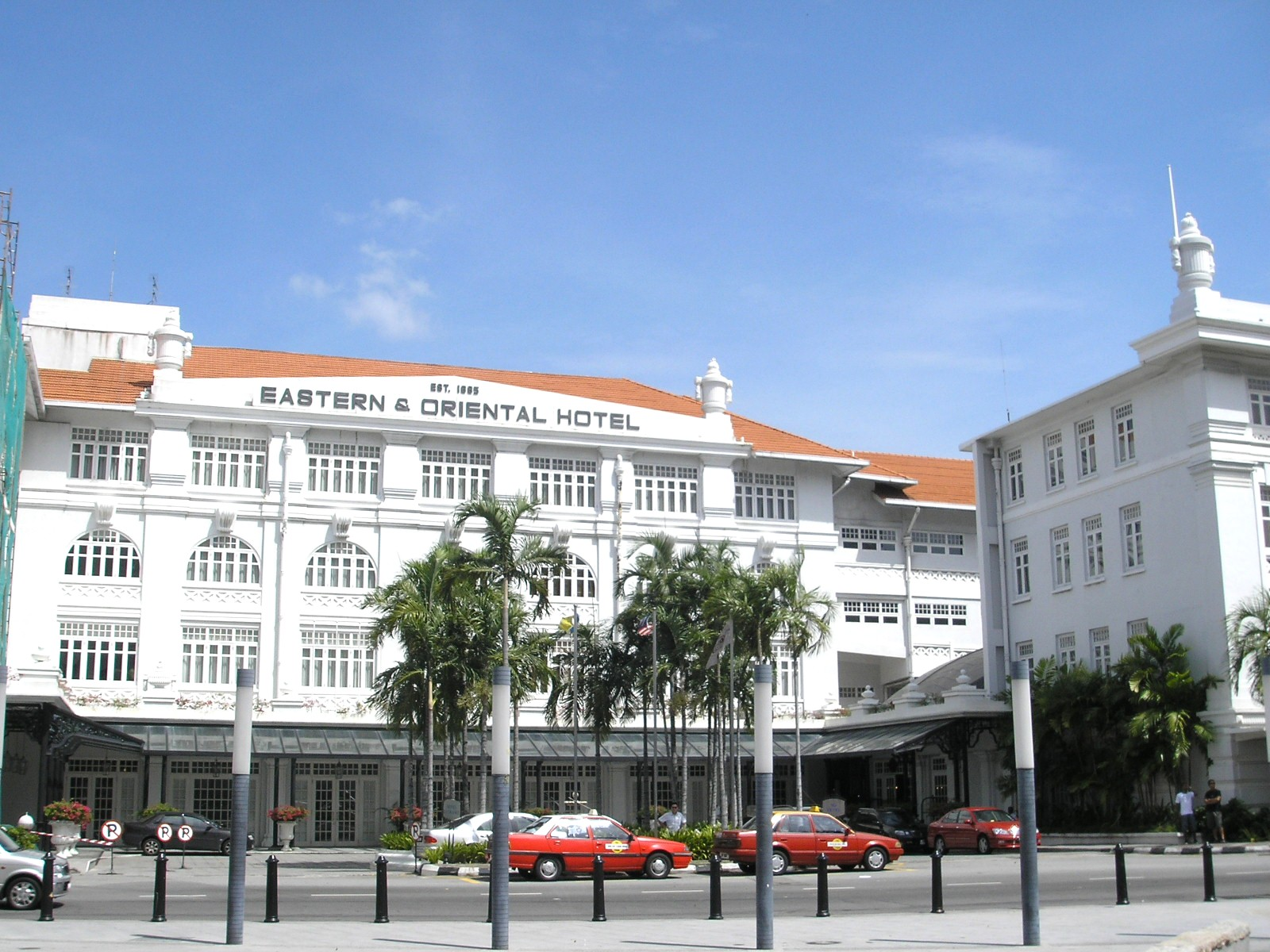
The colonial Eastern & Oriental Hotel

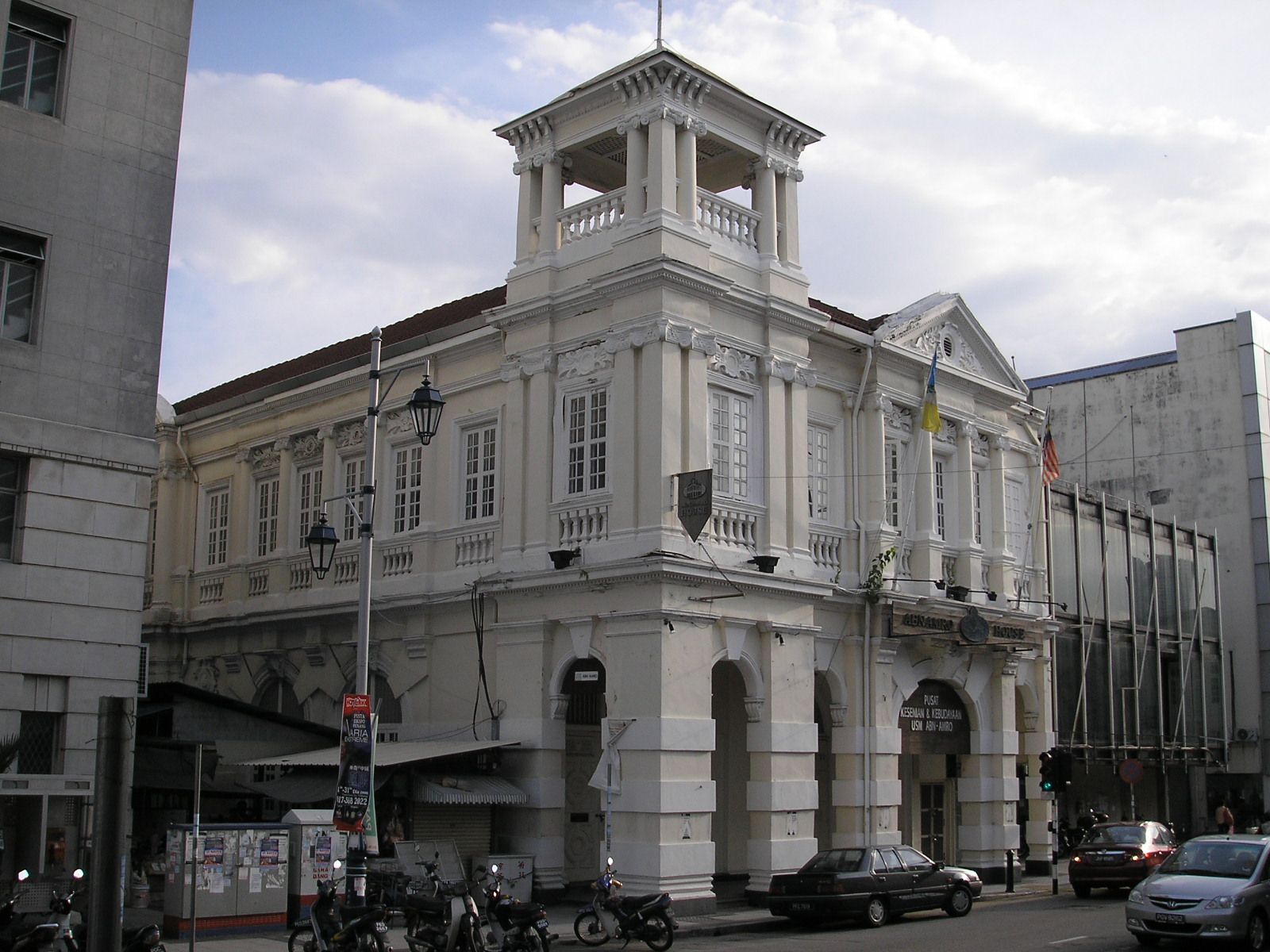
Beach Street, George Town, with banks. Pictured here is the Netherlands Trading Society Building, which currently houses the Bank of China

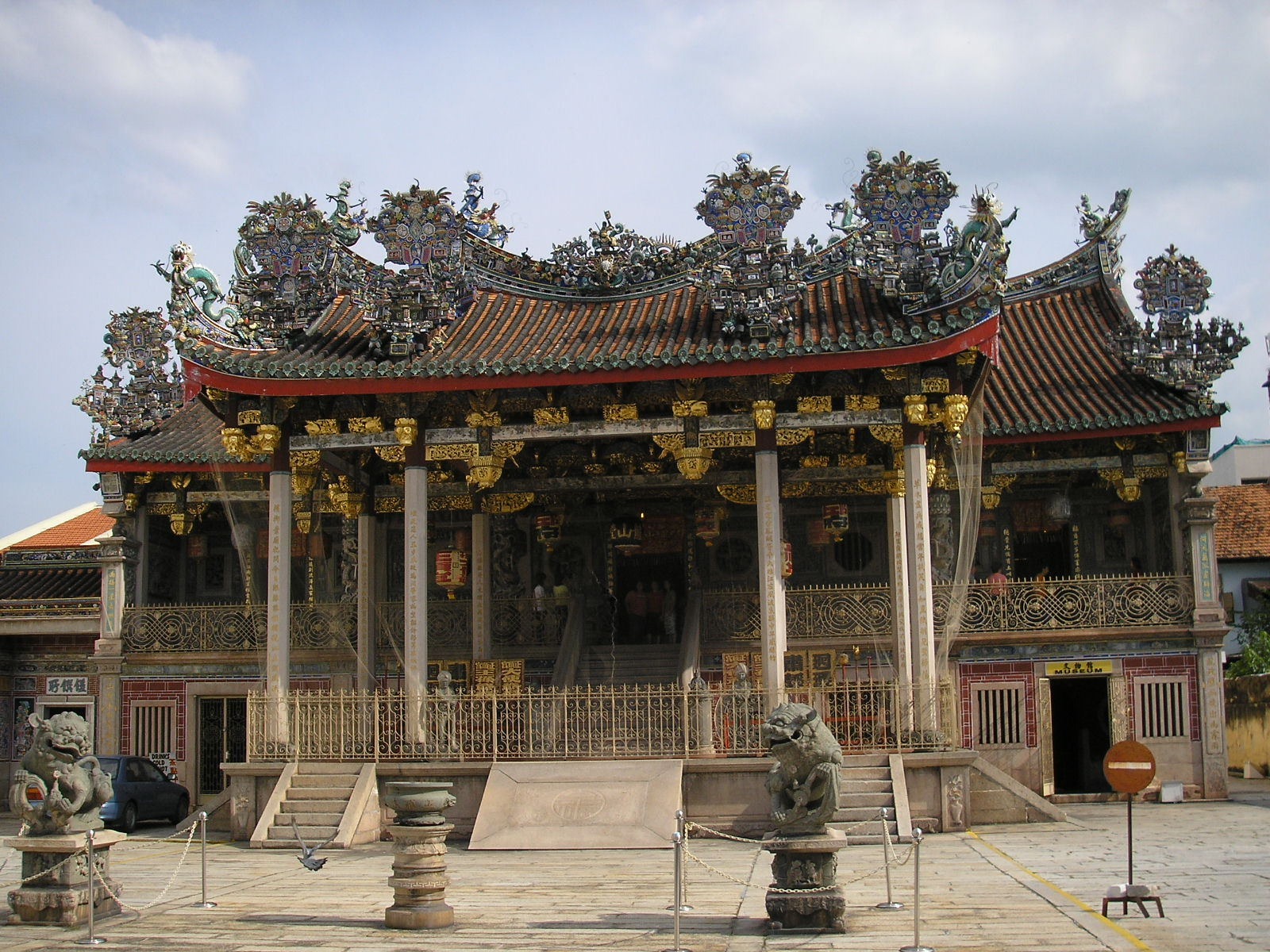
The Chinese Khoo Kongsi clan hall and temple

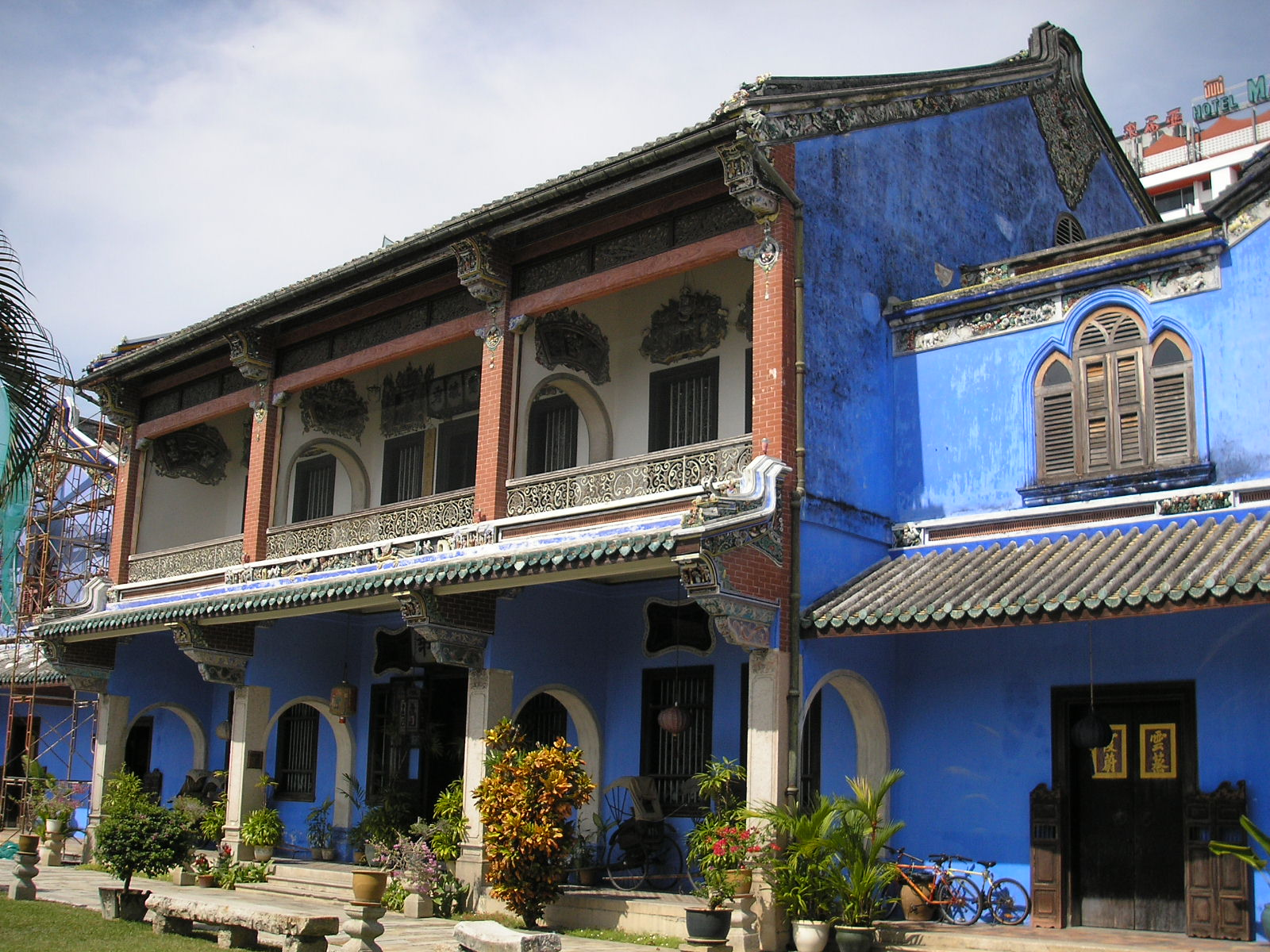
The "Blue Mansion"

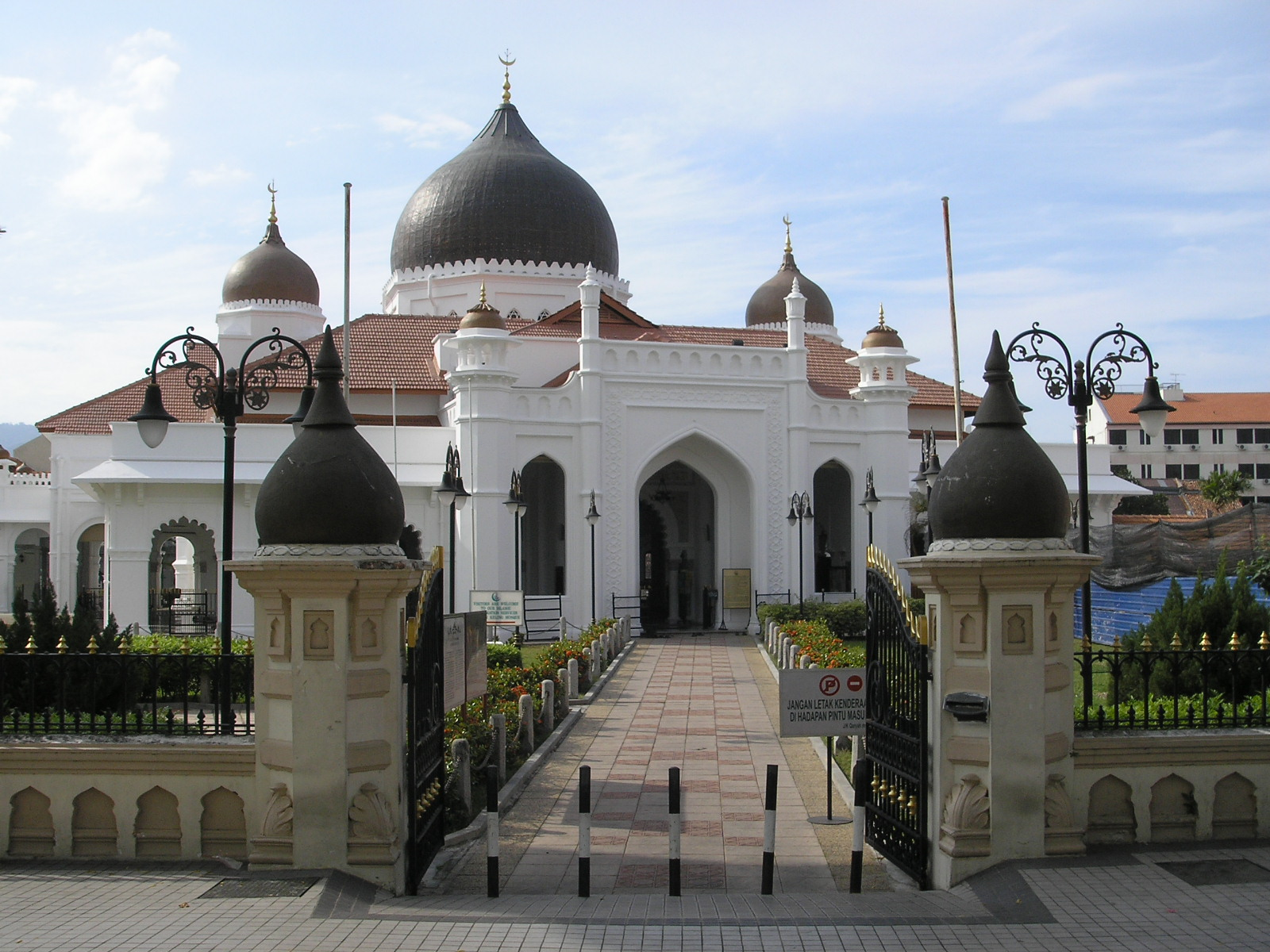
Kapitan Keling Mosque

The architecture of Penang reflects the 171 years of British presence on the island, coalescing with local, Chinese, Indian, Islamic and other elements to create a unique and distinctive brand of architecture. Along with Malacca, Penang is an architectural gem of Malaysia and Southeast Asia. Unlike Singapore, also a Straits Settlement, where many heritage buildings had to make way for modern skyscrapers and high-rise apartments due to rapid development and acute land scarcity, Penang's architectural heritage has enjoyed a better fate. Penang has one of the largest collections of pre-war buildings in Southeast Asia. This is for the most part due to the Rent Control Act which froze house rental prices for decades, making redevelopment unprofitable. With the repeal of this act in 2000 however, property prices skyrocketed and development has begun to encroach upon these buildings, many of which are in a regrettable state of disrepair. The government in recent years has allocated more funding to finance the restoration of a number of derelict heritage buildings, most notably Suffolk House, City Hall and historic buildings in the old commercial district.

== Colonial style ==
Fort Cornwallis, built by Francis Light as a defensive measure when he first gained possession of Penang island, is the oldest British structure in Penang, and indeed anywhere in Malaysia. Located where the Esplanade now stands and where he first landed on the island, it was originally built of wood and was subsequently replaced by brick.

The architecture of the Suffolk House is of the Anglo-Indian Garden House style, commonly found in British India. It sits upon land once owned by Light as his pepper estate whereupon light built a humble timber and attap garden house, noted in letters from visiting friends. The current colonnaded Euro-Indian Georgian building was thought to have been built by W. E. Phillips following his purchase of the land from Light's former partner Scott. Nestled on the bank of the Ayer Itam River, the building was used by Governor Bannerman—Phillip's father-in-law—amongst other Governors of Penang and also the Governors of the Straits Settlements. It was occupied by the Imperial Japanese administration during the Second World War. Later, it was utilised by the Methodist Boys' School which was built next to the house. Having weathered years of neglect, it has been meticulously restored with the help of researchers from the United Kingdom, Malaysia and Australia, and now operates as an upscale restaurant.

Other distinguished buildings from the colonial period include the City Hall, the Town Hall, the Eastern and Oriental Hotel (Penang's first grand hotel, older than its Singaporean sister the Raffles Hotel by two years), the Mansion, the Garage, the Standard Chartered Bank building, the HSBC building, the Southern Bank building, the Uplands International School building, as well as the great trading houses of Weld Quay. Many of these render the eclectic architectural styles of the Victorian and Georgian eras as well as Art Deco and Anglo-Indian.

== Chinese influence ==
Chinese immigrants brought with them architecture from their ancestral land as can be seen in the many Chinese temples and clan houses. Examples that stand out include the Cheong Fatt Tze Mansion (also known as the Blue Mansion), built by the namesake Qing-dynasty Chinese immigrant who was a hugely successful trader and community leader; the Kuan Yin Temple, the Khoo Kongsi, and the intricate clan house of the influential Khoo clan. The spectacular temple of Kek Lok Si at the foothill of Penang Hill is the largest Buddhist temple in Southeast Asia. Known as the Temple of Ten Thousand Buddhas, it was largely built by artisans and worksmen from China in the 19th century. A great many of the shophouses and residences found in George Town were built in the style of Straits-Chinese architecture with their very recognisable red terracotta roofs.

Nouveau riche Chinese millionaires of the time built themselves stately mansions along the famed Millionaires' Row of Northam Road (now Sultan Ahmad Shah Road). One of the most famous of them still standing today is the Yeap mansion Homestead, resplendent in white. The holiday palace of the Sultan of Kedah, Istana Kedah is also located on the same stretch.

Towkay Chung Thye Phin, last Kapitan China of Penang and Perak, was responsible for two exceptional pieces of architecture. The first was the fabled Chung Thye Phin Mansion where Gurney Drive meets Northam Road (No 2 Kelawai Road). People walking through the building found themselves strolling along subterranean passageways and chambers, gazing up at a clear glass dining room ceiling revealing live fish or marvelling at the art deco interiors of its rooms. After the death of its owner, the mansion was sold and turned into a hotel (The Shanghai Hotel) famous for its local music and "joget" dances. It was eventually demolished and on its footprint now stands an imposing condominium (1 Gurney Drive). On another part of the island, Chung designed Relau Villa, his holiday resort. The villa was equipped with a swimming pool ringed by private and other types of rooms. Its derelict structure can still be seen and explored today at Taman Metropolitan, Relau. According to family history, Kapitan Chung Thye Phin was inspired by the artistic canals of Venice and the enchanting ponds and lakes of China when he designed the swimming-pool, which was constructed by Mr. B. H. Ung, the first Chinese architect to make use of reinforced concrete buildings in the community, the Ban Hin Lee Bank being a particularly notable example.

Perhaps a more recent "addition" is the Peranakan Mansion Museum, which is located on the renovated complex originally built in 1893, by the wealthy Baba Nonya Kwee family and had remained vacant for over 50 years after the owner’s death. Restored by the museum sponsor, Mr. Peterson, in 2000, it reopened as a museum in 2004, preserving its original architectural features and showcasing the rich cultural fusion of the Baba Nonya community.

The mansion reflects the family’s significant wealth from tin mining and served as a social hub, featuring unique design elements like security mirrors and opium-smoking areas. Today, it remains a cultural landmark in Penang, displaying original furniture, artifacts, and family heirlooms that honor the heritage of the Baba Nonya community.

== Other influences ==
Indian Muslims made their mark in the Kapitan Keling Mosque located on its namesake road.

The Siamese and Burmese community of Penang built their imposing temples which portray architectural traditions of their two home nations. Three of the most famous examples are the Wat Chaiyamangkalaram (better known as the Sleeping Buddha Temple), Wat Buppharam and the Dhammikarama Burmese Temple. The Sri Lankan community had also built a temple known as Mahindarama Buddhist Temple in Penang.

== Protection ==
Penang has been submitting to list George Town on the UNESCO World Heritage Site since year 2000, which hope to put the state in a better position to protect her rich cultural heritage. On 7 July 2008, George Town and Malacca are formally inscribed as UNESCO World Heritage Sites with the title of Historic Cities of the Straits of Malacca.

George Town and Malacca have developed over 500 years of trading and cultural exchanges between East and West in the Straits of Malacca. The influences of Asia and Europe have endowed the towns with a specific multicultural heritage that is both tangible and intangible. With its government buildings, churches, squares and fortifications, Malacca demonstrates the early stages of this history originating in the 15th-century Malay sultanate and the Portuguese and Dutch periods beginning in the early 16th century. Featuring residential and commercial buildings, George Town represents the British era from the end of the 18th century. The two towns constitute a unique architectural and cultural townscape without parallel anywhere in East and Southeast Asia.

== See also ==
- Chinese architecture (Thni Kong Tnua, Kong Hock Keong, Snake Temple & Eng Chuan Tong)
- City Hall, Penang
- List of tallest buildings in Penang Island
- Penang Bridge
