= Penang Chinese Town Hall =

- 檳州華人大會堂 (Traditional Chinese)
- Predecessor: Goddess of Mercy Temple
- Formation: 1881; 145 years ago
- Official language: Mandarin
- Website: https://www.pcth.org.my/

UNESCO World Heritage Site
- Type: Cultural
- Criteria: ii, iii, iv
- Designated: 2008 (32nd session)
- Part of: George Town UNESCO Core Zone
- Reference no.: 1223
- Region: Asia-Pacific
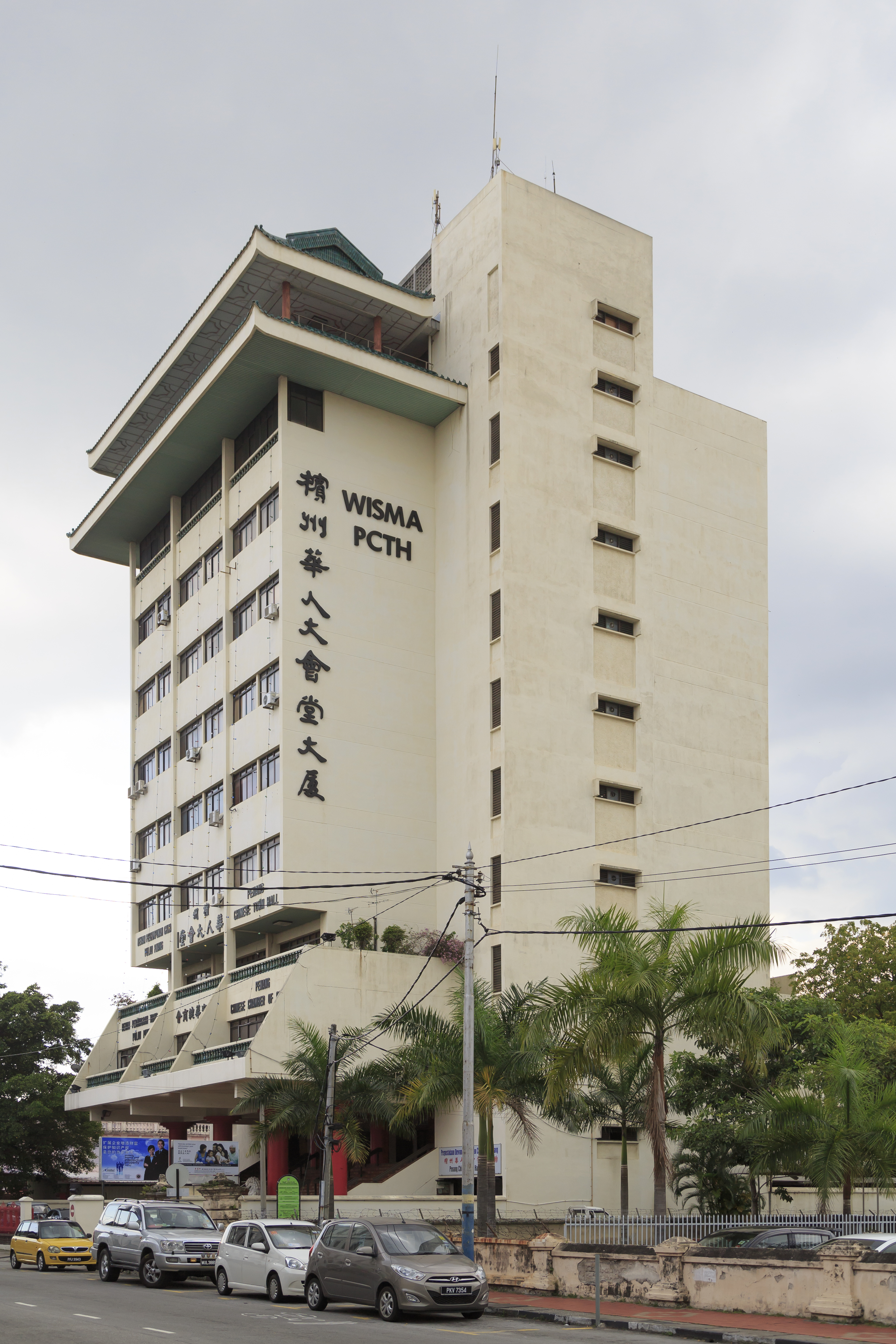

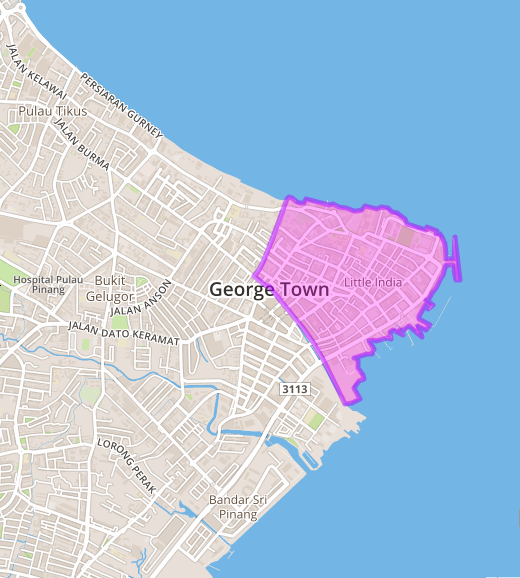
- Location within central George Town, Penang

General information
- Location: Malaysia, Pitt Street, 10200 George Town, Penang, Malaysia, George Town, Penang
- Coordinates: 5.4189°N 100.3390°E
- Construction started: 1975
- Completed: 1978
- Inaugurated: 1983

Technical details
- Floor count: 10

Building details

The Penang Chinese Town Hall was established in 1881. Chung Keng Quee was the single largest individual donor towards the founding of the town hall and was a prominent president serving from 1881 to 1883.

The main donors for the inauguration of the Penang Chinese Town Hall were the British Colonial Office (10,000 yuan), the Fukien Association (2,000 yuan), Ch'ao-chou Prefecture (1,800 yuan), Ch'iu Lineage Association (1,000 yuan), Hsieh Lineage Association (800 yuan), Cheng Ssu-wen (the fancy name of Chung Keng Quee) (600 yuan), and the Yang Clan of Ying-yuan kung (500 yuan). Two hundred and seventeen more donors contributed between 480 yuan to 10 yuan; a total of about 26,000 yuan was collected.

In June 1905, Chinese merchants in Penang gathered in the Penang Chinese Town Hall, in support of the boycott on American goods, joining Singapore and China in putting pressure on the American government to improve its immigration policy towards the Chinese.

In the election of the office bearer on 9 September 1906, Leong Lok Hing was made General President, Foo Choo Choon, Cheah Meng Chi, Chung Thye Phin and Lim Kek Chuan were made president, and Ng See Sin, Oon Boon Tan, Khaw Joo Tok, Quah Beng, Ong Hun Chong, Koh Leap Teng and Gnoh Lean Tuck were elected vice president.

On 22 June 2008 Penang Chinese Town Hall chairman, Tan Sri Lim Gait Tong said it was relevant to set up a special committee to establish the actual date it was founded because their records showed conflicting years in which the organisation was set up. He said that although the organisation's constitution stated that it was established in 1875, certain members had claimed that it was set up in 1881 and 1883.
