= Town Hall, Penang =

Town Hall
- Dewan Bandaran
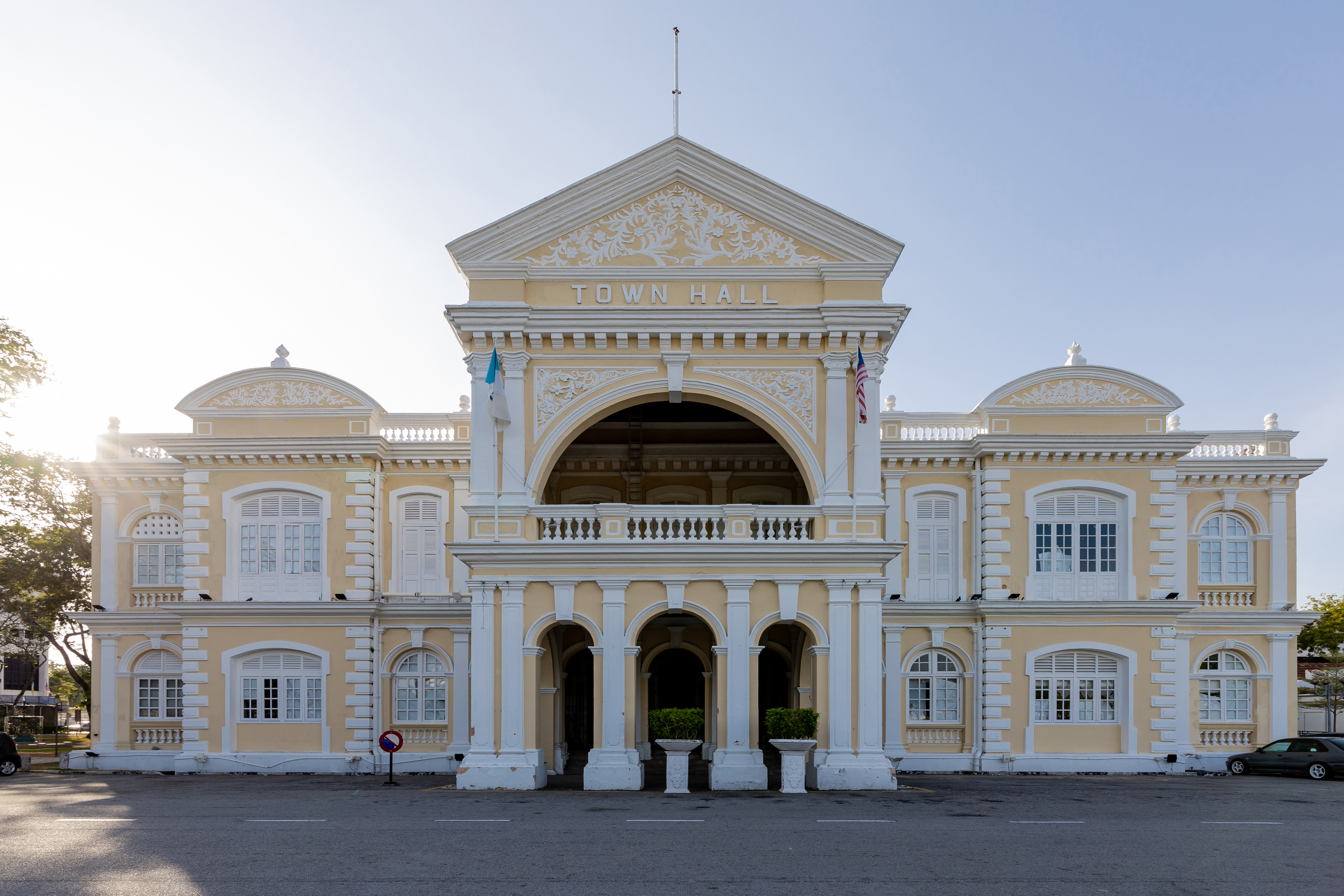

General information
- Location: Esplanade Road, 10200 George Town, Penang, Malaysia, George Town, Penang, Malaysia
- Coordinates: 5.421088°N 100.341353°E
- Construction started: 1879; 147 years ago
- Inaugurated: 1880; 146 years ago
- Cost: $35,000

Technical details
- Floor count: 2

UNESCO World Heritage Site
- Type: Cultural
- Criteria: ii, iii, iv
- Designated: 2008 (32nd session)
- Part of: George Town UNESCO Core Zone
- Reference no.: 1223
- Region: Asia-Pacific

The Town Hall is a British-built administrative building in George Town, Penang, Malaysia. It is located adjacent to the City Hall, which now serves as the seat of the Penang Island City Council.

Completed in the 1880s, the Town Hall is the city's oldest municipal building, as it once housed the Municipal Commission of George Town. It also functioned as a venue for social events for the European elites. However, its administrative function was taken over by the City Hall upon the latter's completion in 1903. The Town Hall has been gazetted by the Malaysian National Museum as a historic monument since 1993. More recently, the building became one of the filming locations for the 1999 film, Anna and the King.

Both the Town Hall and the City Hall are located at Esplanade Road, overlooking the historic parade ground (the Padang) within the Esplanade. The buildings are also situated within George Town's UNESCO World Heritage Site.

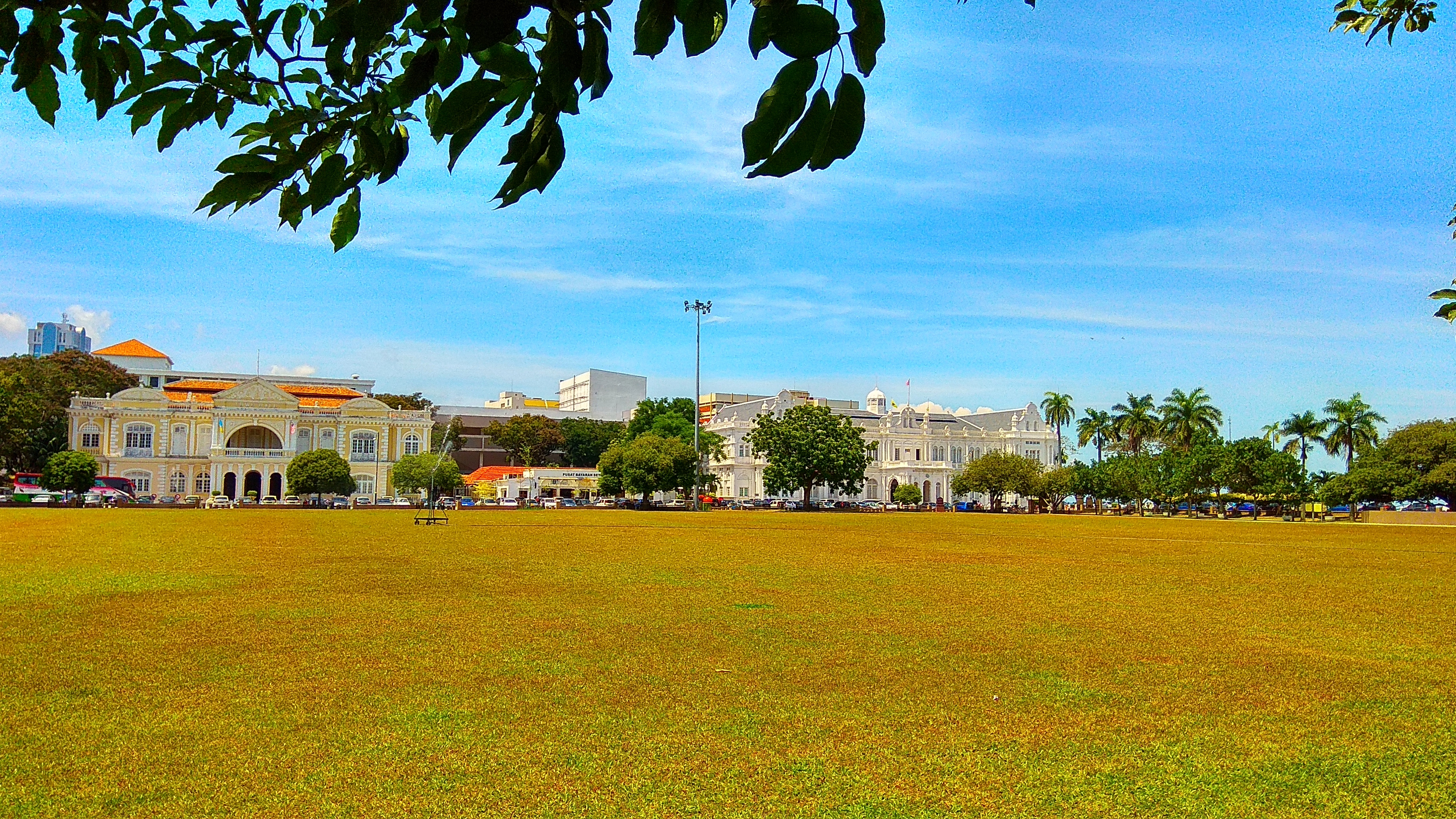
The Town Hall (left) and the City Hall (right) along Esplanade Road, overlooking the Esplanade's Padang.

== History ==
The history of George Town's municipal accommodations began in 1873, when a proposal to build a Town Hall was first mooted. During a Straits Settlements Legislative Council session in Singapore on 23 February 1876, Penang's representative, David Brown, brought forward a motion proposing the construction of the Town Hall next to the Esplanade in George Town, based on an earlier written agreement with George Town's Municipal Commissioners. Brown argued that while "all the Singapore works which were provided for under the same Ordinance have been completed", no such public works were being undertaken in George Town at the time.

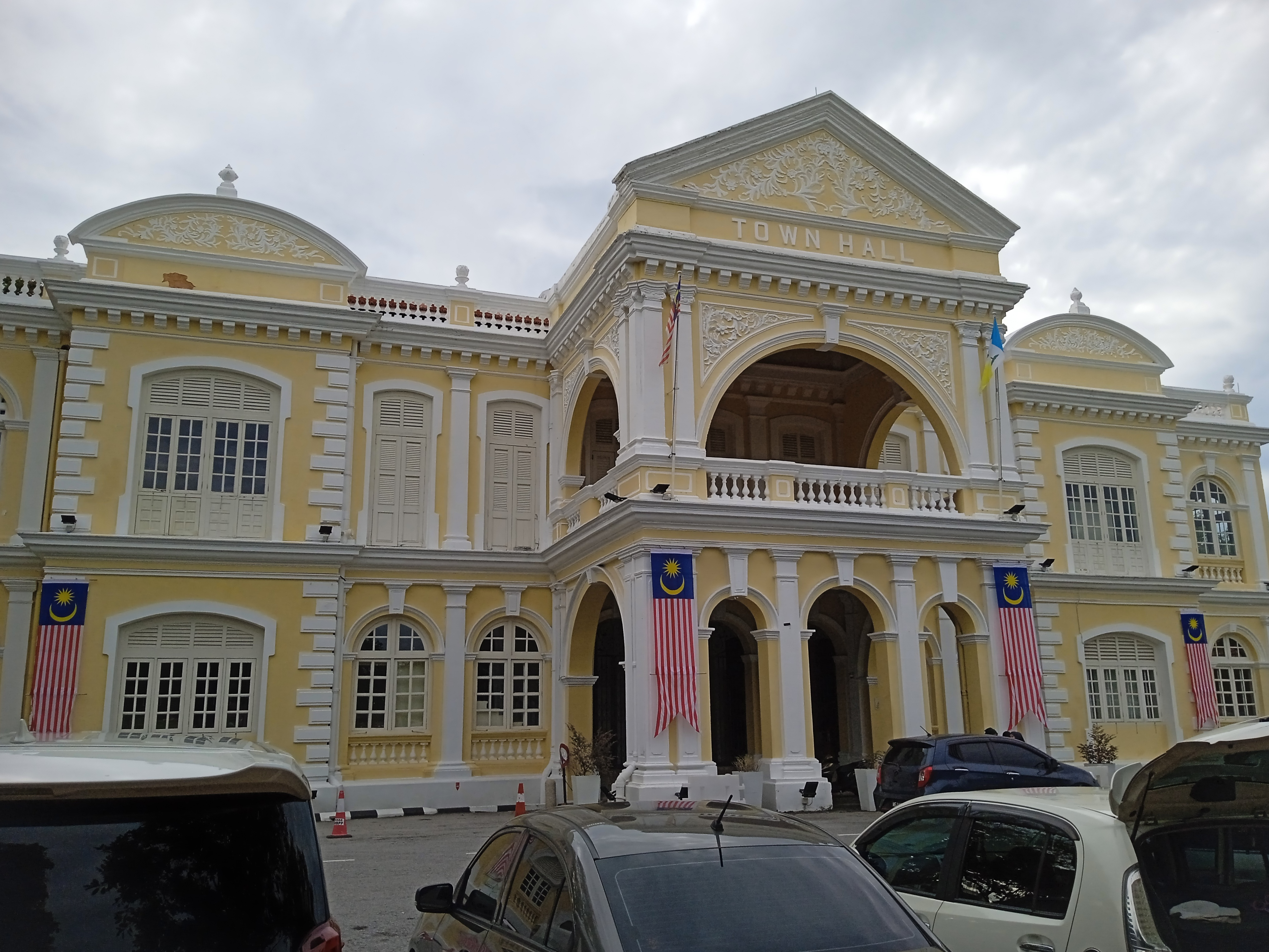
The front central façade of the Town Hall

While the motion was seconded by his fellow Assemblyman, Thomas Scott, it was opposed by the Governor of the Straits Settlements, the Colonial Secretary and the Colonial Engineer, and the motion was eventually withdrawn. Nonetheless, the Town Hall project went ahead. Tenders for the construction of the building were called for in 1878 and on 1 January 1879, the first foundation stone was laid by the then Lieutenant-Governor of Penang, Colonel Archibald Anson. The building was designed by British Army engineers, Captains Innes and Satterthwaite, while its construction cost amounted to $35,000 (Spanish dollars).

In 1880, the then Acting Lieutenant-Governor of Penang, Charles John Irving, who also simultaneously served as the President of the Municipal Commission of George Town, considered moving the offices of the Municipal Commission into the Town Hall, which was still under construction at that point.

In August that year, the Town Hall was officially opened. The inauguration of the city's first municipal building, held with much fanfare, was attended by the then Governor of the Straits Settlements, Sir Frederick Weld. A marching band from Johor was appointed for this special occasion by the then Maharajah of Johor, Sultan Sir Abu Bakar.

However, the Municipal Commission of George Town soon found the office space within the Town Hall to be insufficient. Plans were then drawn up for the construction of another building right next door. The adjacent Edwardian Baroque-style building, named the Municipal Offices, was completed in 1903. The Municipal Offices would later be renamed the City Hall when George Town was granted city status in 1957, and to this day, houses the Penang Island City Council.

Meanwhile, the Town Hall continued to function as a venue for social events reserved for the European elite; local Asians were often denied entry. As a result, the building was known as the 'European Club' (Penang Hokkien: Ang Moh Kong Kuan).

The Town Hall was renovated several times, in 1890, 1903, 1938 and 1991. However, over time, the building became disused, while the more recent renovation works did not take into account the original building materials. In 1993, when it emerged that the Penang Island Municipal Council was considering the demolition of the Town Hall, the Malaysian National Museum intervened by gazetting the colonial building as a Grade 1 historical monument under the Antiquities Act. The Town Hall was subsequently renovated in 2004.

Today, the Town Hall is mainly used for public events, art exhibitions and as part of the annual George Town Festival in August.

== Media appearances ==
- Anna and the King

== See also ==
- Architecture of Penang
- Esplanade, Penang
- Light Street, George Town
