= Goddess of Mercy Temple =

Taoist temple in George Town, Malaysia

- Malay: Tokong Dewa Kuan Yin Teng; Chinese: 觀音亭
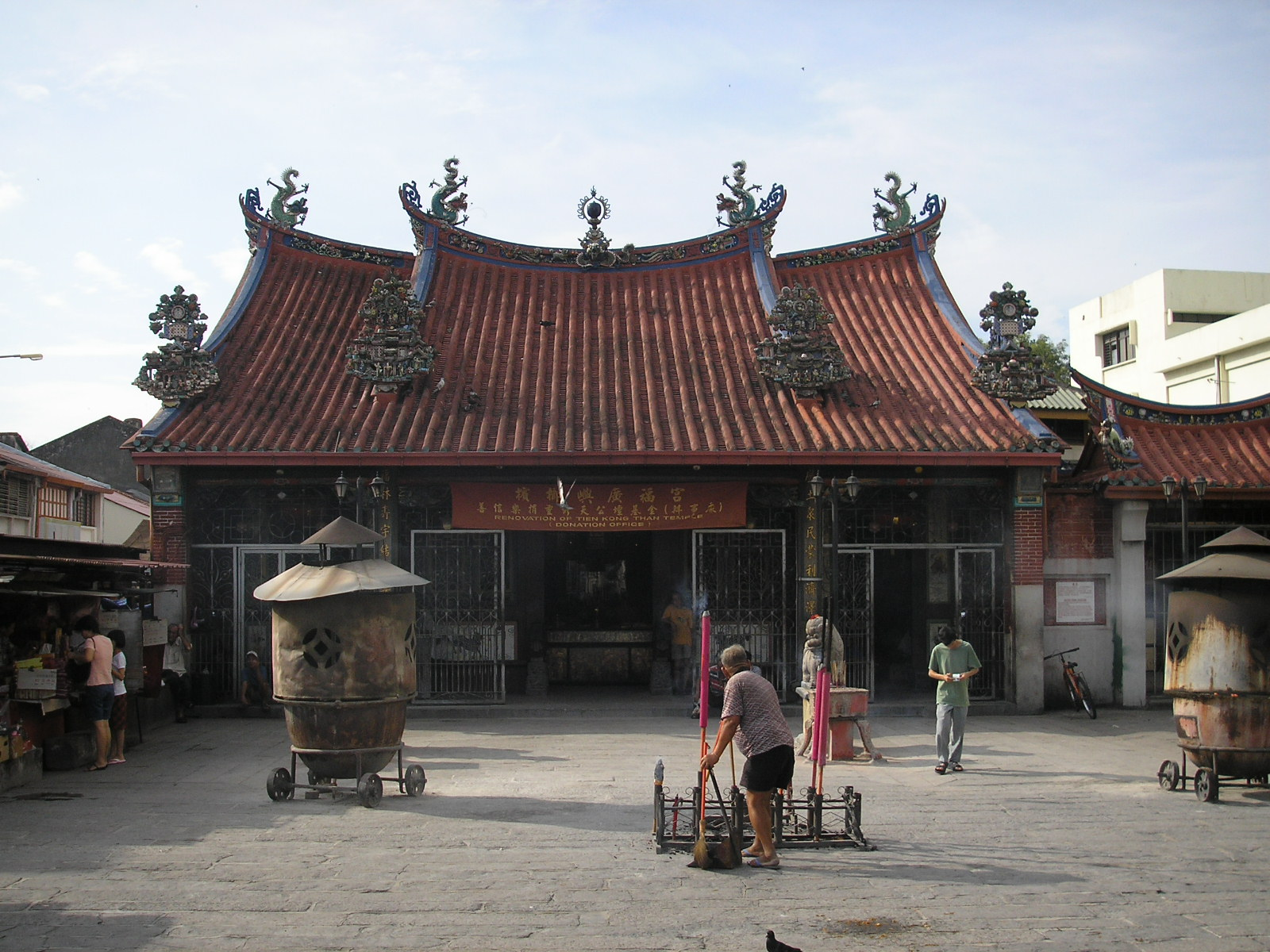

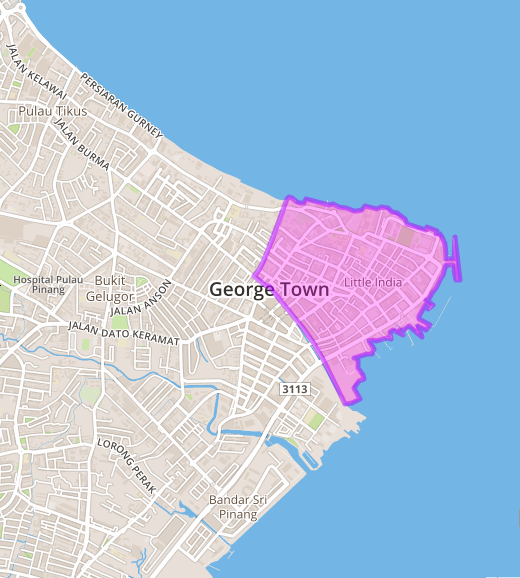
- Location within George Town (in the UNESCO Core Zone)

Religion
- Affiliation: Buddhism
- Status: Active

Location
- Location: Pitt Street
- Municipality: George Town
- State: Penang
- Country: Malaysia
- Coordinates: 5°25′6.398″N 100°20′19.651″E

Architecture
- Type: Chinese temple
- Established: 1800
- Construction cost: $4,000 (Spanish dollar)
- UNESCO World Heritage Site
- Type: Cultural
- Criteria: ii, iii, iv
- Designated: 2008 (32nd session)
- Reference no.: 1223
- Part of: George Town UNESCO Core Zone
- Region: Asia-Pacific

The Goddess of Mercy Temple (Chinese: 觀音亭; Pe̍h-ōe-jī: Koan-im-têng), also known as Kuan Im Teng or Kong Hock Keong, is a Mahayana Buddhist temple within George Town in the Malaysian state of Penang. Located at Pitt Street, it was built in 1800, making it the oldest Chinese temple in the state.

The temple is dedicated to the Taoist deities and Buddhist Bodhisattva of Mercy, Guan Yin. However, it had been originally established for the worship of Mazu, a sea deity. Following the establishment of George Town in 1786, droves of Chinese migrants flocked to the city, causing the transition of the temple into one dedicated to Guan Yin by 1824; by then, it also began to function as a neutral mediator between the rival Cantonese and Hokkien communities.

While the temple's more secular functions have since been passed on to the Penang Chinese Town Hall, it retains its religious significance amongst Penangites of Chinese descent. It remains a focal point for Chinese festivities such as the annual feast days for Guan Yin and the Jade Emperor's Birthday, attracting devotees from across Southeast Asia.

== History ==
The temple was founded in 1800. Built at a cost of $4,000 Spanish dollars, it was dedicated to Mazu, a sea goddess worshipped by the Hokkiens as a patron for seafarers. At the time, Penang Island was sparsely populated, and the temple, built by the seafaring Hokkiens, was located relatively closer to the sea. The temple was renovated in 1824, during which the temple's main deity was changed from Mazu to Guan Yin. Other Chinese deities, including Guan Yu and Tua Pek Kong, were also added into the temple, reflecting the more diverse Chinese community in George Town by that point. Decades of Chinese immigration since the founding of George Town by Captain Francis Light in 1786 had resulted in several Chinese dialect groups establishing themselves within the new settlement, including the Cantonese. The temple began to play the role as a mediator site in the increasingly frequent disputes between the Hokkiens and the Cantonese. In its early years, it was run by a committee that consisted of equal numbers from the two ethnic groups. Thus, the temple was able to serve as a council and a tribunal for Penang's Chinese community up until the mid-19th century.

The worsening feud between the various Chinese ethnic groups in George Town, which culminated in the Penang Riots of 1867, eventually led to the establishment of the Penang Chinese Town Hall in 1881 to take over the temple's more secular role as an arbiter for the local Chinese community. From then on, the temple serves a more religious purpose amongst the local Chinese. The temple has been rumoured to possess magical qualities, as it miraculously survived the several attacks on the temple since its inception in 1800. For instance, the temple remained unscathed when the Imperial Japanese Army (IJA) bombed and invaded Penang in December 1941, and survived a handful of other attacks before and during the 1960s. The temple was last renovated between 2012 and 2017.

== Features ==
Steeped in Chinese architecture, the temple features sweeping roofs typical of Chinese temples and has gigantic doors adorned with paintings of Taoist and Buddhist deities. Dragon-entwined pillars support the high roof as well, which is decorated with more dragon figurines at its top ridges. The temple is fronted by a large courtyard that faces Pitt Street to the east. It was built according to feng shui principles; it has three wells – one to the right of the main shrine, another at the front courtyard and the third hidden under the main altar of Guan Yin. The courtyard well is for public use, while the one beside the main shrine is reserved for monks. Urban legend has it that the water from the hidden well has medicinal properties.

== Gallery ==
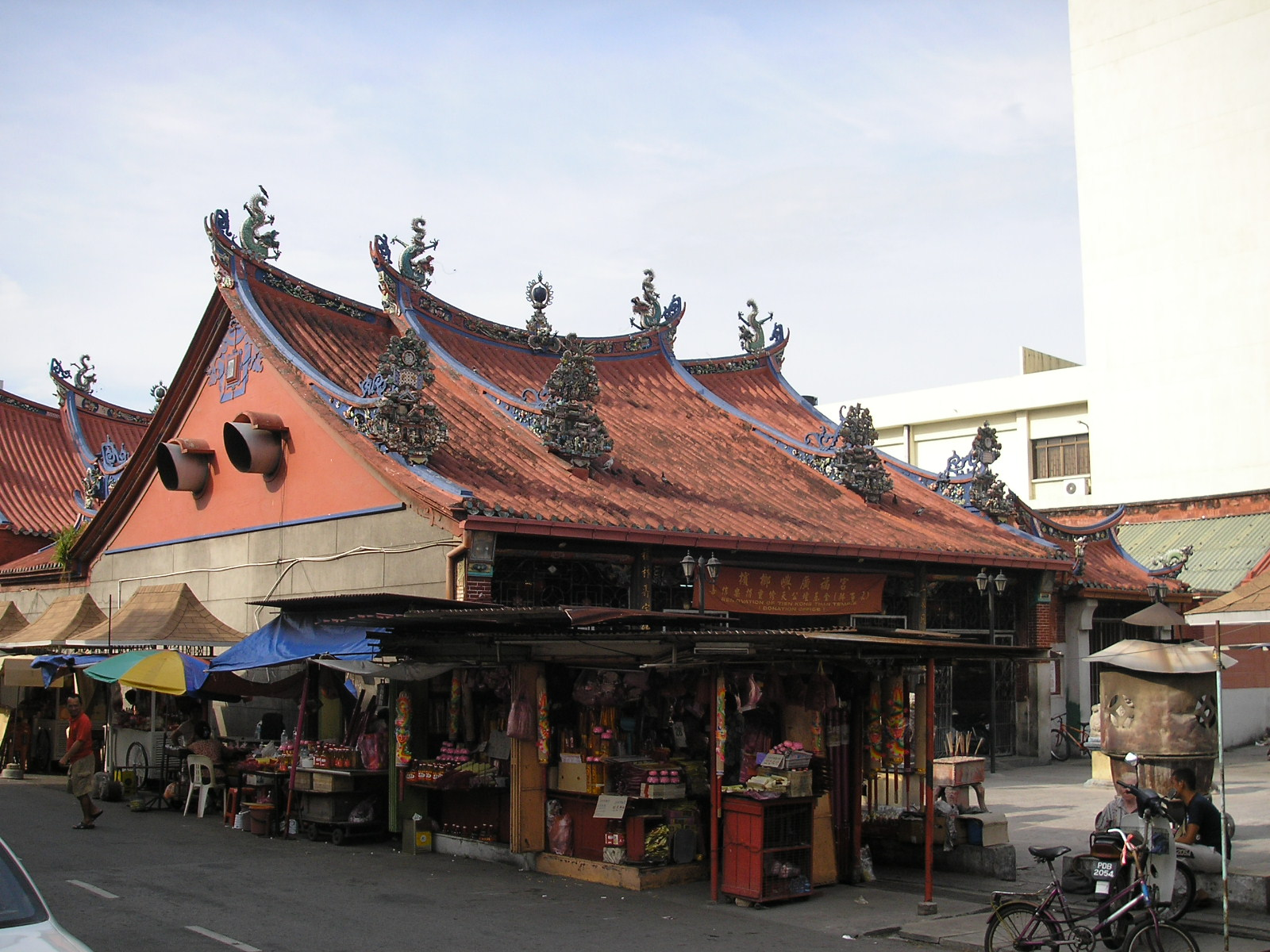
Roadside stalls selling prayer paraphernalia beside the Goddess of Mercy Temple.

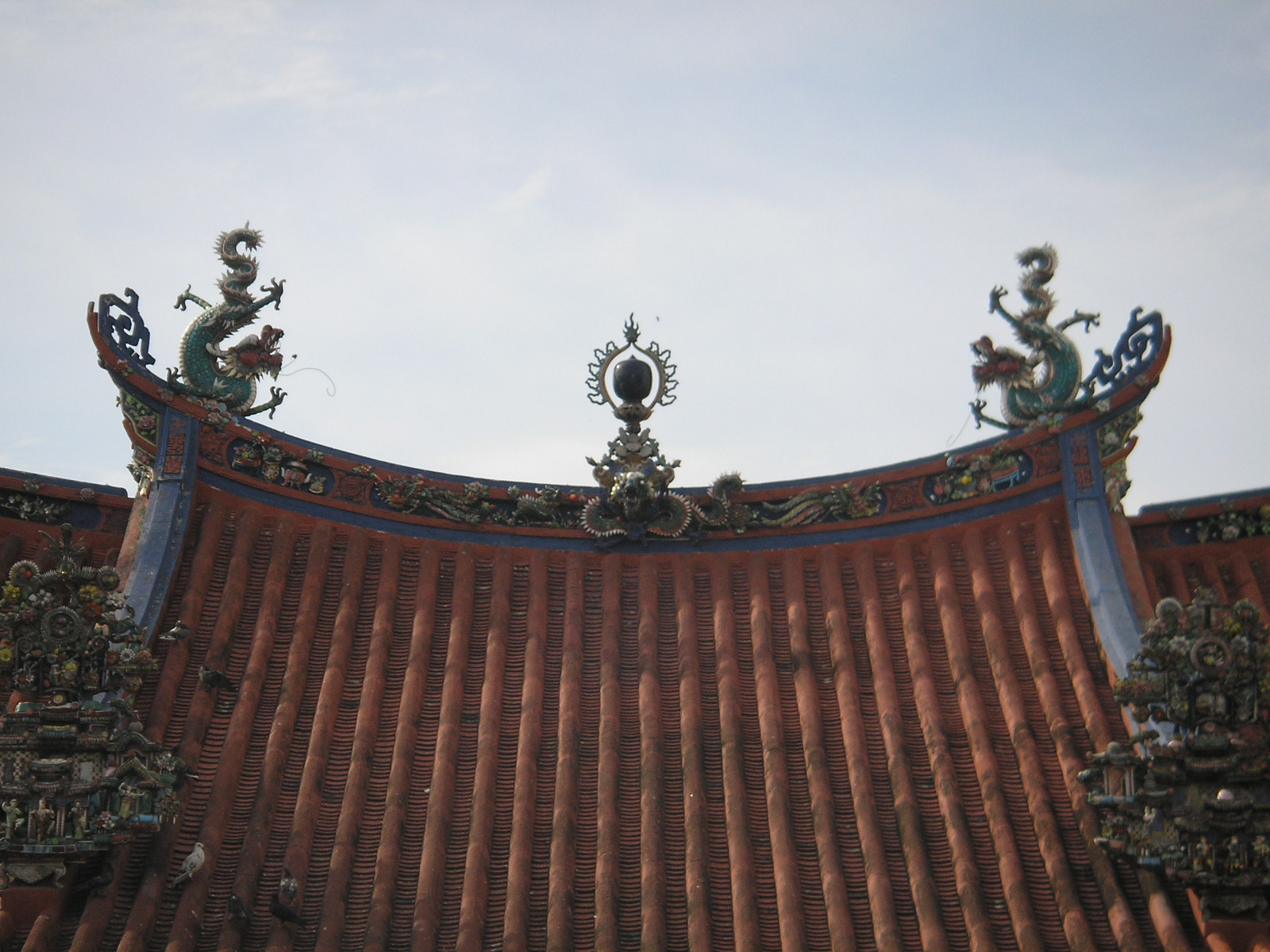
Southern Chinese architectural influences can be seen on the roof, which is adorned with various figurines.

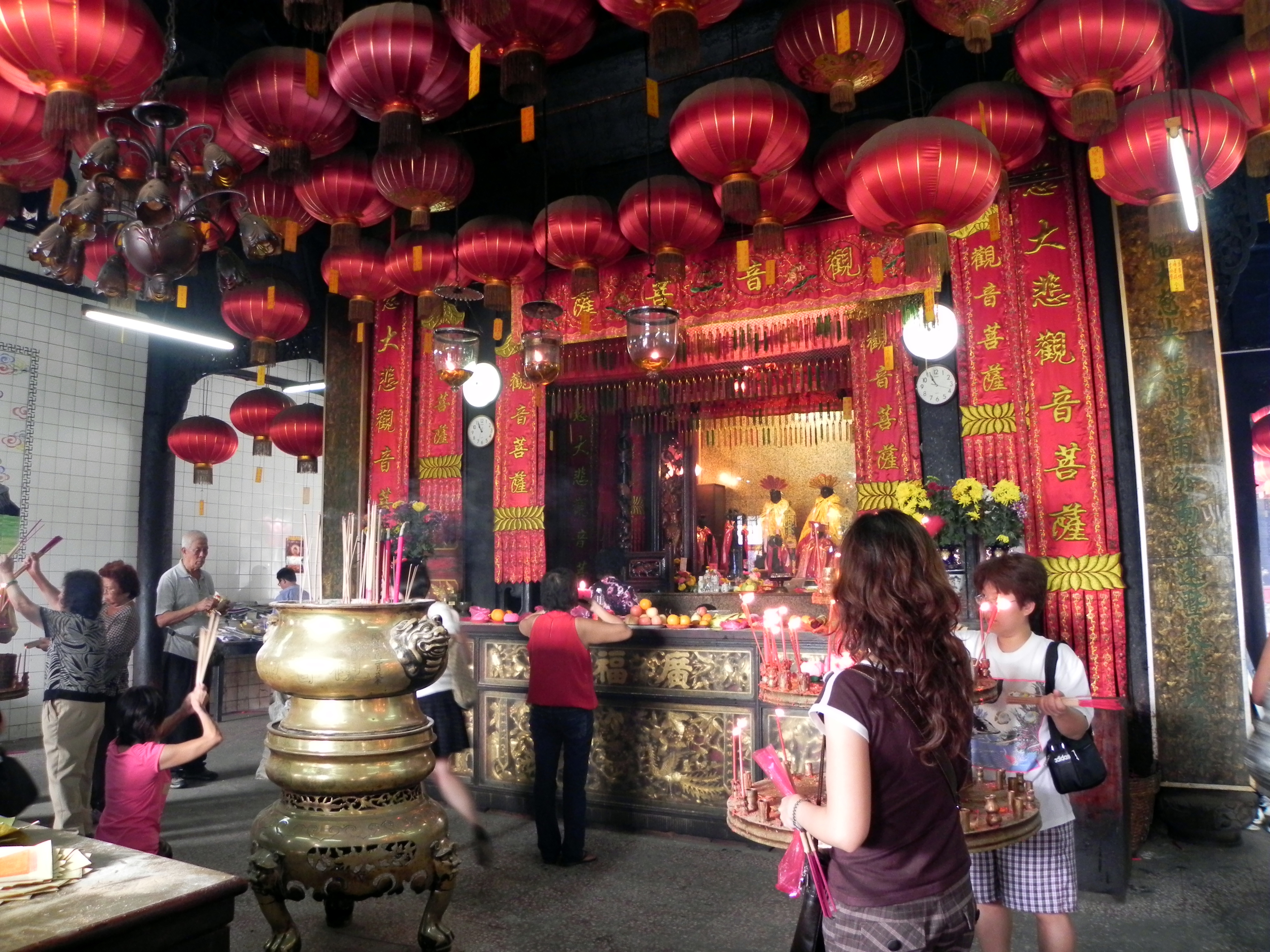
The temple praying hall.

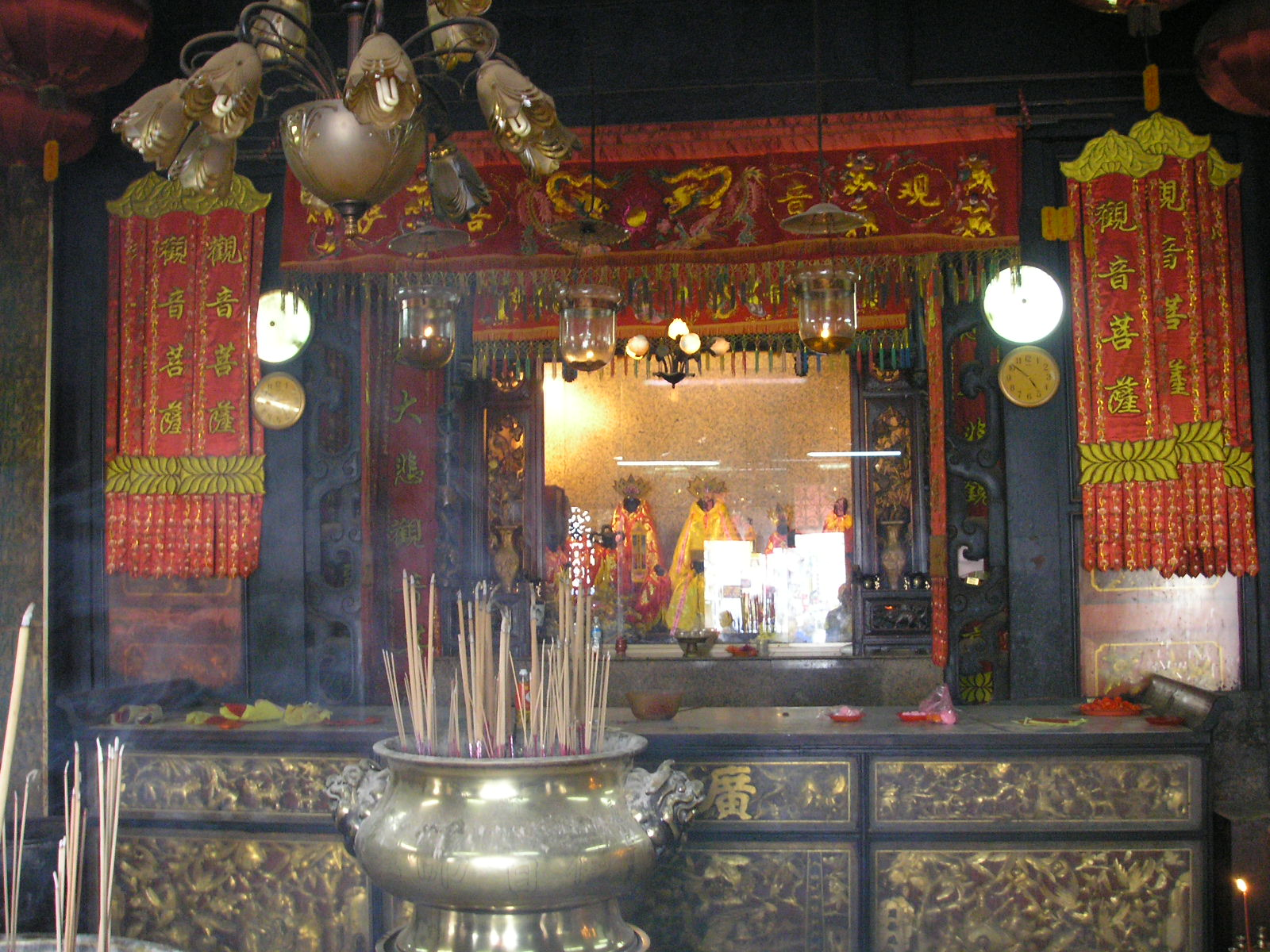
The temple's main altar to Guan Yin.

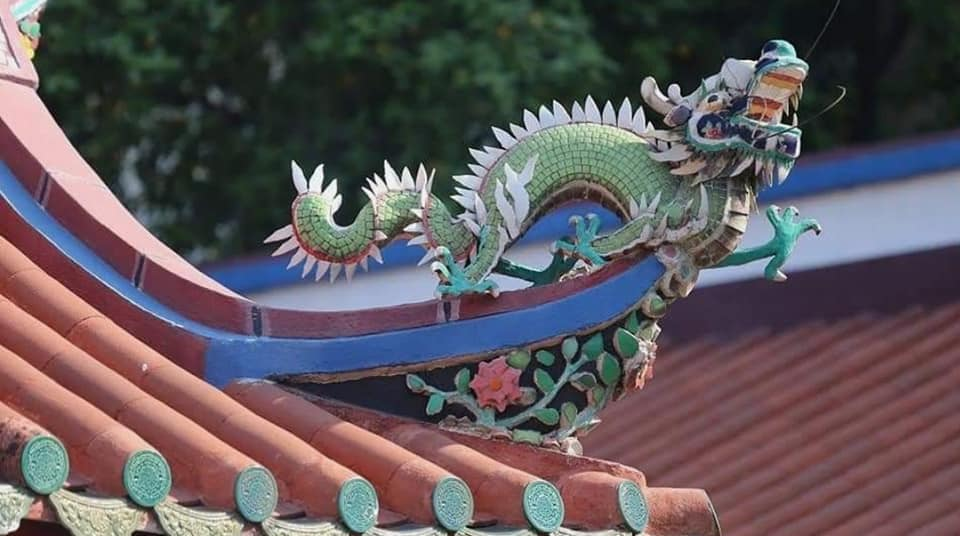
A colourful ceramic dragon figure on the rooftop corner of the Guanyin Temple.

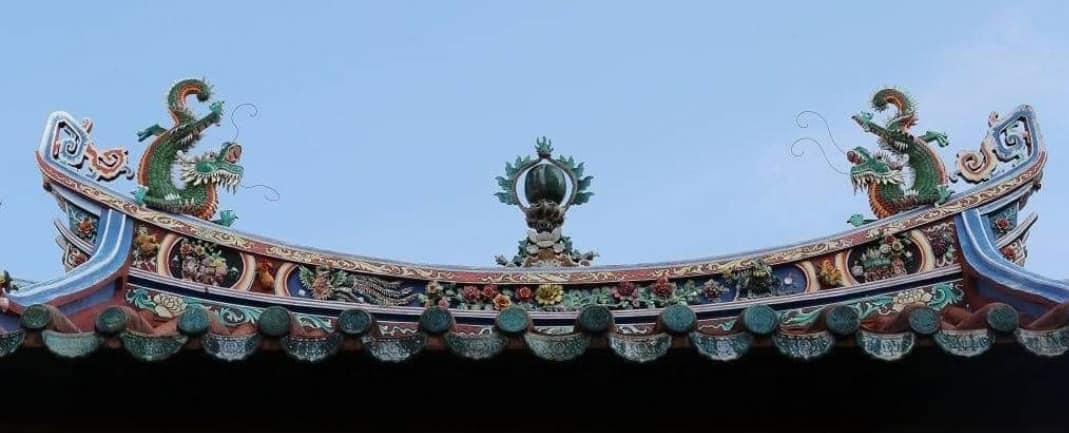
The ornate rooftop ridge of the temple is decorated with twin dragons and floral motifs.

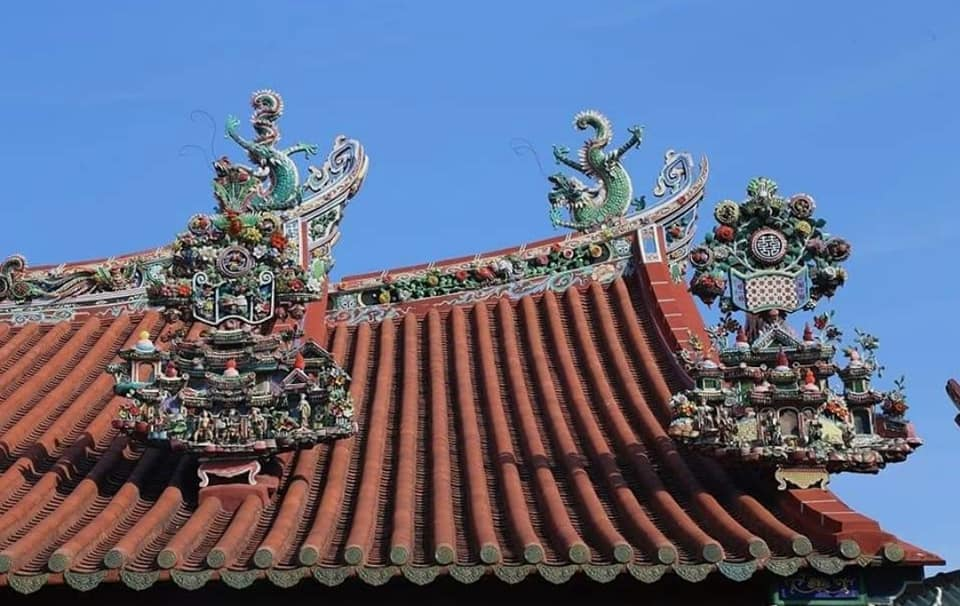
Roof top view showcasing detailed ceramic figurines and mythological elements atop the ridged tiles of the main temple structure.

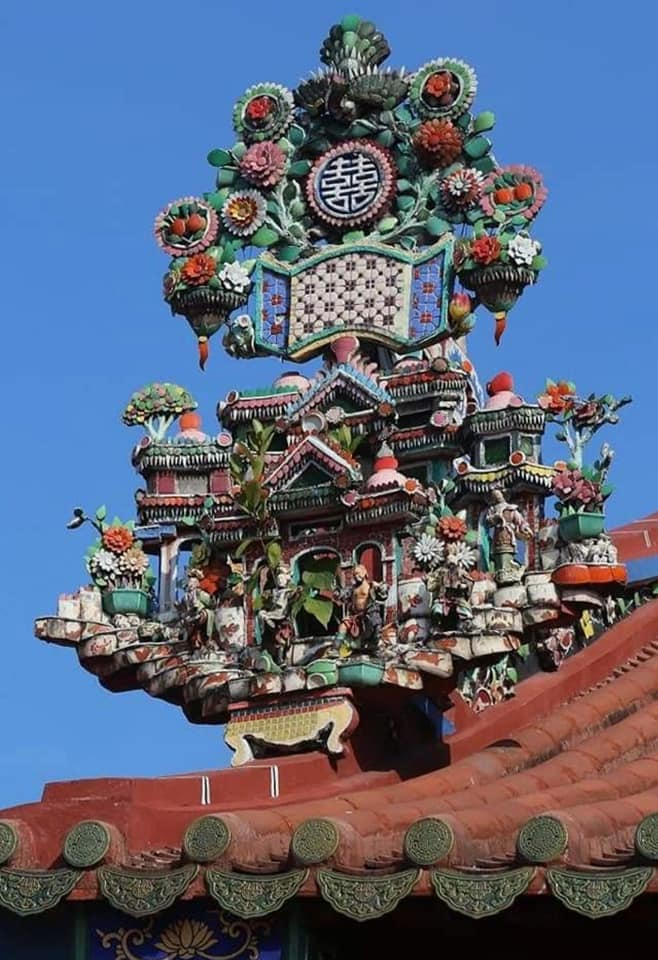
Close-up of the rooftop miniature pagoda and floral carvings.

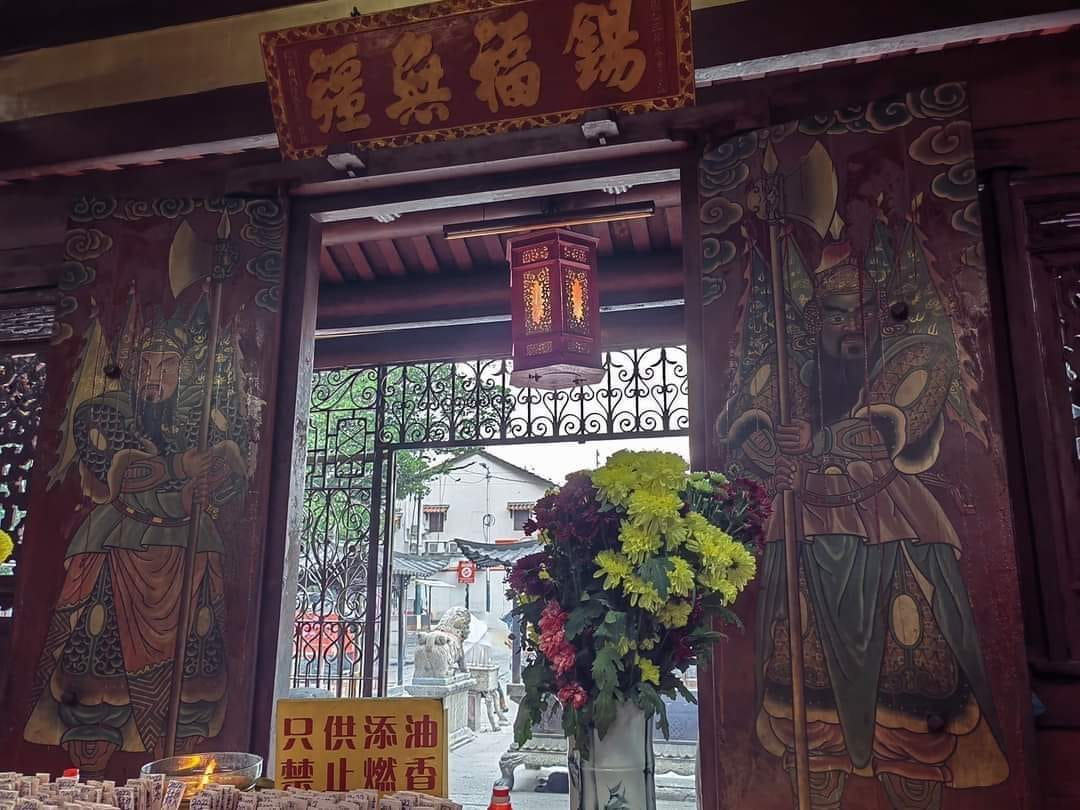
Traditional door guardian paintings (Menshen 门神) at the entrance, with a wooden plaque inscribed “锡福无疆” (Limitless Blessings and Harmony).

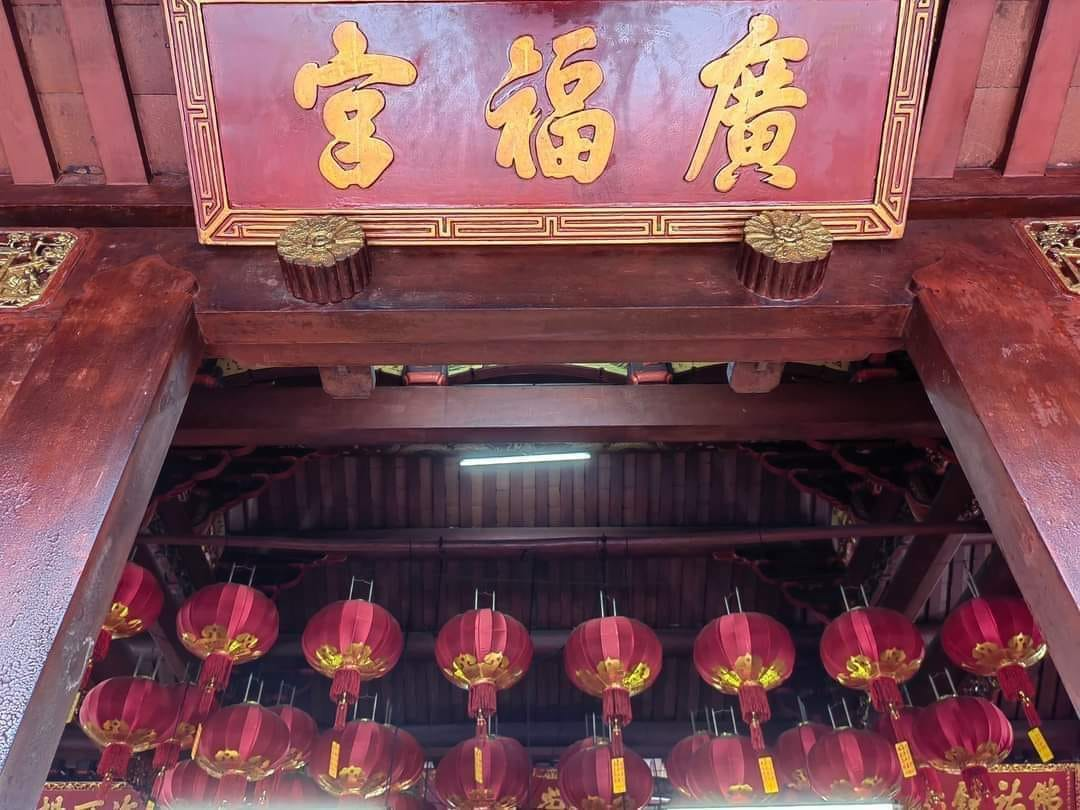
The main signboard reading “廣福宮” (Guangfu Gong) with hanging red lanterns beneath.

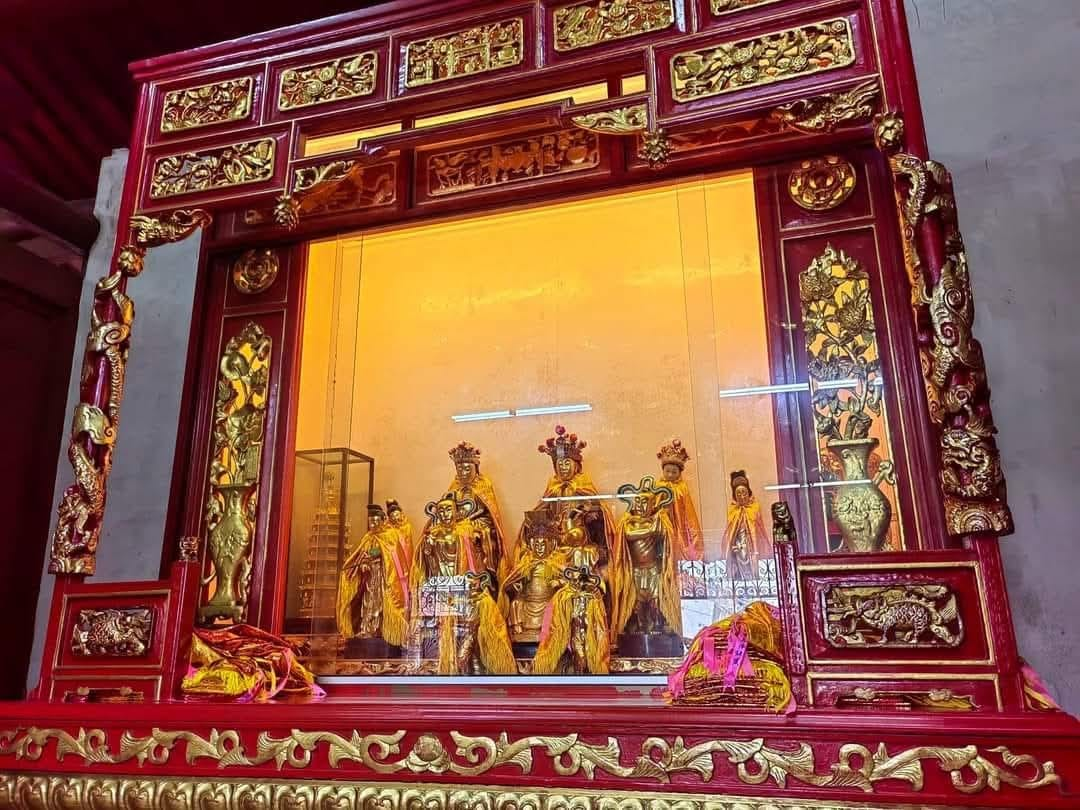
An elaborately decorated shrine housing statues of Guanyin and accompanying deities within the temple interior.

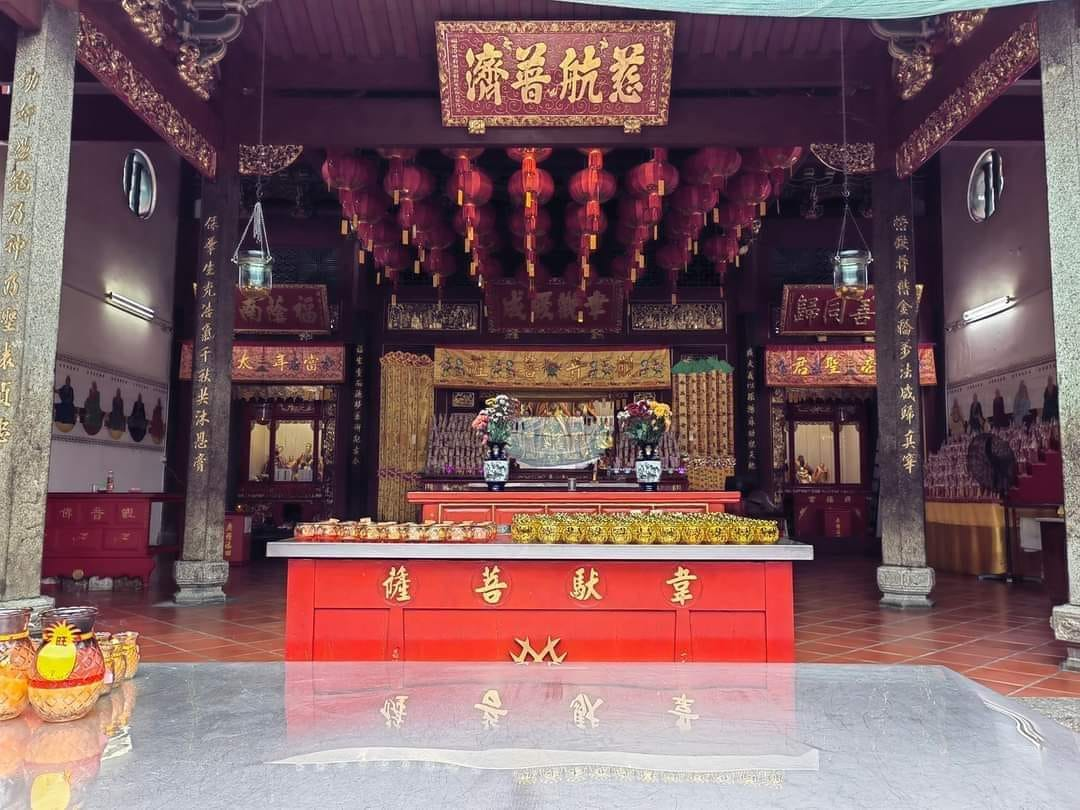
The inner sanctuary of Kuan Im Teng, adorned with red lanterns and central offering tables. The hall enshrines Guanyin and other deities.

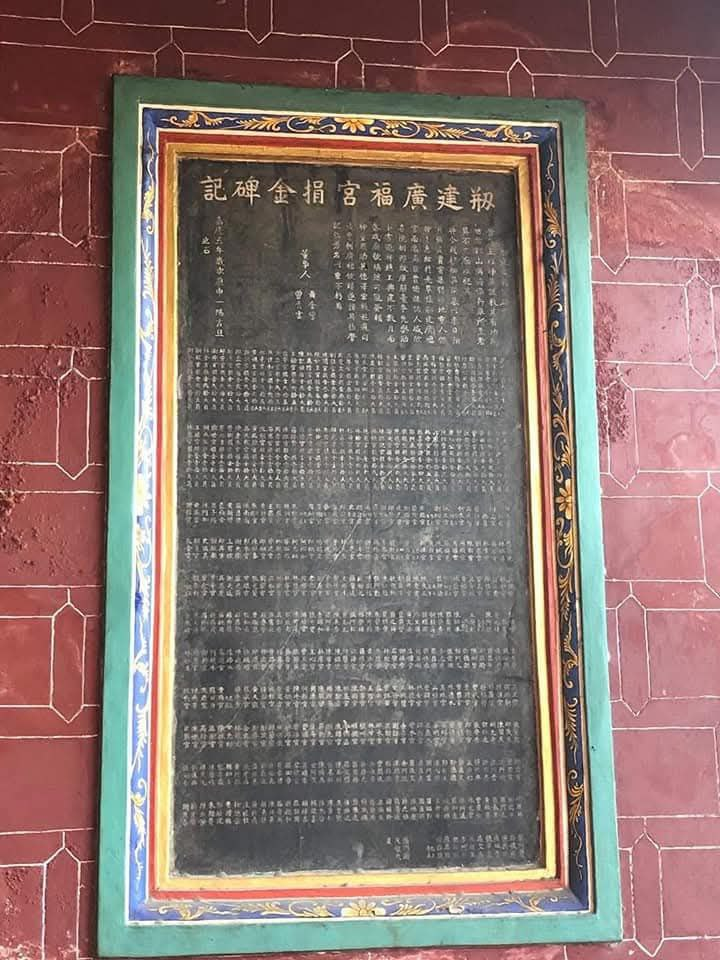
An inscribed stele listing the names of donors who contributed to the expansion of Guan Im Temple in Penang.

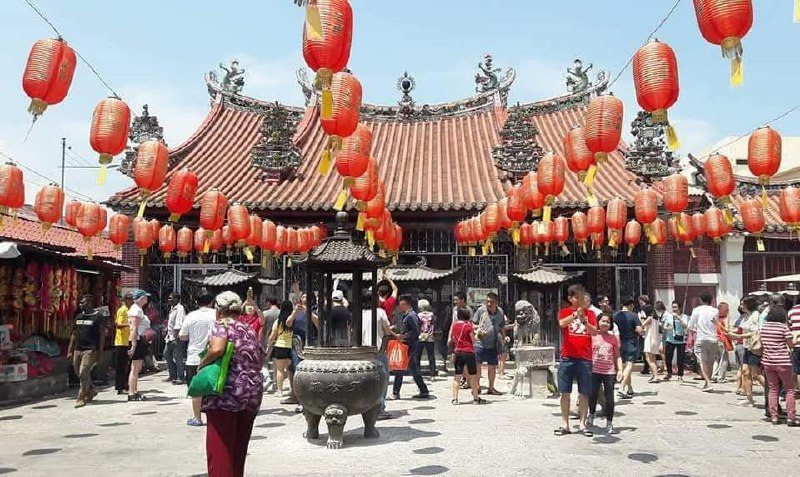
The main courtyard of the Guanyin Temple during Chinese New Year, decorated with red lanterns.

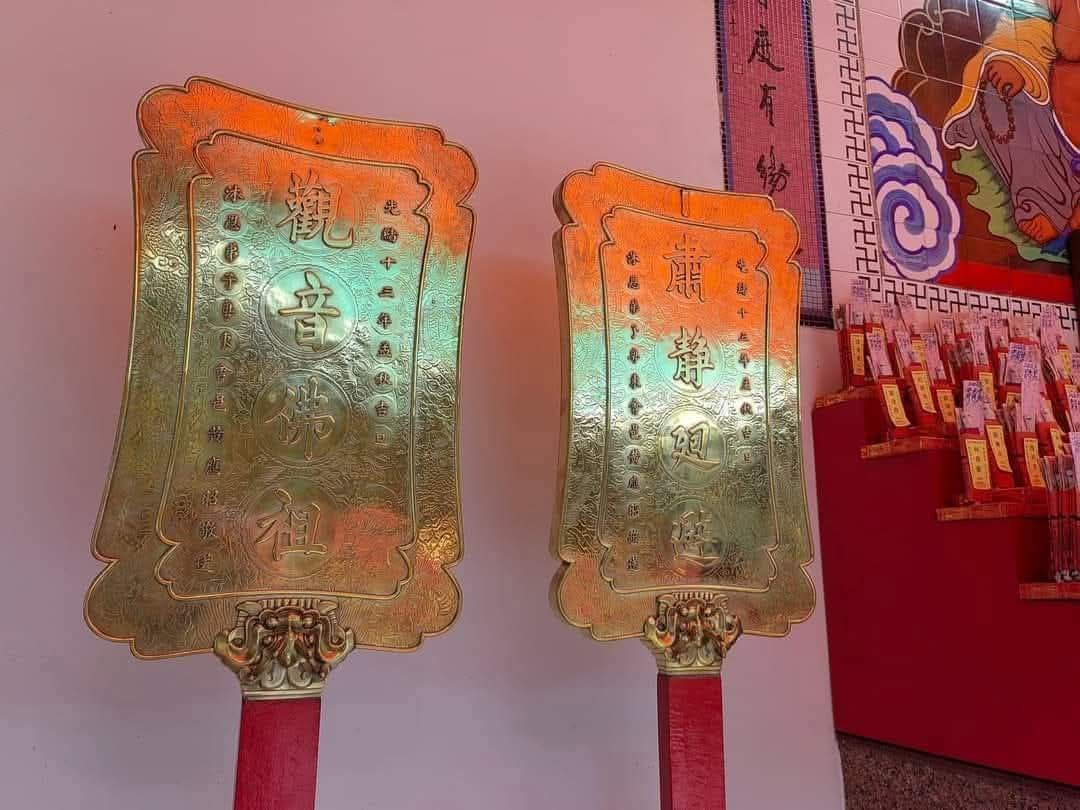
Ceremonial metal plaques used in religious processions, traditionally used to maintain order during rituals.

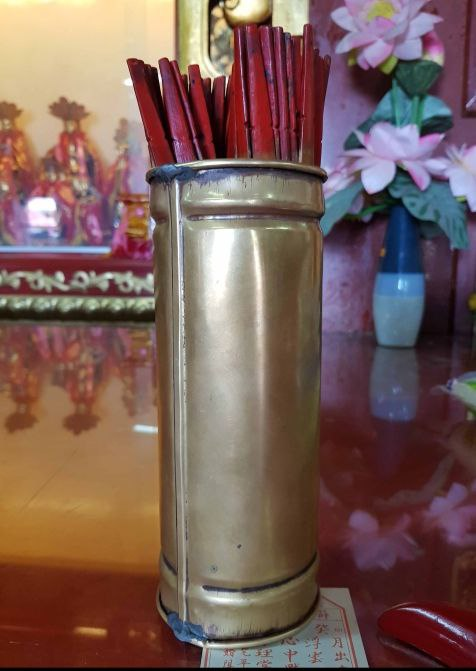
Kau Cim Sticks

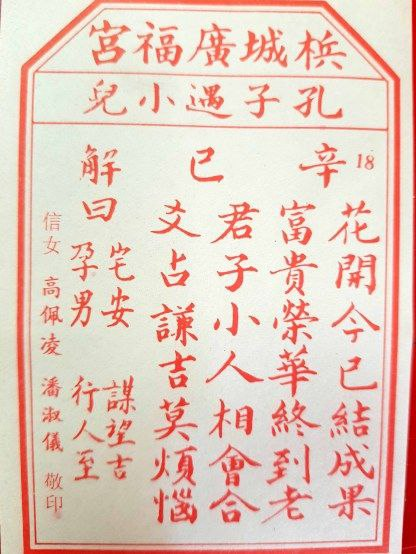
Kau Cim Poem

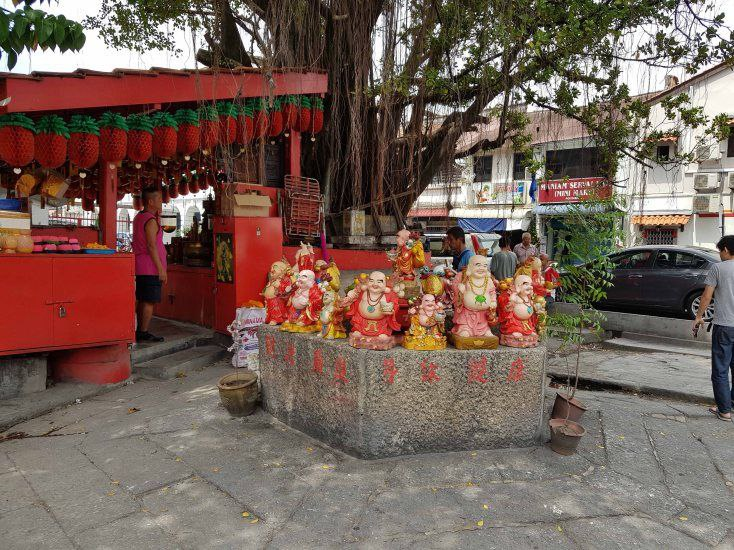
Wishing Well in front of the Kuan Yin Teng Temple, Penang

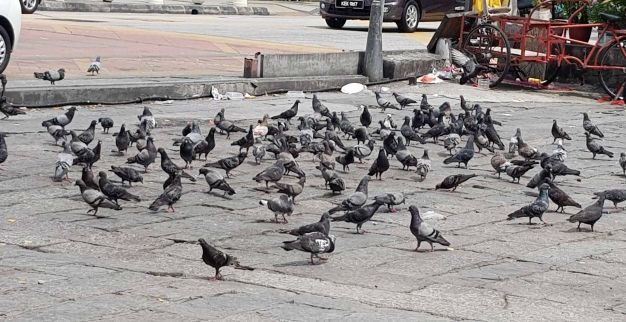
Pigeons in front of the Kuan Yin Teng Temple
