= City Hall, George Town =

City hall in George Town, Penang, Malaysia

City Hall
- Dewan Bandaraya
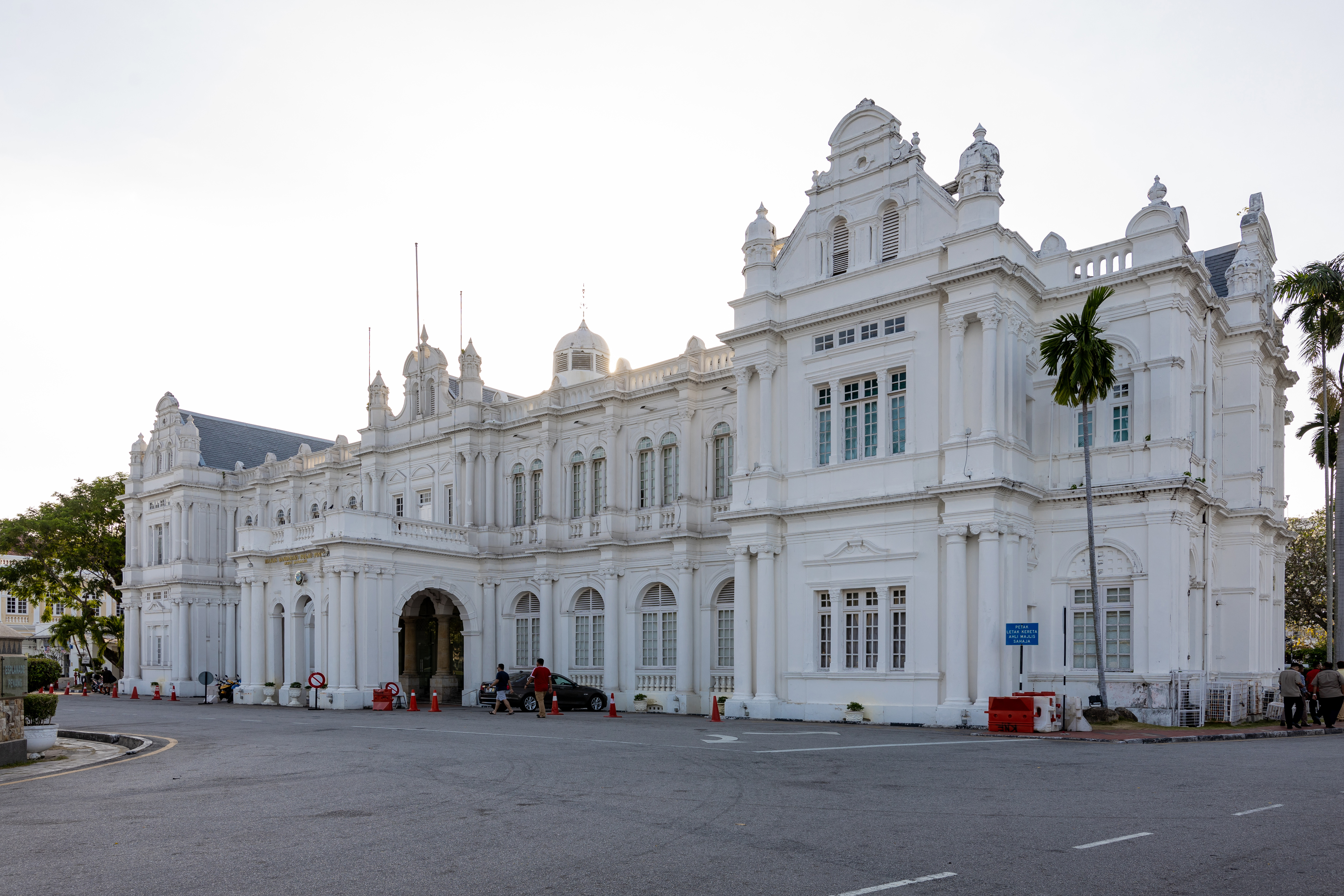
- Interactive map of the City Hall area
- Former names: Municipal Offices

General information
- Type: City hall
- Architectural style: Edwardian Baroque and Palladian
- Location: Esplanade Road, 10200 George Town, Penang, Malaysia, George Town, Penang, Malaysia
- Coordinates: 5°25′19″N 100°20′29″E
- Current tenants: Penang Island City Council
- Completed: 1903; 123 years ago
- Cost: $35,000
- Owner: Penang Island City Council

Technical details
- Floor count: 2

UNESCO World Heritage Site
- Type: Cultural
- Criteria: ii, iii, iv
- Designated: 2008 (32nd session)
- Part of: George Town UNESCO Core Zone
- Reference no.: 1223
- Region: Asia-Pacific

The City Hall is the local government headquarters of George Town within the Malaysian state of Penang. Built by the British, it now serves as the seat of the Penang Island City Council and was previously the seat of the George Town City Council.

Originally completed in 1903 as the Municipal Offices, the building was erected at a cost of $100,000 to relieve the demand for office space at the adjacent Town Hall. The name City Hall dates back to the grant of city status to George Town in 1957.

Both the City Hall and the Town Hall are located at Esplanade Road, overlooking the historic parade ground (the Padang) within the Esplanade. The buildings are also situated within George Town's UNESCO World Heritage Site.

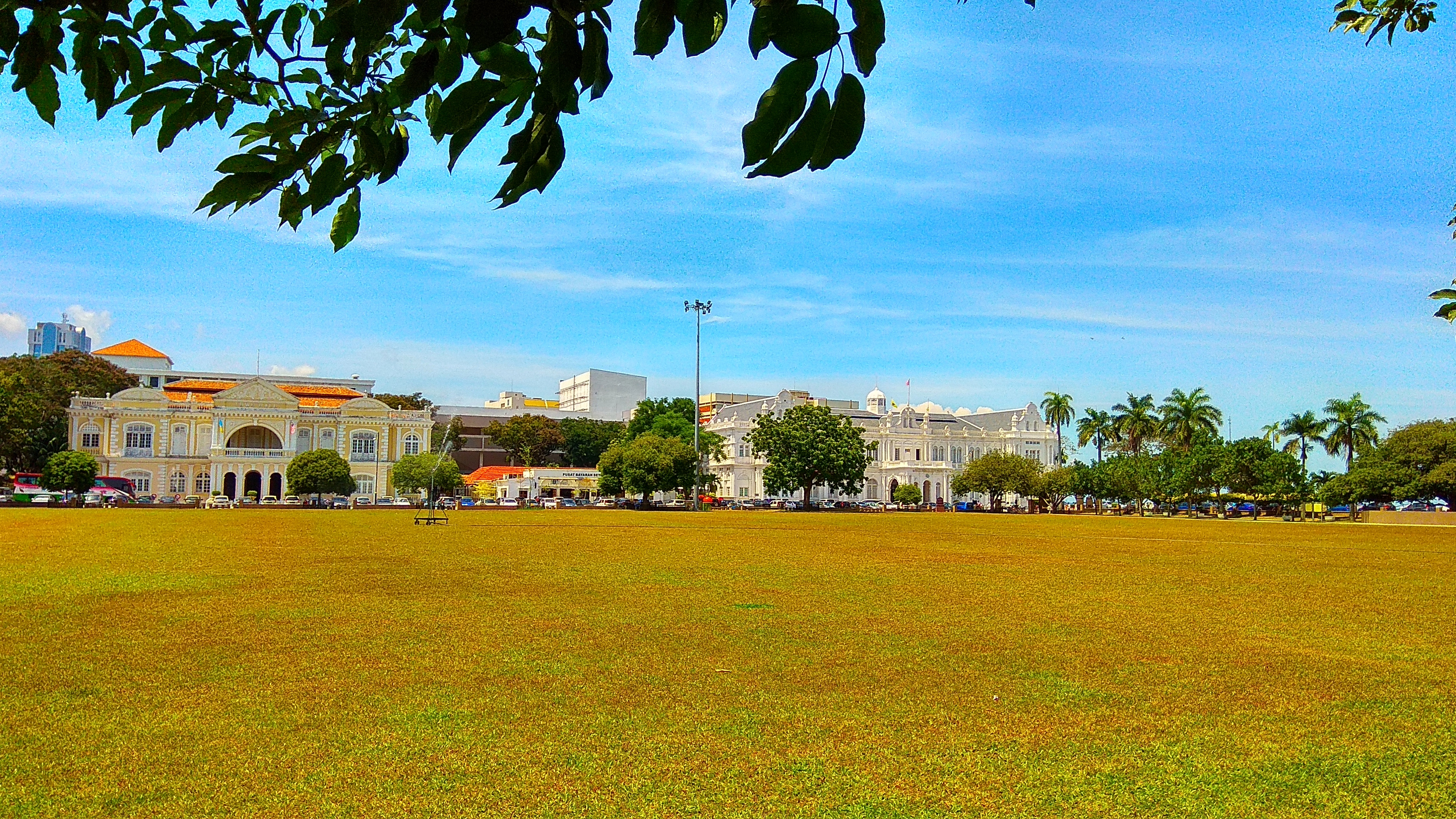
The Town Hall (left) and the City Hall (right) along Esplanade Road, overlooking the Esplanade's Padang.

The City Hall and the Esplanade in the 1910s

== Architecture ==
Completed in 1903, the two-storey building combines Edwardian Baroque and Palladian architectural styles. It has been listed as a national monument since 1982 under the Antiquities Act 1976.

The building was last renovated between 2004 and 2005. Although the City Hall retains much of its original form, the original arcades or loggias on the ground floor have been enclosed with windows.

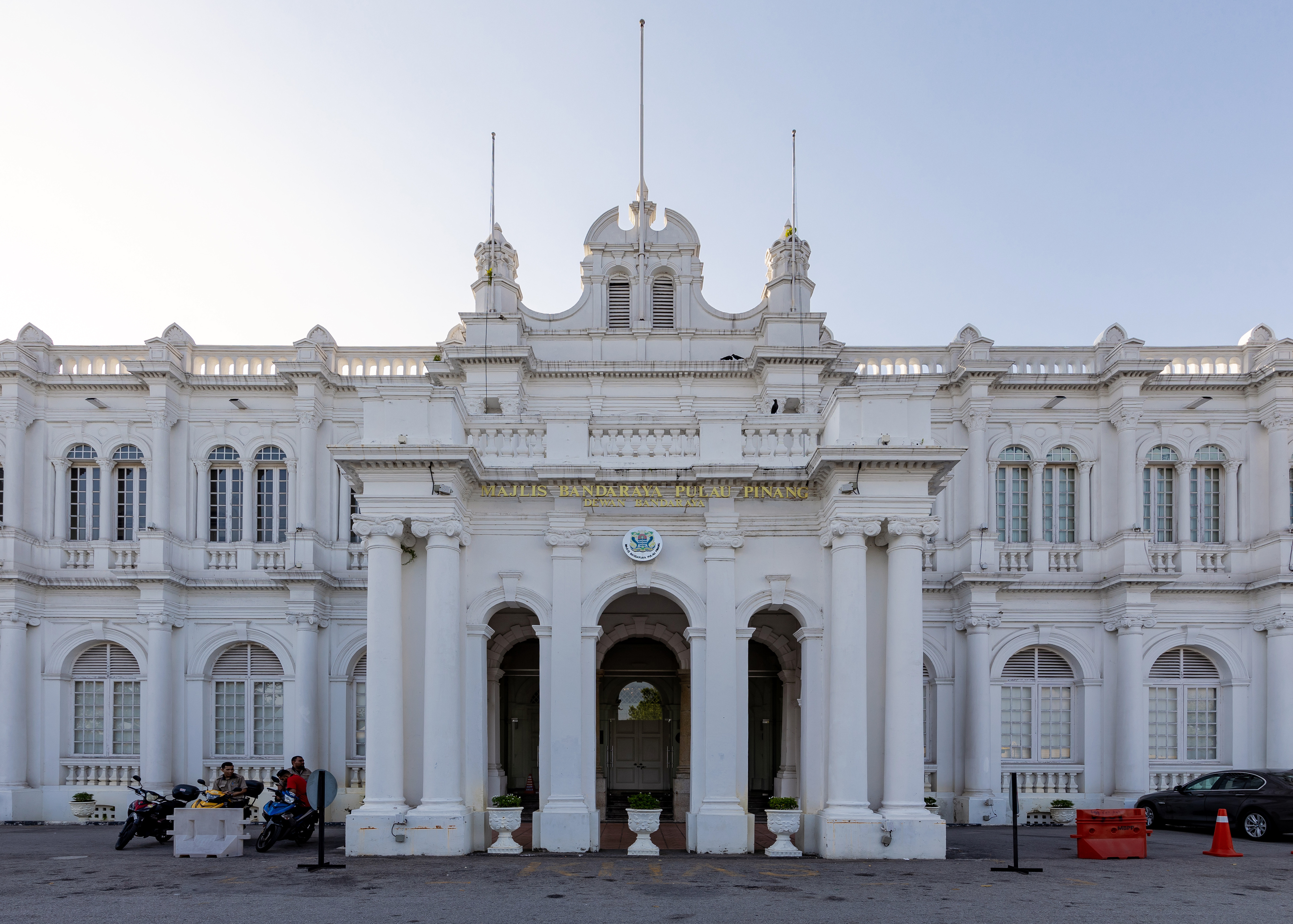
The City Hall is steeped in Edwardian Baroque and Palladian architecture.

== History ==
The history of George Town's municipal accommodations began in 1873, when a proposal to construct the Town Hall was first mooted. The construction of the Town Hall commenced in 1879 and was inaugurated in the following year, making it George Town's first municipal building.

The Town Hall housed the local government for George Town, the Municipal Commission of George Town and served as a venue for social events for the European elite. However, the Municipal Commission soon deemed the office space within the Town Hall to be insufficient. Hence, plans were drawn up for the construction of another municipal building right next door.

Tenders were called for the construction of the Municipal Offices in 1900. Lee Ah Chang, a local ethnic Chinese, won the contract with a bid amounting to $75,400 (Straits dollar). The Municipal Offices was built in the Edwardian Baroque and Palladian styles, which were popular at the time.

By the time the Municipal Offices was completed in 1903, its construction cost had ballooned to $100,000 (Straits dollar). The Municipal Commission of George Town decided to covertly relocate from the Town Hall into the adjacent Municipal Offices, and that no inauguration ceremony was to be held. Since the completion of the Municipal Offices, the Town Hall took on a more social function.

The Municipal Offices held the distinction of being one of the first buildings in Penang to be completely fitted with electric lights and fans.

The Municipal Offices was renamed the City Hall in 1957, when George Town was declared a city by Her Majesty Queen Elizabeth II. Thus, the City Hall served as the seat of the George Town City Council until its eventual merger with the Penang Island Rural District Counci in 1974. Even after the consolidation of the local governments, Penangites still referred to the building as the City Hall.

Today, the City Hall serves as the headquarters of the Penang Island City Council.

== See also ==
- City Tower, Seberang Perai
