= Campuses of the University of Hong Kong =

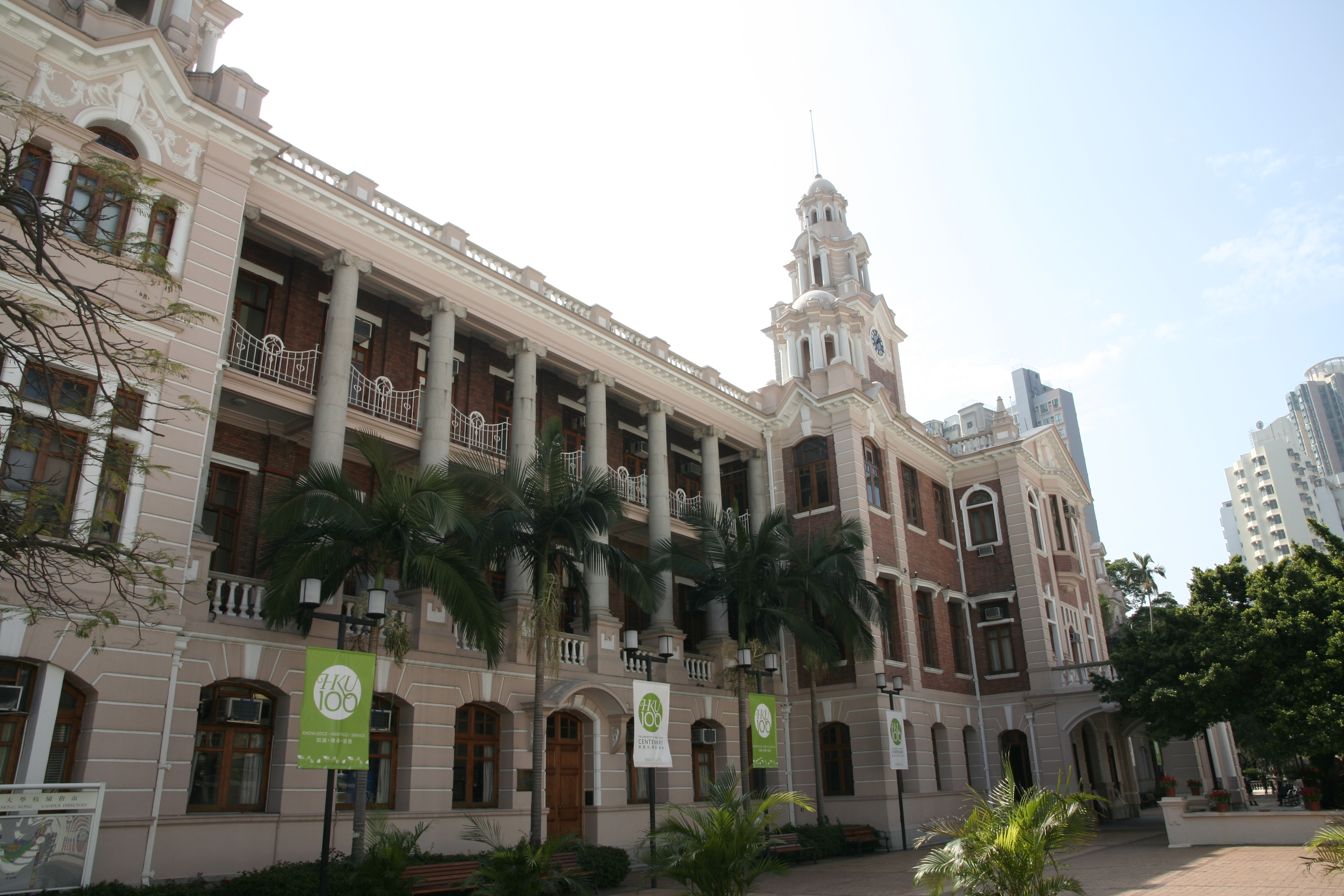
Exterior of the Main Building

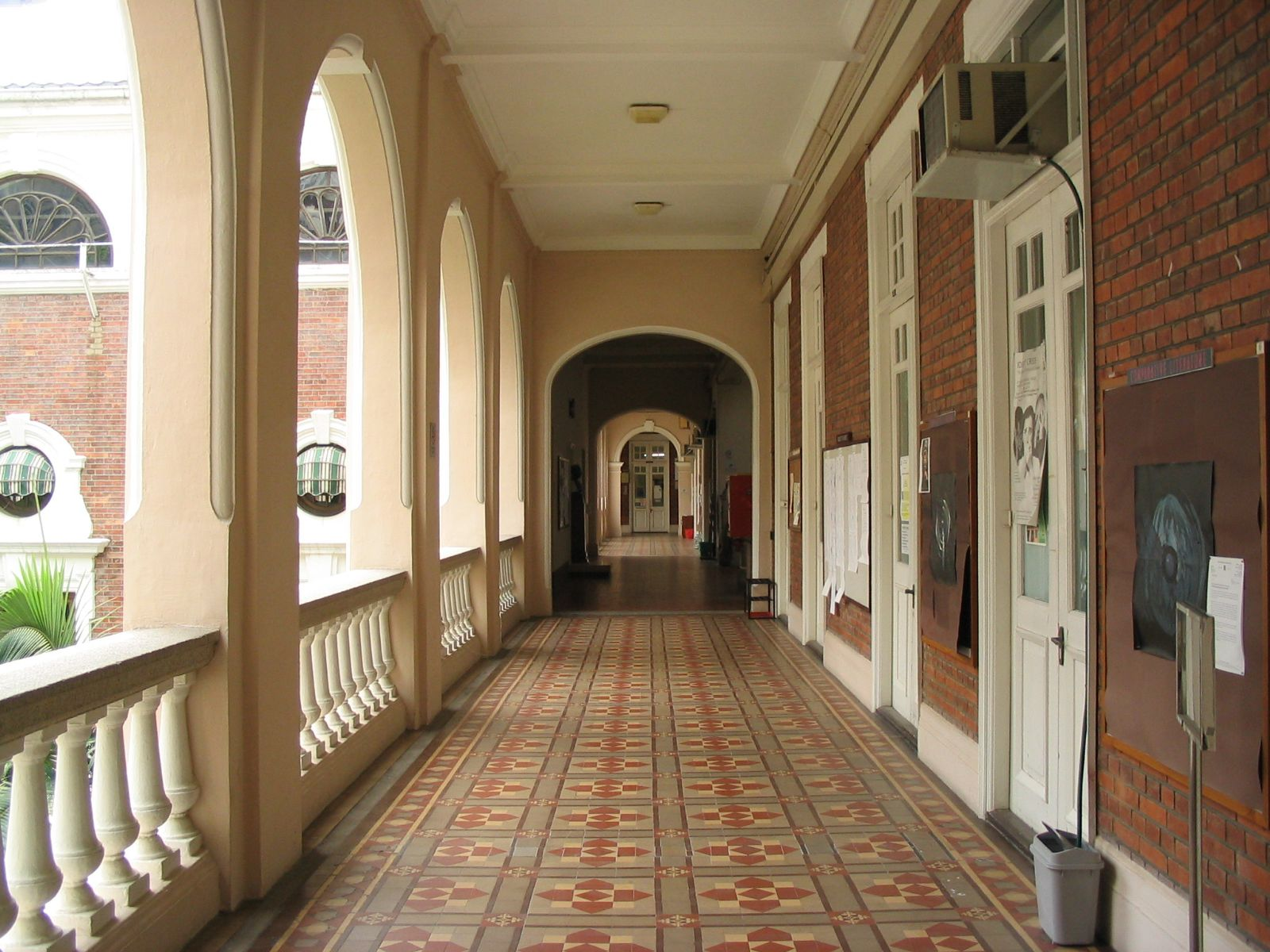
Main Building corridor

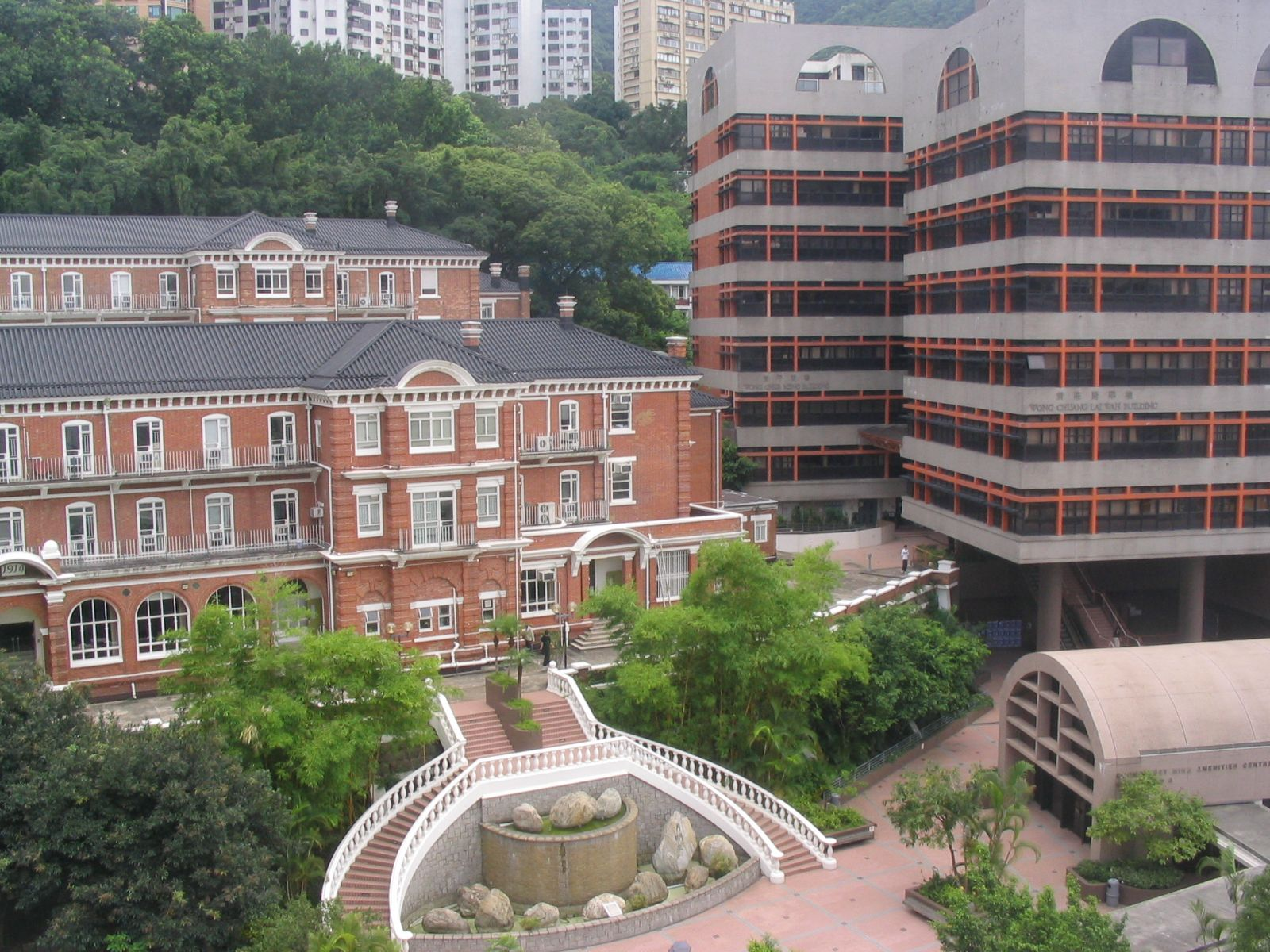
Eliot Hall and Meng Wah Complex

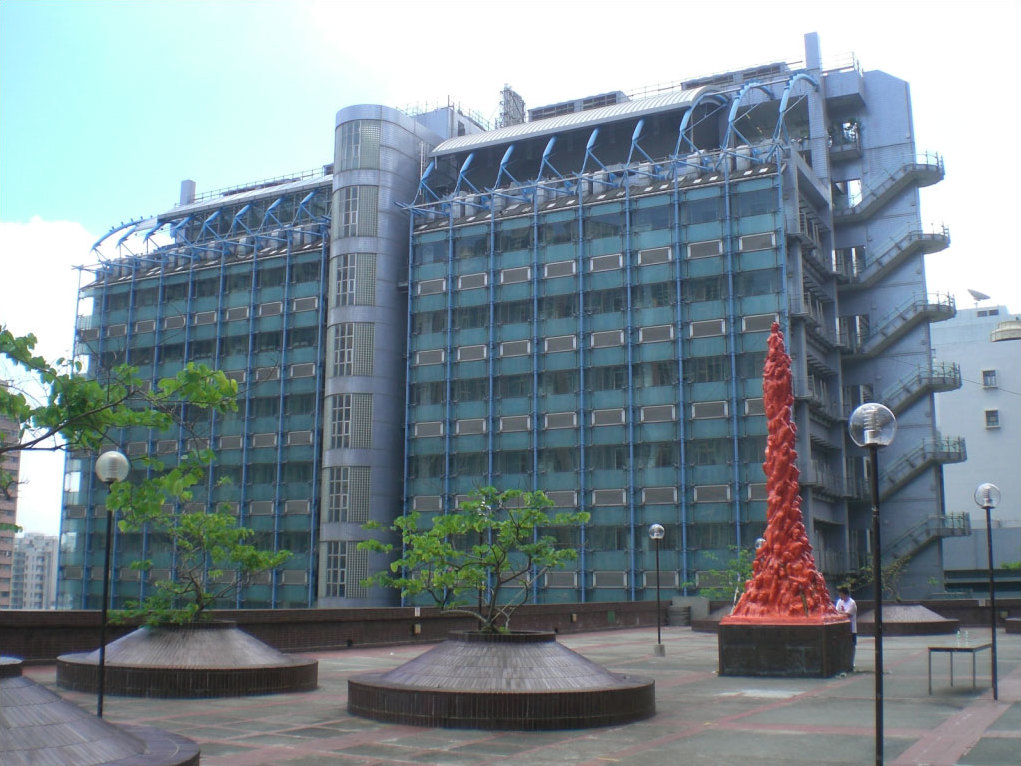
The Kadoorie Biological Sciences Building and the Pillar of Shame

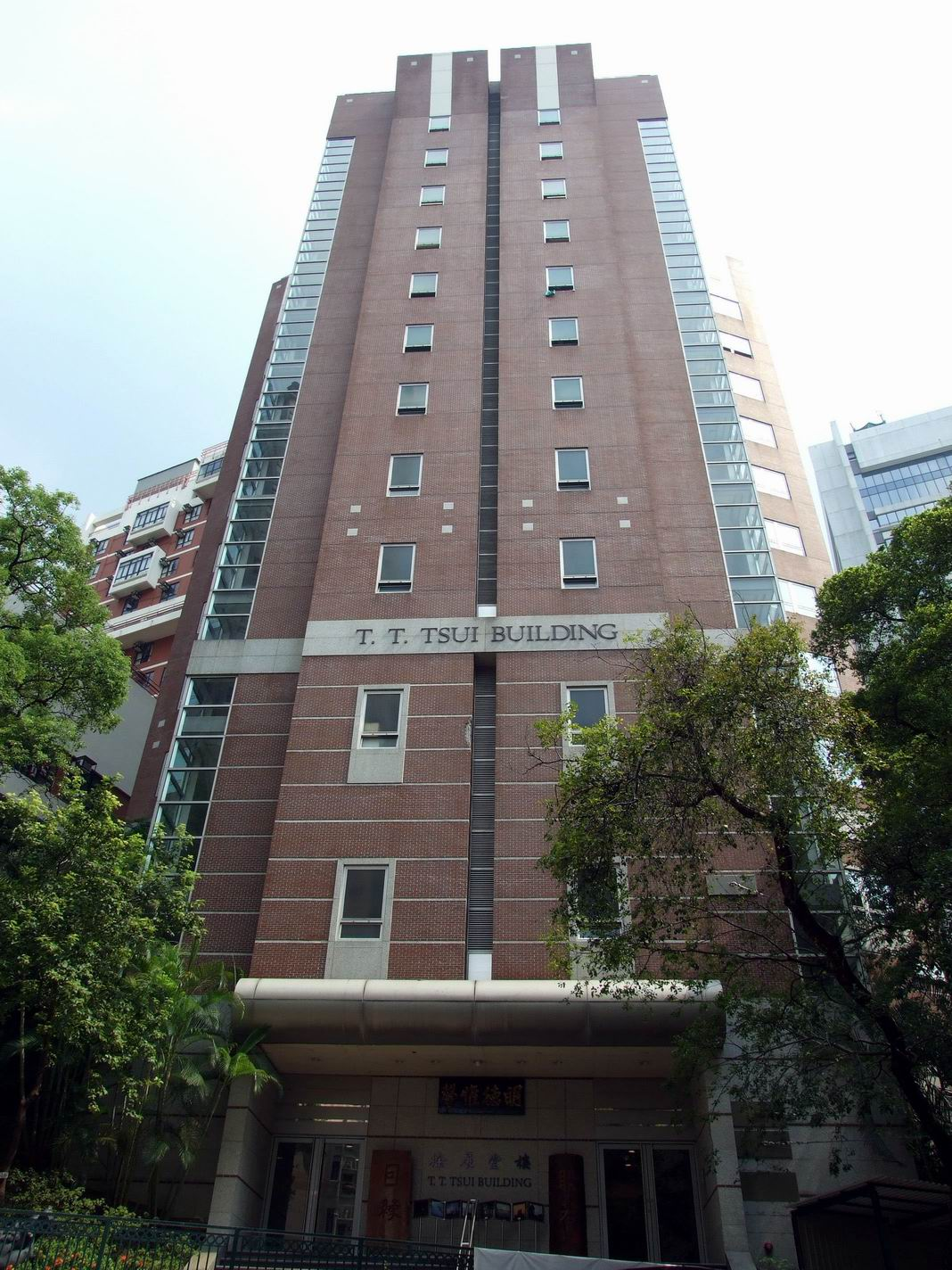
T.T. Tsui Building

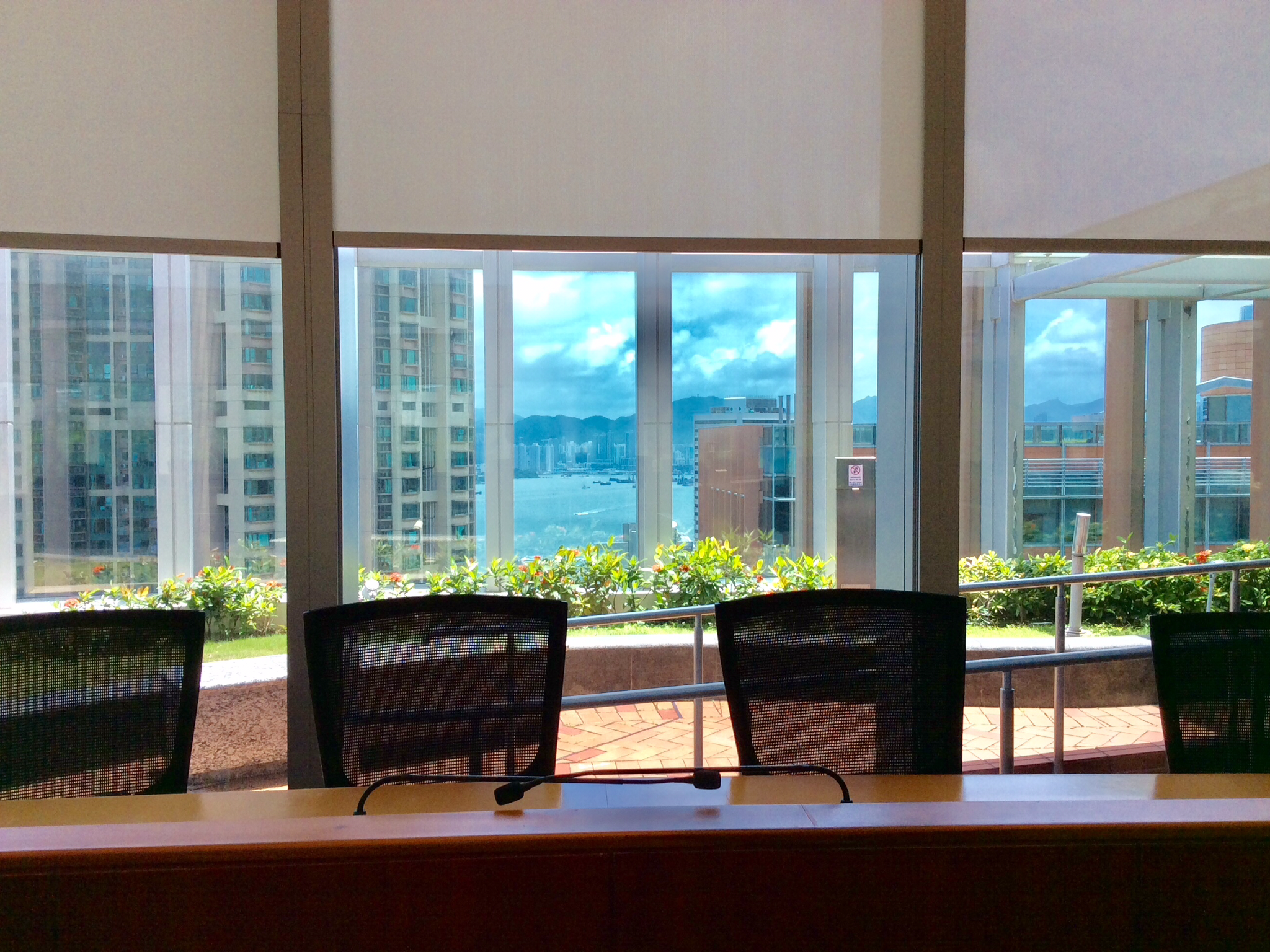
Academic Conference Room of the Faculty of Law at the Cheng Yu Tung Tower on the Centennial Campus with the view of Victoria Harbour

As at 9 December 2020, the university's main campus covers 177,000 square metres (1,910,000 sq ft) of land on Pokfulam Road and Bonham Road in Pokfulam, Hong Kong Island. The official address is “The University of Hong Kong, Pokfulam, Hong Kong’’. Buildings in the main campus include some of the finest heritage examples of British Colonial architecture in Hong Kong. The university lends its name to HKU MTR station, the mass transit access to the main campus, opened on 28 December 2014.

The university has additional campuses in other parts of the Hong Kong Island and the New Territories, as listed below. Since 2022, the university has expanded rapidly to include New Campuses in Shenzhen, China; Shanghai, China; and Barcelona, Spain.

The Li Ka Shing Faculty of Medicine is situated 4.5 km southwest of the main campus, on Sassoon Road in Pokfulam. The medical campus includes Queen Mary Hospital, the HKUMed Academic Building, and the William M.W. Mong Block. The Faculty of Dentistry is situated in the Prince Philip Dental Hospital, Sai Ying Pun.

The university also operates the Kadoorie Agricultural Research Centre, which occupies 95,000 square metres (1,020,000 sq ft) of land in the New Territories, and the Swire Institute of Marine Science at the southern tip of Cape D'Aguilar on Hong Kong Island.

== The Main Building ==
Constructed between 1910 and 1912, the Main Building of the University of Hong Kong is the university's oldest structure and was sponsored by Sir Hormusjee Naorojee Mody and designed by Architect Messrs Leigh & Orange. It is built in the post-renaissance Edwardian Baroque style with red brick and granite and has two courtyards. The main elevation is articulated by four turrets with a central clock tower (a gift from Sir Paul Chater in 1930). The two courtyards were added in the south in 1952 and one floor in the end block in 1958. The building was originally used as classrooms and laboratories for the Faculty of Medicine and Engineering and was later the home of departments within the Faculty of Arts. The central Great Hall (Loke Yew Hall) is named after Loke Yew, a Malayan benefactor of the university in its early years. It became a declared monument in 1984.

== Swire Building ==
In around 1980, the Swire Group sponsored the building of a new residential hall in the eastern end of the campus. Because of the sponsorship, the new student residence was named Swire Building. The building was officially opened by Mr. John Anthony Swire CBE on 11 November 1980. In 1983, the colour orange was chosen to be the hall colour in the second annual general meeting since the colour was used as the background colour during the first open day of Swire Hall and no other halls were using orange as their hall colour.

In 1983, Mrs. J. Lau (Director of Centre Media Resources) provided a design for the hall logo. The Swire Hall Students' Association, HKUSU, then made some amendments to that design. The logo shows the words 'S' and 'H'. The design of the word 'S' looks like two hands holding each other, signifying that all hall-mates should co-operate with each other, and promoting the hall motto 'Unity and Sincerity'.

== Hung Hing Ying Building ==
Financed by Sir Paul Chater, Professor G. P. Jordan and others, Hung Hing Ying Building was opened in 1919 by the Governor of Hong Kong Sir Reginald Stubbs and housed the students' union. After World War II, the building was used temporarily for administrative purposes. The East Wing was added in 1960. The building was converted into the Senior Common Room in 1974. It was named in honour of Mr Hung Hing-Ying in 1986 for his family's donations to the university. The building was subsequently used again for administrative purposes, and housed Department of Music and the Music Library until early 2013. It is currently used by the Development & Alumni Affairs Office. The two-storey Edwardian style structure is characterised by a central dome and the use of red brick to emulate the Main Building opposite. The building became a declared monument in 1995.

== Eliot Hall and May Hall ==
Eliot Hall, named after Charles Eliot, who was the first vice chancellor, serves as an office building. May Hall, named after Governor of Hong Kong Francis Henry May, is also an office building. Eliot opened in 1914 and May opened in 1915. In 1969 Old Halls was formed whilst Eliot, Lugard, and May halls combined. The university razed the Lugard section in 1992, and the remaining sections became the separate Eliot and May halls.

== Hornell Hall ==
Hornell Hall is a hall for male students though it has no dormitories.

== Lugard Hall ==
Lugard Hall was demolished.

== Tang Chi Ngong Building ==
The Tang Chi Ngong Building is on the campus. The idea to establish a school of Chinese was proposed in the inter-war period. Construction of the premises began in 1929 following a donation from Tang Chi-ngong, father of the philanthropist Sir Shiu-kin Tang, after whom the building was named. It was opened by Sir William Peel, Governor of Hong Kong, in 1931 and since then further donations have been received for the endowment of teaching Chinese language and literature. The building has been used for other purposes since the 1970s but the name remained unchanged. At present, it houses the Centre of Asian Studies. This three-storey flat-roofed structure is surfaced with Shanghai plaster and became a declared monument in 1995.

== Dormitories ==
In 2017 the university announced plans to make a new 1,228-student, 17-storey dormitory from pre-made components.

=== Jockey Club student village III ===
Jockey Club Student Village III 賽馬會第三學生村

== Centennial Campus ==
To provide additional space for students under the new four-year undergraduate curriculum the Centennial Campus was built at the western end of the main campus, which was previously occupied by the Water Supplies Department.

The university in 2007 was determining what the new campus would be like. To make space for this campus, the university established new reservoirs in caverns below ground and put the new buildings where the former reservoirs were.

The construction of the campus started in late 2009, and was completed in 2012, the first year of the introduction of the new academic structure in Hong Kong. In 2012, the Faculty of Arts, the Faculty of Law and the Faculty of Social Sciences moved to the Centennial Campus.

== New Campuses Since 2022 ==
In July 2021, HKU Business School announced its new campus in Shenzhen, China.

In October 2025, it was announced that HKU would set up its new campus in Barcelona, Spain.

In March 2026, HKU announced its new campus in Shanghai, China.
