= Hung Hing Ying Building =

Building of the University of Hong Kong

Coordinates: 22°17′05″N 114°08′16″E

- 孔慶熒樓
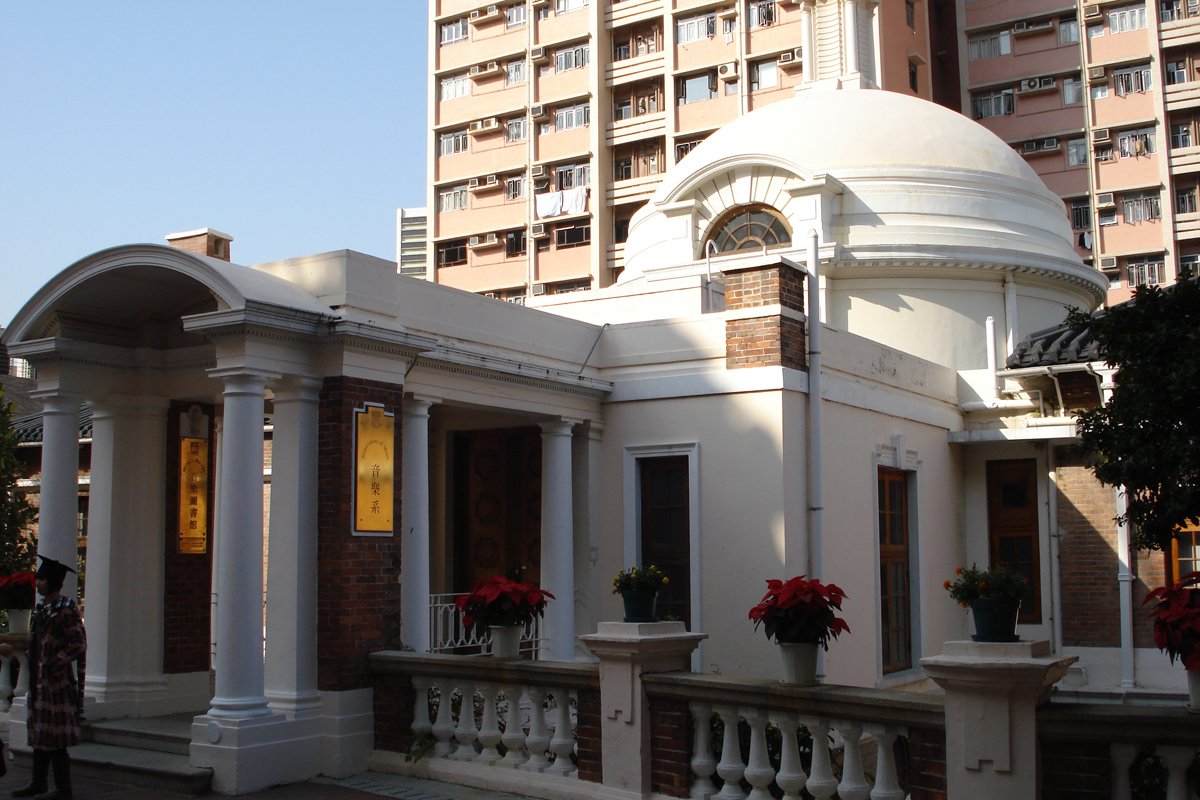
- Interactive map of the Hung Hing Ying Building area

General information
- Type: Academic
- Architectural style: Neo-classical, Edwardian Baroque
- Completed: 1919
- Owner: University of Hong Kong

Declared Monument of Hong Kong
- Designated: 1995; 31 years ago
- Reference no.: 57

Hung Hing Ying Building (Chinese: 孔慶熒樓) is a building of the University of Hong Kong. It is located on the main campus on Bonham Road, opposite to the Main Building of the university. It was built in the architectural style of neoclassical and Edwardian Baroque. The building is two storeys high. It was built in 1919 and was initially named the Union Building. This building has been a declared monument since 1995.

Funds for the construction of the building were financed by Professor C. A. Middleton Smith, Sir Paul Chater, Acting Vice Chancellor Gregory Paul Jordan and many others. It was opened in February 1919 by Governor Sir Edward Stubbs. The building was originally used and designed to accommodate the Students' Union. It was then used for administrative purposes after the Second World War.

An east wing was constructed in 1962, and the building was converted to the Senior Common Room for the university's academic and senior administrative staff in 1974. In 1986, in appreciation of the donations made by Hung Hing Ying towards the university, the building was renamed to Hung Hing Ying Building.

The building was used by the Department of Music from 1996 till 2013, when it was relocated to the Run Run Shaw Tower of the Centennial Campus.
