= Edwardian architecture =

Style of world architecture

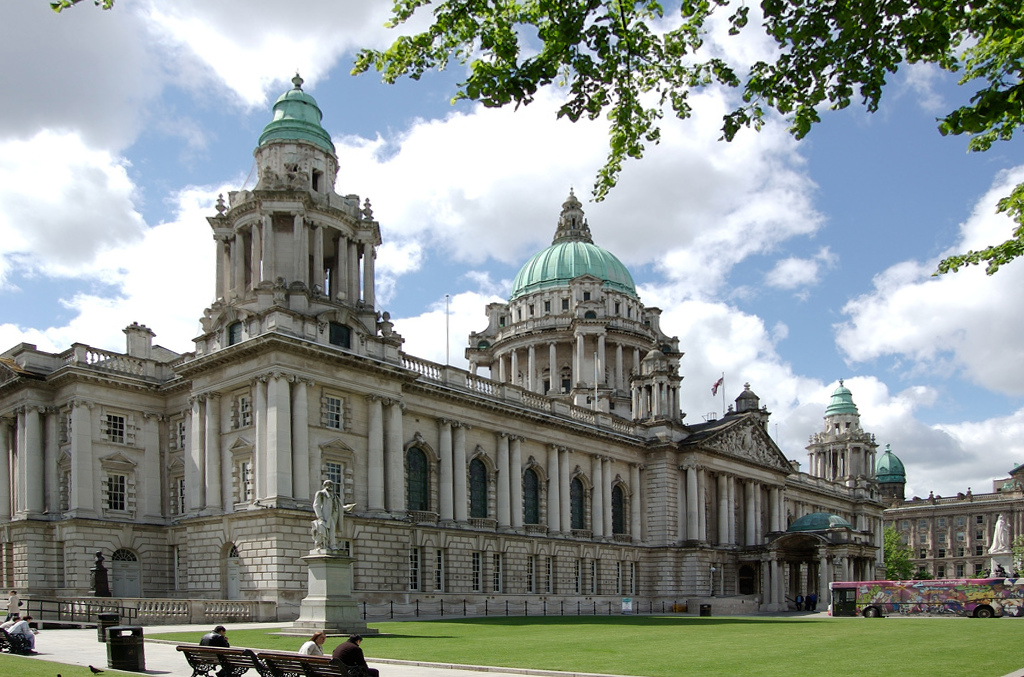
Belfast City Hall, an example of Edwardian Baroque architecture or "Wrenaissance", in Northern Ireland

Edwardian architecture usually refers to a Neo-Baroque architectural style that was popular for public buildings in the British Empire during the Edwardian era (1901–1910). Architecture up to 1914 is commonly included in this style.

It can also be used to mean various styles in middle-class housing, including relaxed versions of Arts and Crafts architecture.

== Description ==
Edwardian architecture is generally less ornate than high or late Victorian architecture, apart from a subset – used for major buildings – known as Edwardian Baroque architecture.

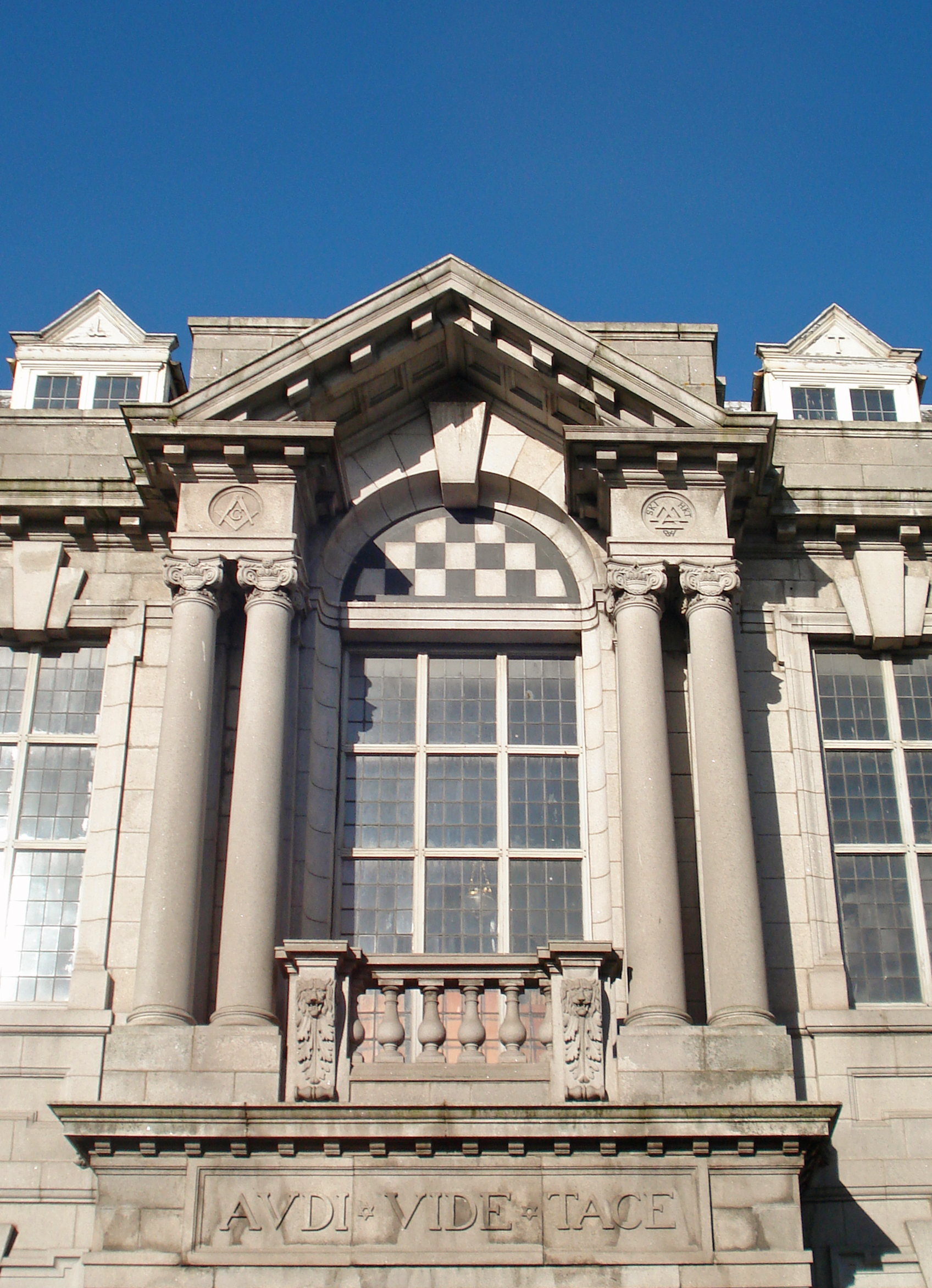
Masonic Temple, Aberdeen, Scotland built in 1910.

The Victorian Society campaigns to preserve architecture built between 1837 and 1914, and so includes Edwardian as well as Victorian architecture within its remit.

=== Characteristics ===
The characteristic features of the Edwardian Baroque style were drawn from two main sources: the architecture of France during the 18th century and that of Sir Christopher Wren in England during the 17th—part of the English Baroque (for this reason Edwardian Baroque is sometimes referred to as "Wrenaissance"). Sir Edwin Lutyens was a major exponent, designing many commercial buildings in what he termed 'the Grand Style' during the later 1910s and 1920s. This period of British architectural history is considered a particularly retrospective one, since it is contemporary with Art Nouveau.

Typical details of Edwardian Baroque architecture include extensive rustication, usually more extreme at ground level, often running into and exaggerating the voussoirs of arched openings (derived from French models); domed corner rooftop pavilions and a central taller tower-like element creating a lively rooftop silhouette; revived Italian Baroque elements such as exaggerated keystones, segmental arched pediments, columns with engaged blocks, attached block-like rustication to window surrounds; colonnades of (sometimes paired) columns in the Ionic order and domed towers modelled closely on Wren's for the Royal Naval College in Greenwich. Some Edwardian Baroque buildings include details from other sources, such as the Dutch gables of Norman Shaw's Piccadilly Hotel in London.

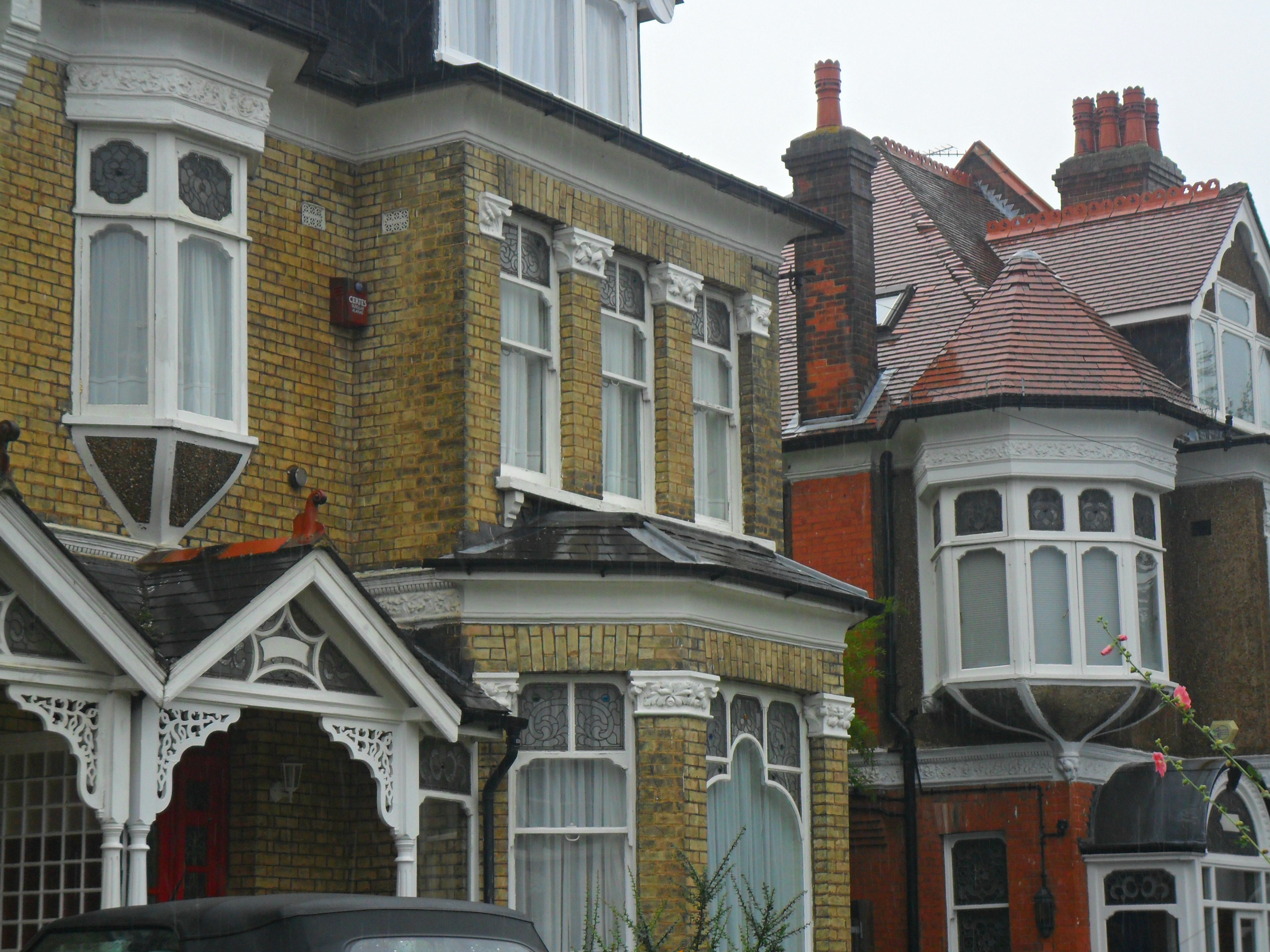
Edwardian houses in Sutton, Greater London, England

Catts Farm, Kingsclere, Newbury, design by H. Launcelot Fedden (1869–1910), as seen in The Building News, July 31, 1908.

Other characteristics include:

- Colour: lighter colours were used; the use of gas and later electric lights caused designers to be less concerned about the need to disguise soot buildup on walls compared to Victorian era architecture.
- Patterns: "Decorative patterns were less complex; both wallpaper and curtain designs were more plain."
- Clutter: "There was less clutter than in the Victorian era. Ornaments were perhaps grouped rather than everywhere."

== Architectural influences ==
- Victorian
- Art Nouveau
- Georgian
- Arts and Crafts
- Federation

== Notable examples ==
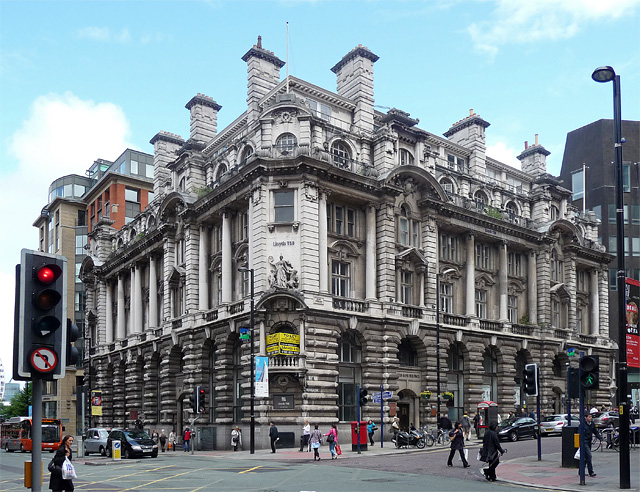
53 King Street, built for Lloyds Bank during 1915.

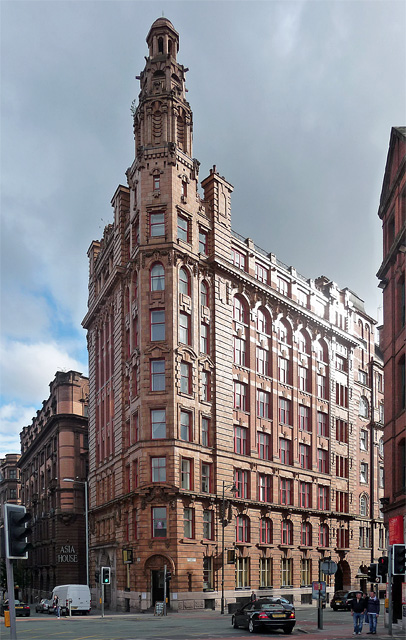
Lancaster House, Manchester, built during 1910.

=== United Kingdom ===
- Admiralty Arch, London (1912)
- Albert Hall, Manchester (1910)
- Albert Hall, Nottingham (1910)
- Arding & Hobbs, London (1910)
- Ashton Memorial, Lancaster, by John Belcher (1909)
- Asia House, Manchester (1909)
- Australia House, London (1918)
- Belfast City Hall, Belfast, by Brumwell Thomas (1906)
- Blythe House, London, by Henry Tanner (1903)
- Bridgewater House, Manchester (1912)
- Cardiff City Hall, Cardiff, by Henry Vaughan Lanchester, Edwin Alfred Rickards & James A. Stewart, (1906)
- Cardiff Crown Court, Cardiff, by Henry Vaughan Lanchester, Edwin Alfred Rickards & James A. Stewart, (1906)
- Central Criminal Court (Old Bailey), London, by Edward William Mountford (1902–07)
- County Hall, London (1922)
- Electric Cinema, London (1910)
- Government Offices Great George Street, London, by John Brydon, (1908–17)
- Granton Gasworks railway station (1902)
- Hanover Building, Manchester (1909)
- Hove Library, Hove (1907–08)
- India House, Manchester (1906)
- Laing Art Gallery, Newcastle upon Tyne (1904)
- Lancaster House, Manchester (1910)
- London Road Fire and Police Station, Manchester (1906)
- Lloyds Bank on King Street, Manchester by Charles Henry Heathcote (1915)
- Manchester Victoria station, Manchester (1909)
- Marylebone station, London. (1899)
- Midland Bank head office building, London by Edwin Lutyens (1922)
- Mitchell Library, Glasgow, William B Whitie (1906–11)
- Municipal Technical Institute, a.k.a. Blackman Tech, Belfast (1906)
- Nottingham railway station, Nottingham (1904)
- 163 North Street, Brighton (1904)
- Port of Liverpool Building, Liverpool, by Sir Arnold Thornely, F.B. Hobbs, Briggs and Wolstenholme (1903–07)
- Ralli Hall, Hove (1913)
- Royal School of Mines building, London (1913)
- St. James Buildings, Manchester (1912)
- South Shields Town Hall, South Shields (1905–10)
- Stockport Town Hall, Stockport, by Brumwell Thomas (1908)
- War Office, London (1906)
- Westminster Central Hall, by Henry Vaughan Lanchester, Edwin Alfred Rickards & James A. Stewart, London (1911)

=== Argentina ===
- Thompson Muebles Ltd, Buenos Aires (1914)
- Harrods - Bs.As. Ltd, Buenos Aires (1914)
- Retiro Mitre railway station, Buenos Aires (1915)

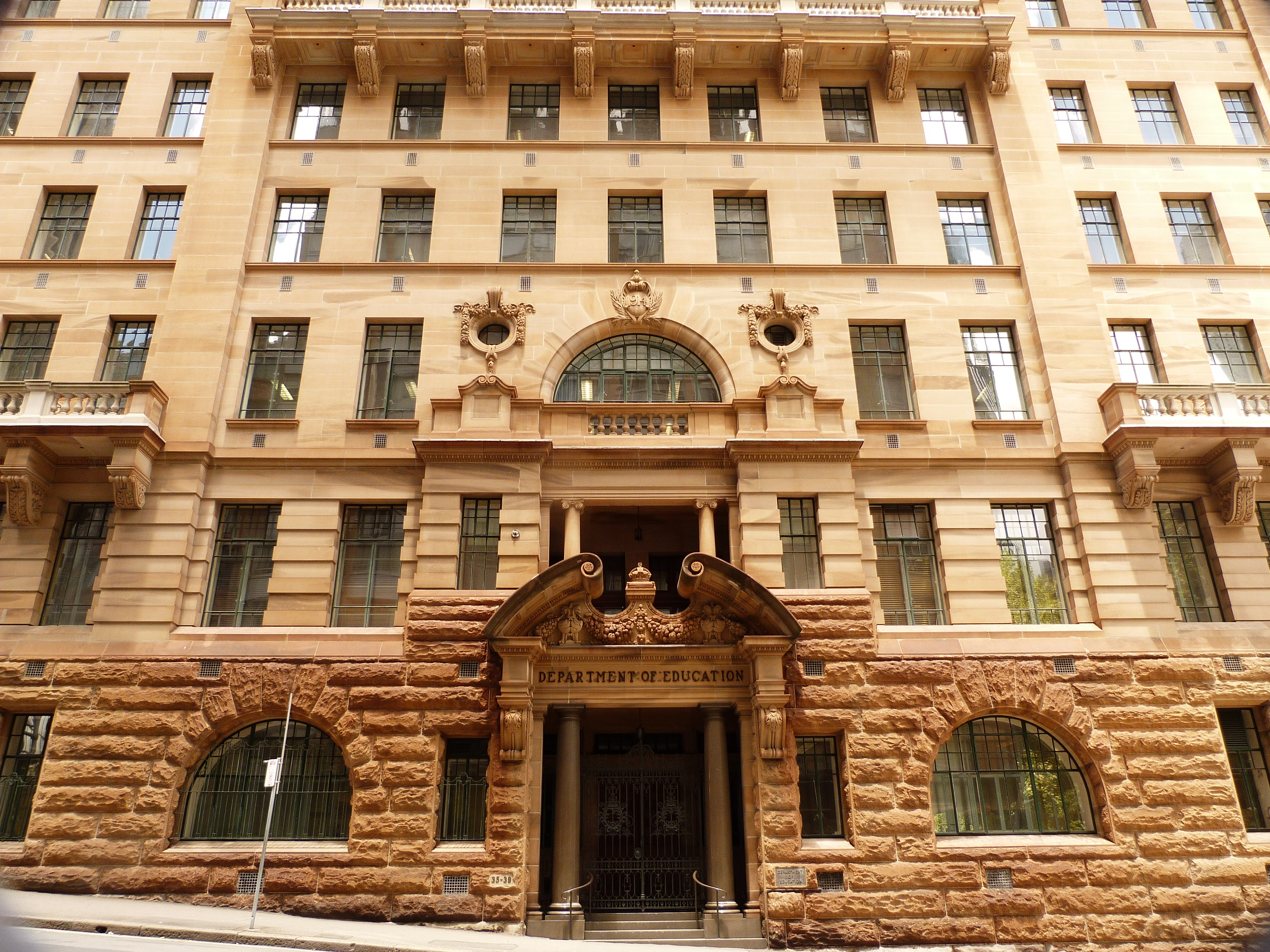
Department of Education Building, Sydney

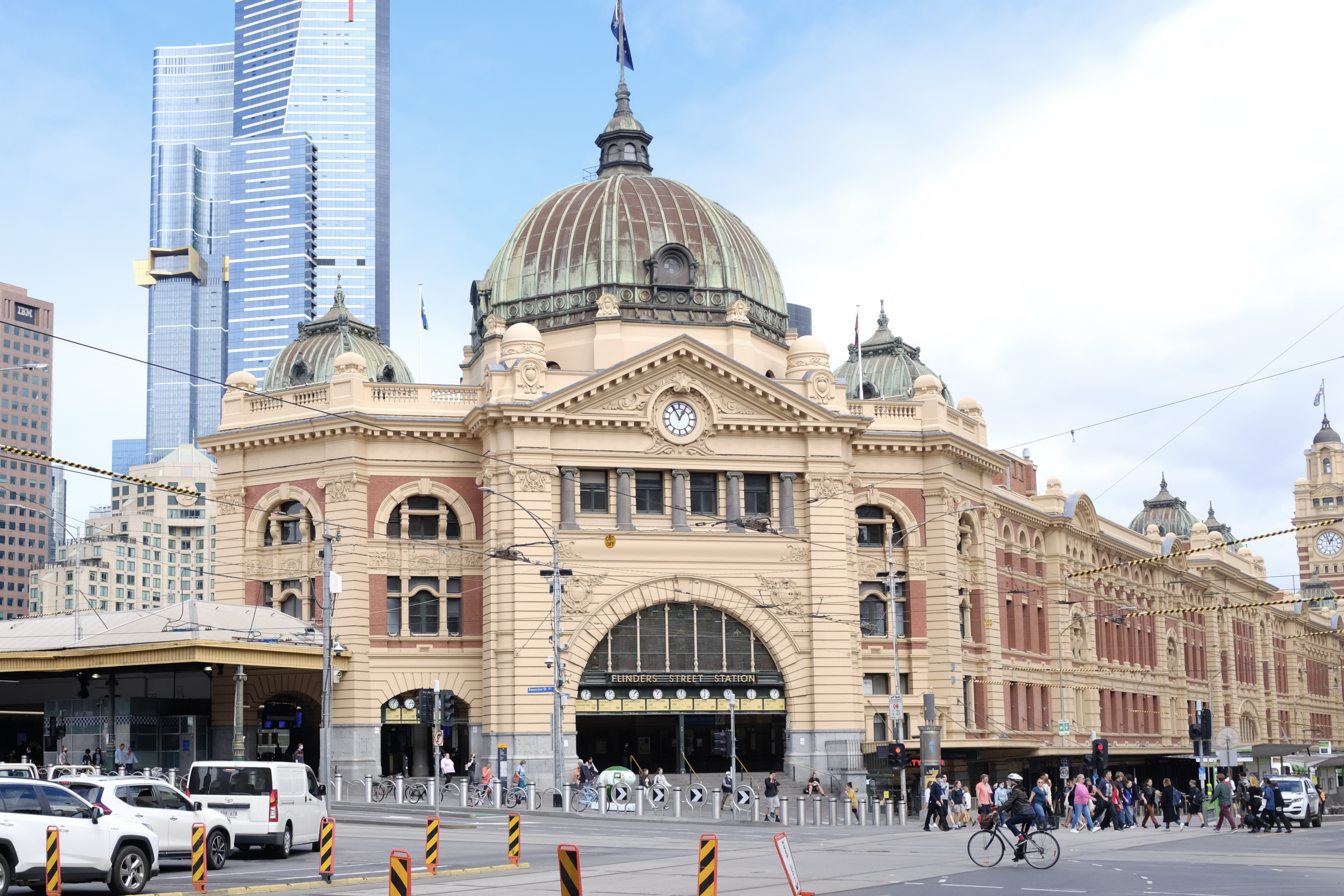
Flinders Street station, Melbourne

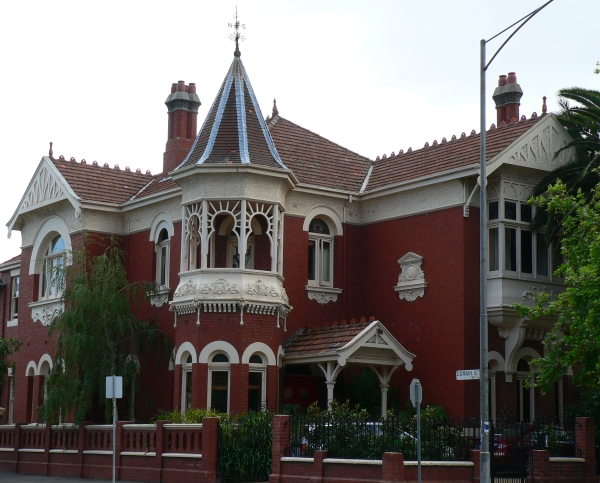
An Edwardian residence in South Yarra, Melbourne

=== Australia ===
- Lands Administration Building, Brisbane (1905)
- Queen Victoria Hospital, Melbourne (main pavilion, now Queen Victoria Women's Centre, (1910–1916)
- Commonwealth Offices, Treasury Place, Melbourne
- Central railway station, Sydney (1906)
- Department of Education Building, Sydney (1912)
- General Post Office, Hobart (1905)
- Flinders Street railway station, Melbourne (1909)
- Warwillah Mansion, 572 St Kilda Road (1896)
- Sydney Hospital, Sydney (1894)
- State Library of New South Wales, Sydney (1905–1910)
- Art Gallery of New South Wales (1897–1909)
- Thomas Walker Convalescent Hospital Buildings, Sydney (1893)
- Taronga Zoo, Sydney (1916)
- Adelaide railway station (1926)
- Perth Institute of Contemporary Arts (1896)
- His Majesty's Theatre, Perth (1904)
- Former Bank of Australasia, Sydney (1904)
- ASN Co Building, Sydney (1885)
- Prahran Market, Melbourne (1891)
- Downing Centre, Sydney (1908)
- Santa Sabina College, Sydney (1894)
- Railway Institute Building, Sydney (1898)
- City Baths, Melbourne (1904)
- Old Museum Building, Brisbane (1891)
- Registrar-General's building, Sydney (1913)
- Exchange Hotel, Kalgoorlie (1900)
- People's Palace, Brisbane (1901)
- Observer Hotel, Sydney (1908)
- International House, Sydney (1913)
- York Hotel, Kalgoorlie (1901)

=== Canada ===
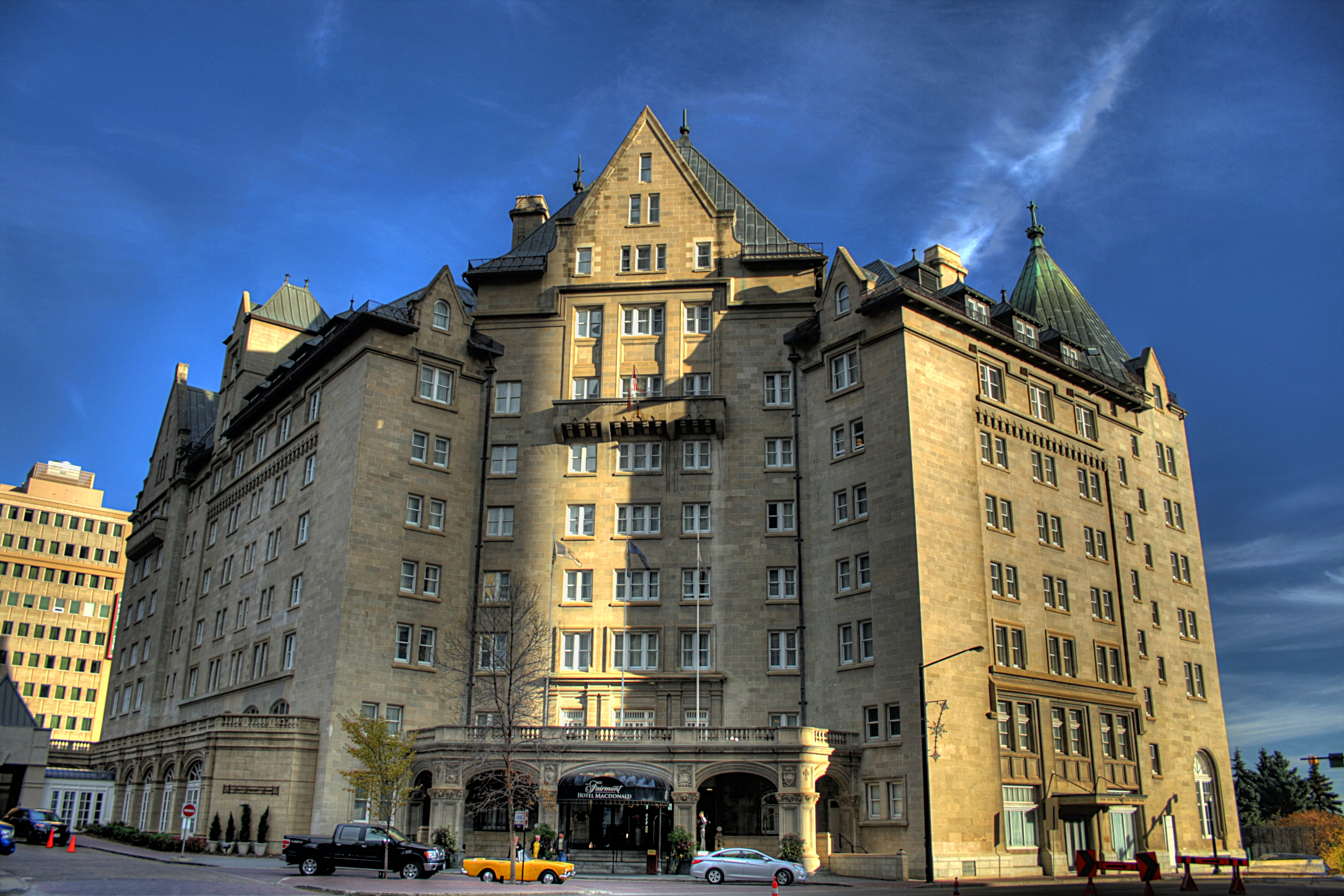
Hotel Macdonald

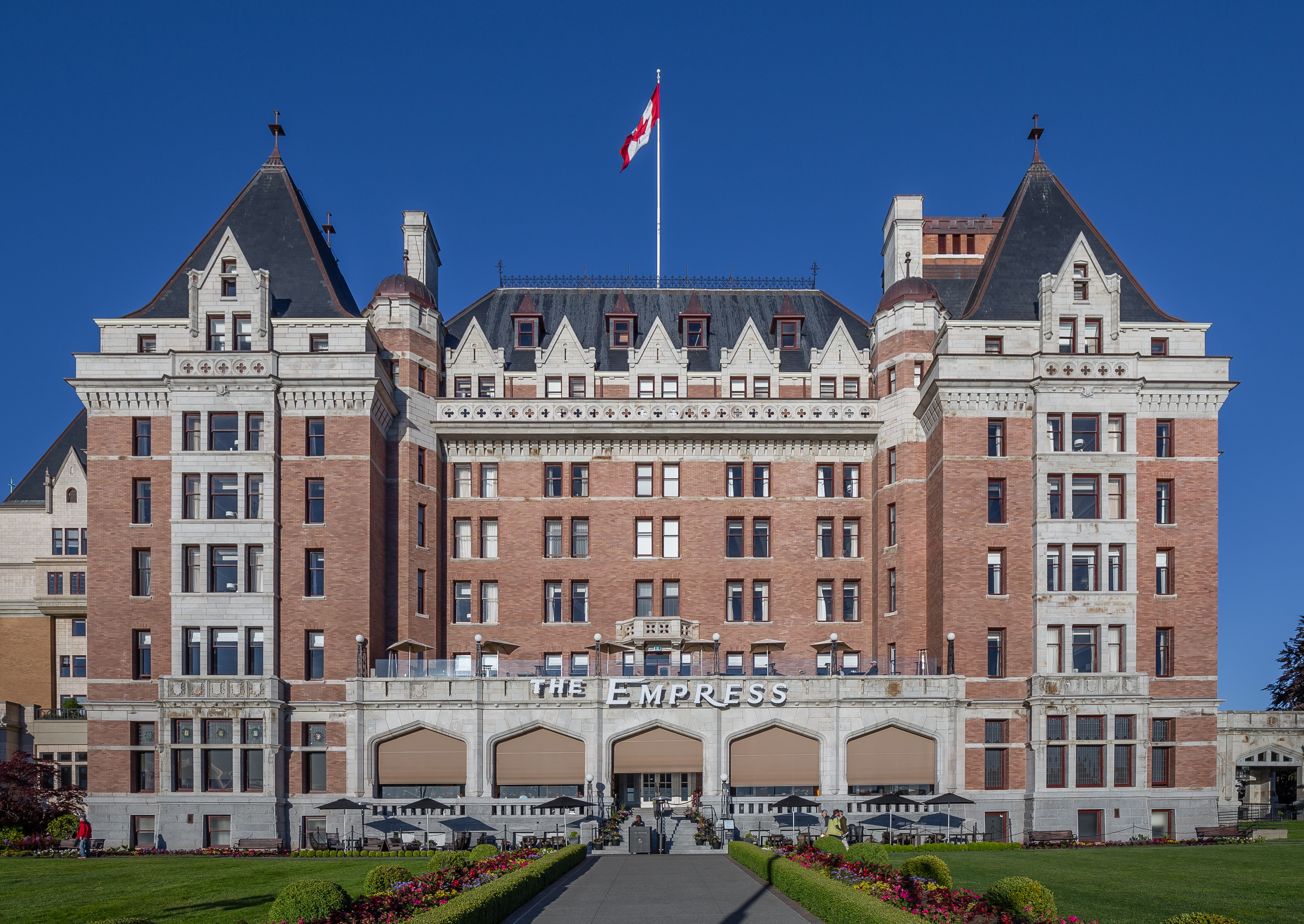
The Empress Hotel

- Birkbeck Building, Toronto
- Château Laurier, Ottawa
- Confederation Building, Winnipeg
- Digby Pines, Digby
- Dominion Building, Vancouver
- Flavelle House, Toronto
- Flatiron Building (Lacombe, Alberta), Lacombe
- Ford Motor Company of Canada warehouse, Calgary
- Fort Garry Hotel, Winnipeg
- Hotel Macdonald, Edmonton
- King Edward Hotel, Toronto
- Palliser Hotel, Calgary
- Post Office (now part of Sinclair Centre), Vancouver
- Sun Tower, Vancouver
- The Empress, Victoria
- Thunder Bay Historical Museum, Thunder Bay

=== Hong Kong ===
Victoria City

- The Main Building of The University of Hong Kong
- Ohel Leah Synagogue
- Old Dairy Farm Depot
- Western Market North Block
- Old Supreme Court Building
- Old Pathological Institute
- King's College
- Dr Catherine Woo Wing, St. Paul's Girls' College

Kowloon

- Old Yau Ma Tei Police Station
- Old Kowloon Station and the Clock Tower

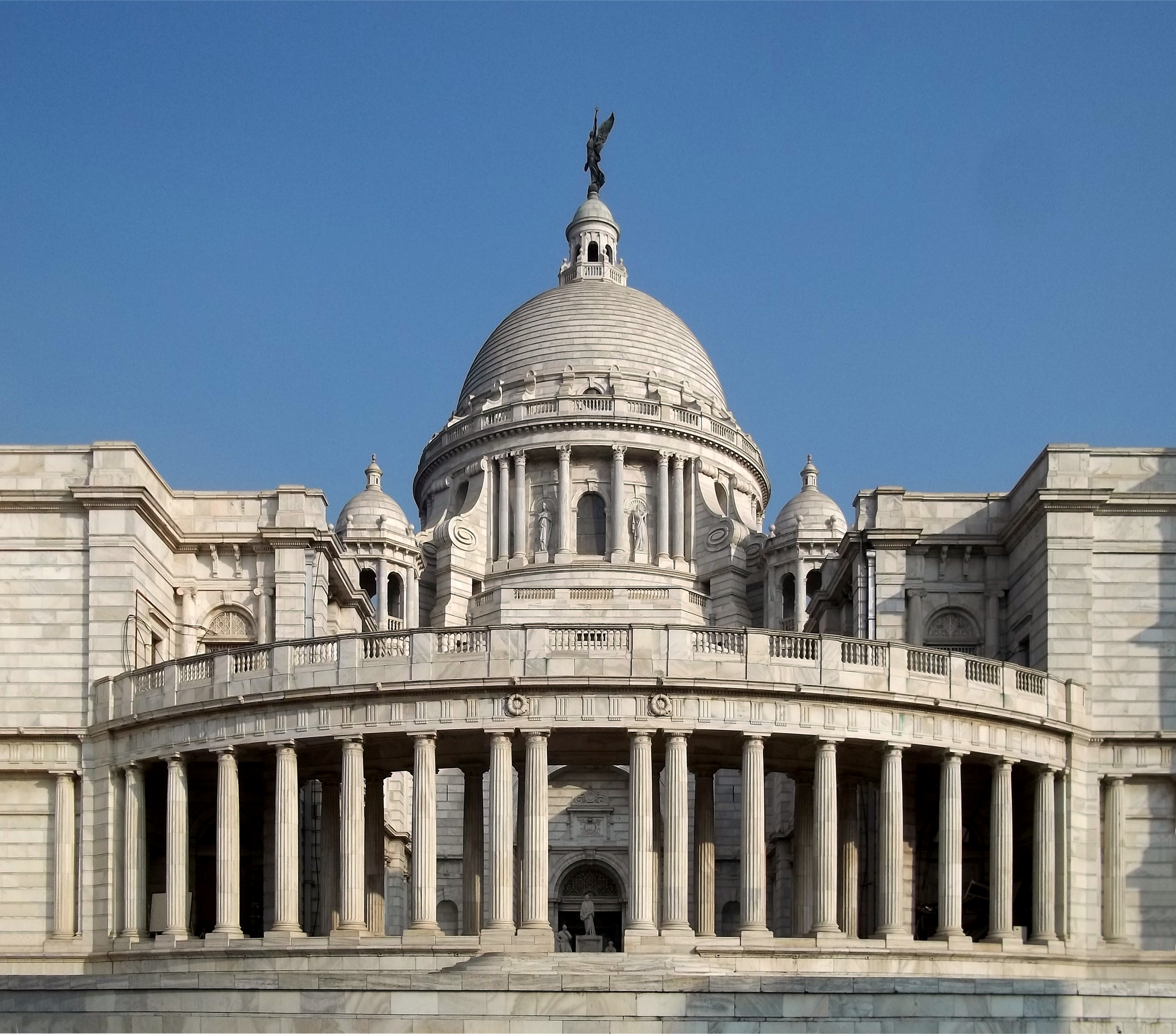
The Victoria Memorial, an example of Edwardian Baroque with Indo-Saracenic influences in Queensway, Calcutta

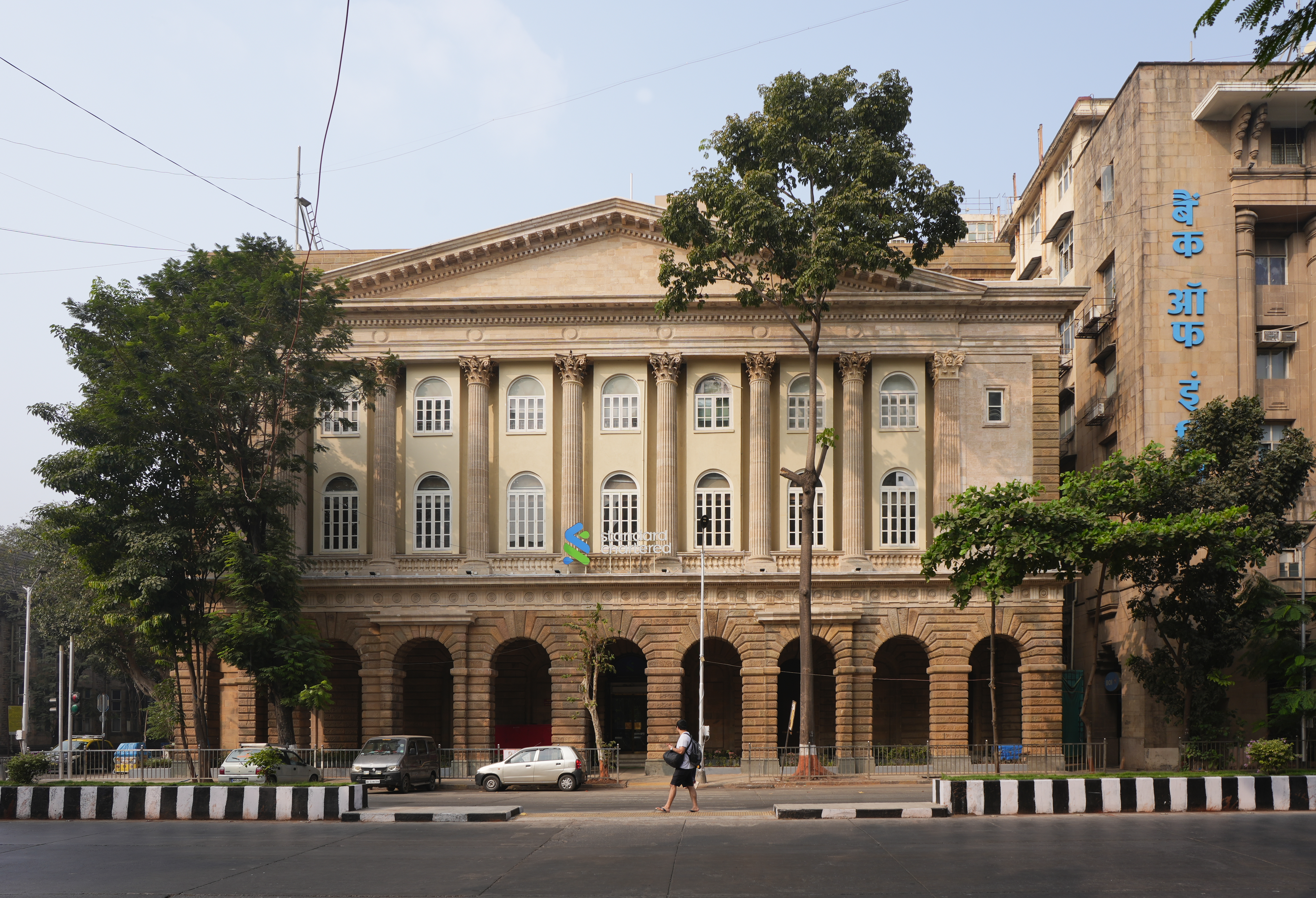
The Standard Chartered Buildings (Grindlays Bank) in Esplanade, Bombay

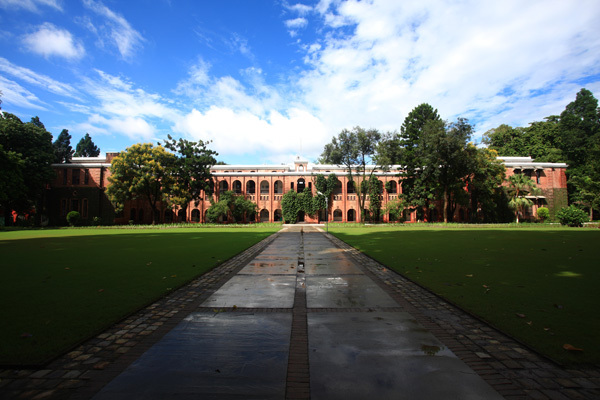
The Doon School, Dehradun

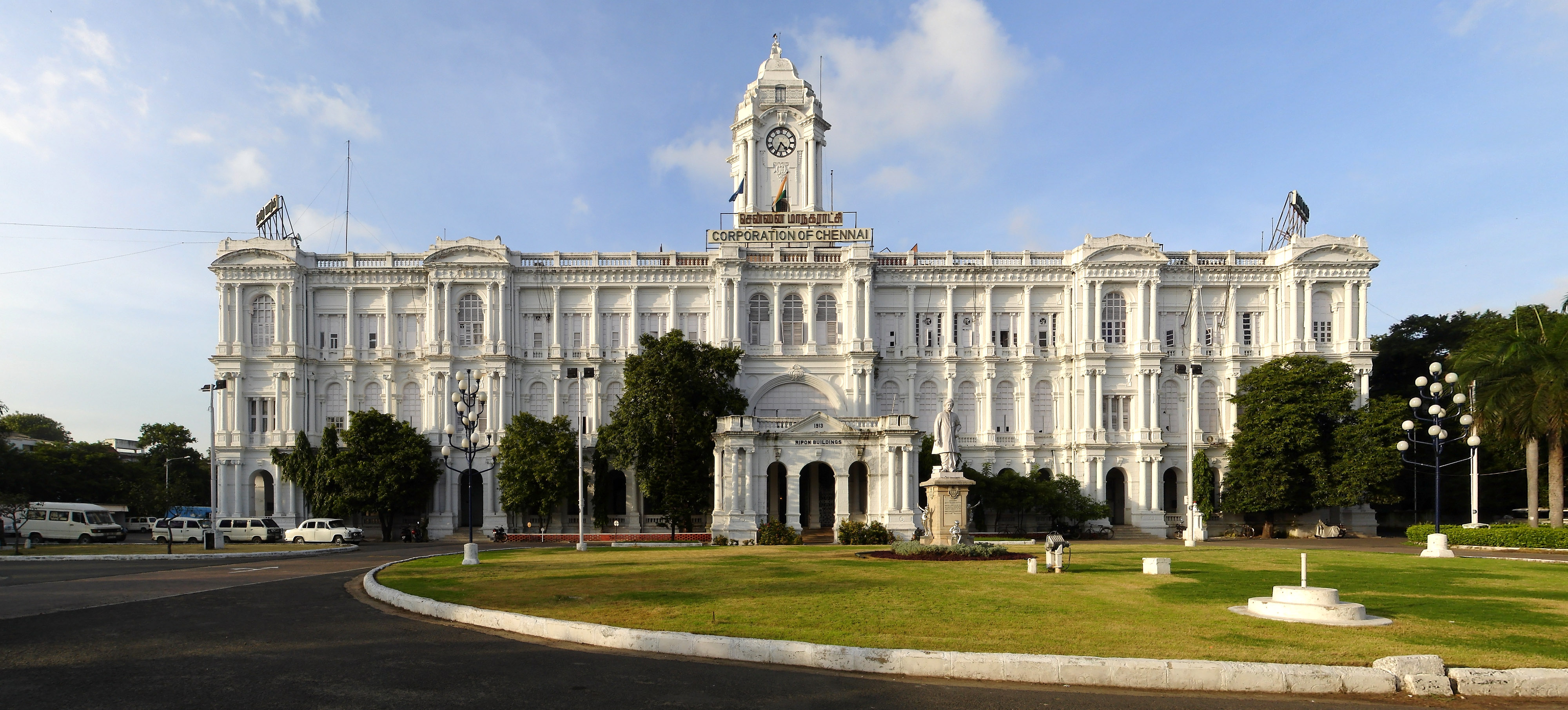
The Ripon Building, Chennai

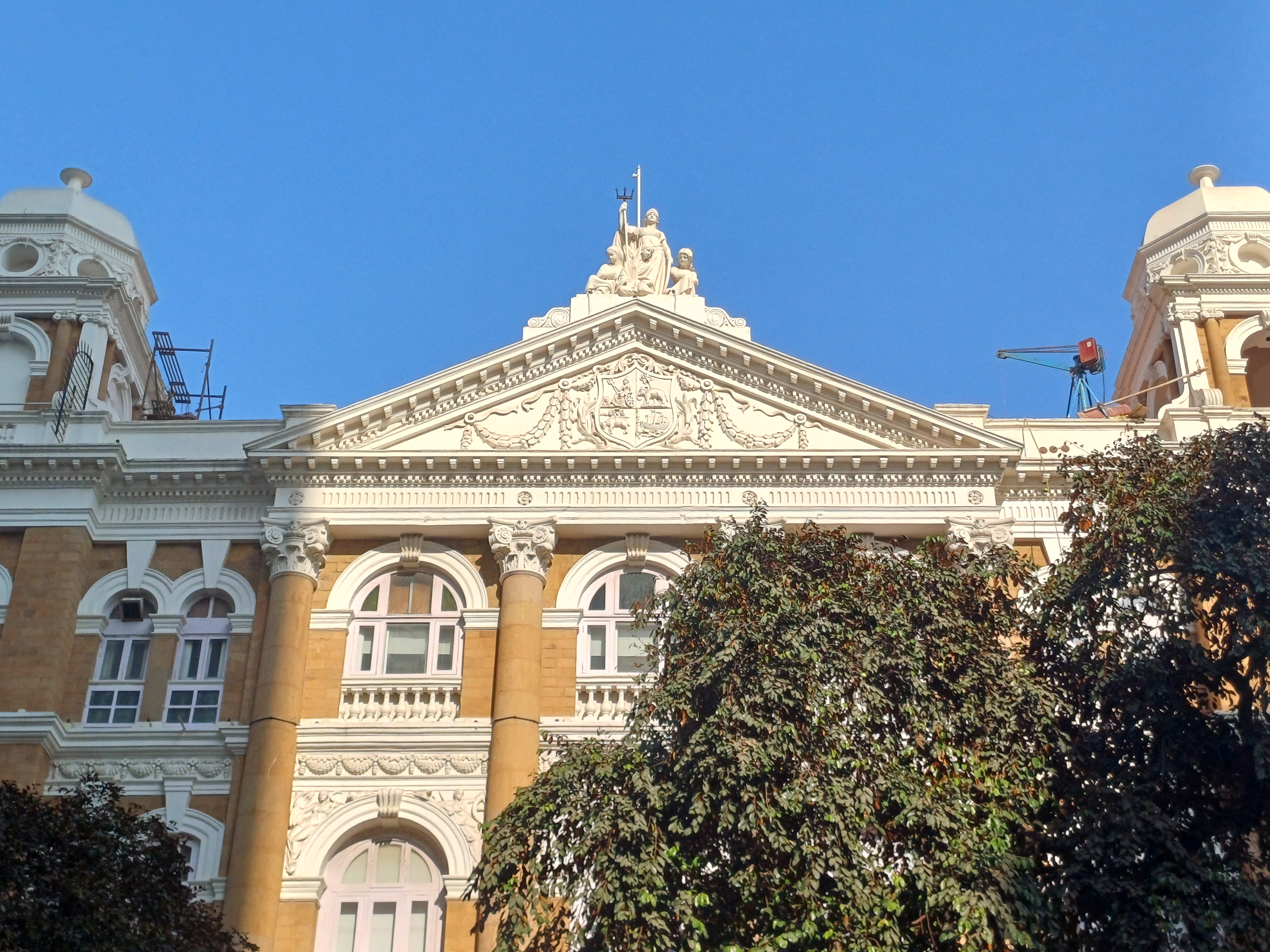
South face of The Standard Chartered Building, Bombay

=== India ===
India has the largest collection of Edwardian architecture buildings outside of the United Kingdom.

- Ripon Building, Chennai
- Southern Railway Buildings, Chennai
- Chowringhee Mansions, Calcutta
- Esplanade Mansions, Calcutta
- Rashtrapati Bhavan (Viceroy's House), New Delhi
- India Gate, New Delhi
- Parliament House (Sansad Bhavan), New Delhi
- Secretariat Building (North and South Block), New Delhi
- Main Building, The Doon School, Dehradun
- Victoria Memorial, Calcutta
- Government House (Raj Bhavan), Calcutta
- Indian Museum, Calcutta
- Bombay Town Hall (Asiatic Society of Bombay), Bombay
- Marshall Buildings, Bombay
- Bombay House, Bombay
- Central Bank of India Buildings, Bombay
- Bank of Bombay Buildings (State Bank of India Fort Branch), Bombay
- The Standard Chartered Buildings (Grindlays Bank), Bombay
- National Gallery of Modern Art, Cowasji Jehangir Hall, Bombay
- Ballard Bunder Gatehouse, Bombay
- Buildings of the Ballard Estate, Bombay
- Royal Opera House, Bombay
- Royal Indian Mint (India Government Mint), Bombay
- The Victoria and Albert Museum (Bhau Daji Lad Museum), Bombay
- Victoria Gardens (Jijamata Udyaan), Bombay
- The Knesset Eliyahoo Synagogue, Bombay
- The Army and Navy Building, Bombay
- Café Mondegar, Metro House, Bombay
- Bombay Gymkhana, Bombay
- Willingdon Sports Club, Bombay
- Royal Bombay Yacht Club, Bombay
- Royal Indian Mint (India Government Mint), Calcutta
- Calcutta Town Hall, Calcutta
- General Post Office Buildings, Calcutta
- General Post Office Buildings, Bombay
- General Post Office Buildings, Chennai
- National Library of India, Belvedere Estate, Calcutta
- Metropolitan Buildings, Calcutta
- Ordnance Factory Board Offices, Calcutta
- Marble Palace, Calcutta
- Bankshall Court, Calcutta
- Currency Building, Calcutta
- Writers' Buildings, Calcutta
- The Oberoi Grand Hotel, Calcutta
- Metcalfe Hall, Calcutta
- The Bengal Club, Calcutta
- Calcutta Club, Calcutta

=== Ireland ===
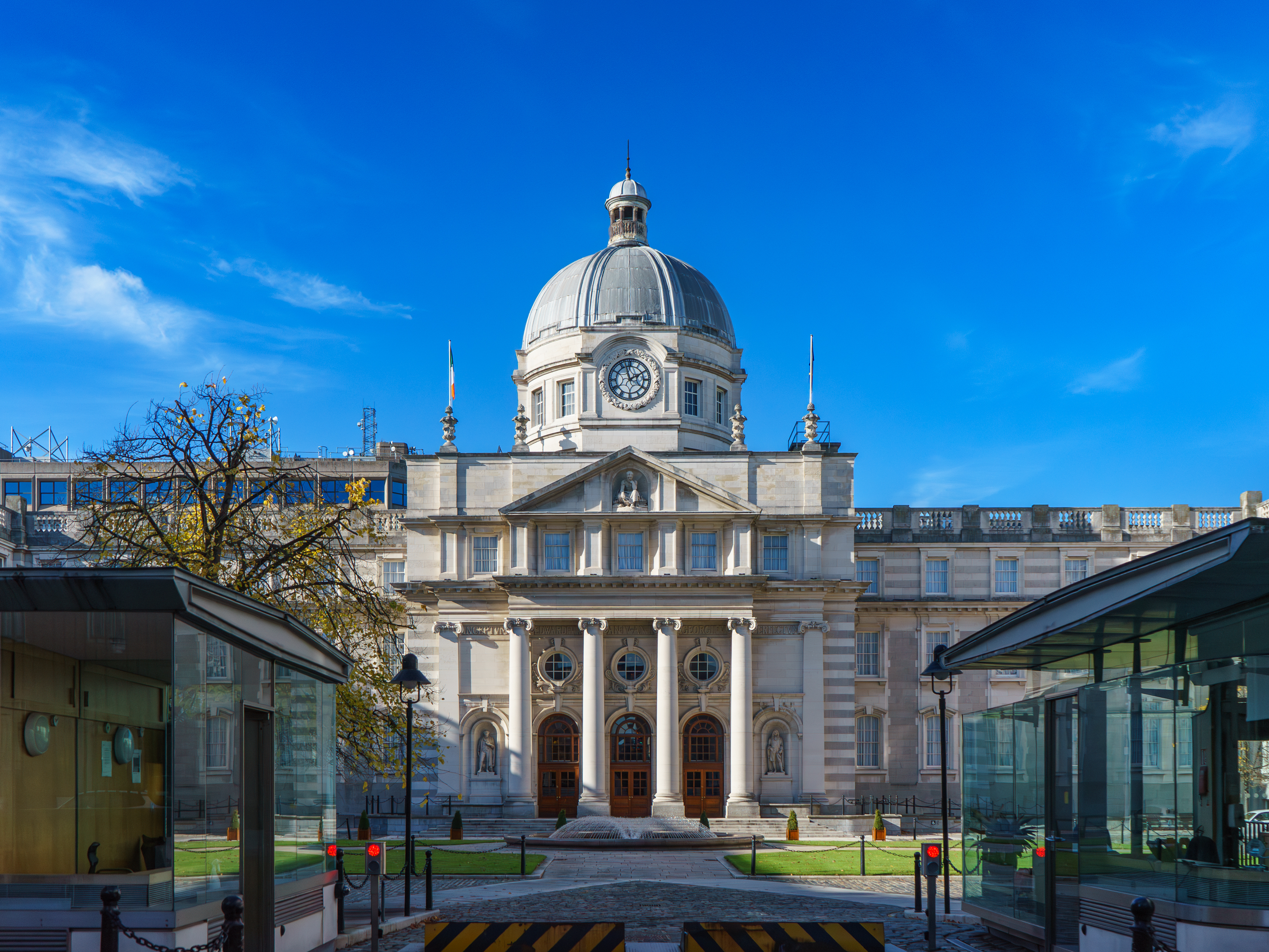
Government Buildings near Merrion Square, Dublin

- Government Buildings, Dublin
- Farmleigh, Dublin
- Iveagh Buildings, Iveagh Trust, Dublin
- Liberties College, Dublin

=== Malaysia ===
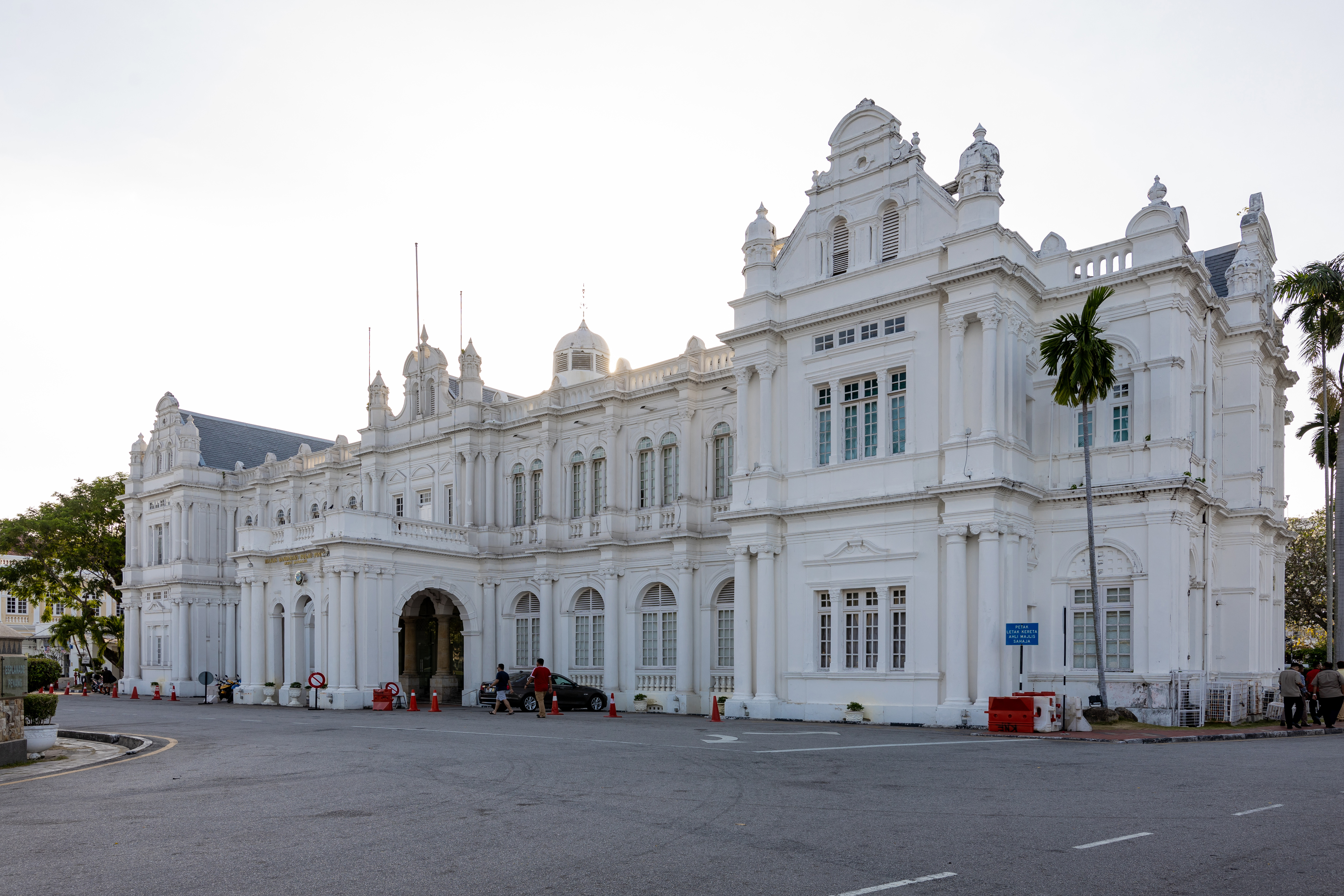
Penang City Hall in Penang

- City Hall, George Town, Penang (1903)
- Second floor extension to Town Hall, George Town, Penang (1903)
- Former Government Offices (now State Islamic Council building), George Town, Penang (1907)
- Federated Malay States railway station/Malayan Railways building (Wisma Kastam), George Town, Penang by Arthur Benison Hubback (1909)
- George Town Dispensary/Wisma Yeap Chor Ee, George Town, Penang (1922)
- Ipoh Town Hall and former General Post Office, Ipoh, Perak (1916)
- Railway station in Ipoh, Perak by Arthur Benison Hubback (1917 to 1935)
- Former State Secretariat (State Library), Seremban, Negeri Sembilan (1912)

=== New Zealand ===
- Auckland Town Hall, Auckland, New Zealand
- General Post Office (former), Auckland, New Zealand
- Auckland Ferry Terminal
- Old Public Trust Building, Wellington, New Zealand (1909)
- Erskine College, Wellington (1906)

=== Singapore ===
- Clock tower of the Victoria Theatre and Concert Hall (1905)
- Central Fire Station (1908)
- Saint Joseph's Institution (1900s, 1910s extensions)

=== South Africa ===
- Durban City Hall (1906–1910)
- Cape Town City Hall (1900 - 1905)
- Rand Club Building (1902 - 1904)

=== Sri Lanka ===
- Royal College, Colombo

=== Taiwan ===
- Beitou Hot Spring Museum

== See also ==
- Architecture of London – Overview of the architecture in London
- Baroque Revival architecture – Architectural movement
- Edwardian era – Historical period in Britain from 1901 to 1910
