= Tang Chi Ngong Building =

Building in the University of Hong Kong

Coordinates: 22.283564°N 114.139976°E

- 鄧志昂樓
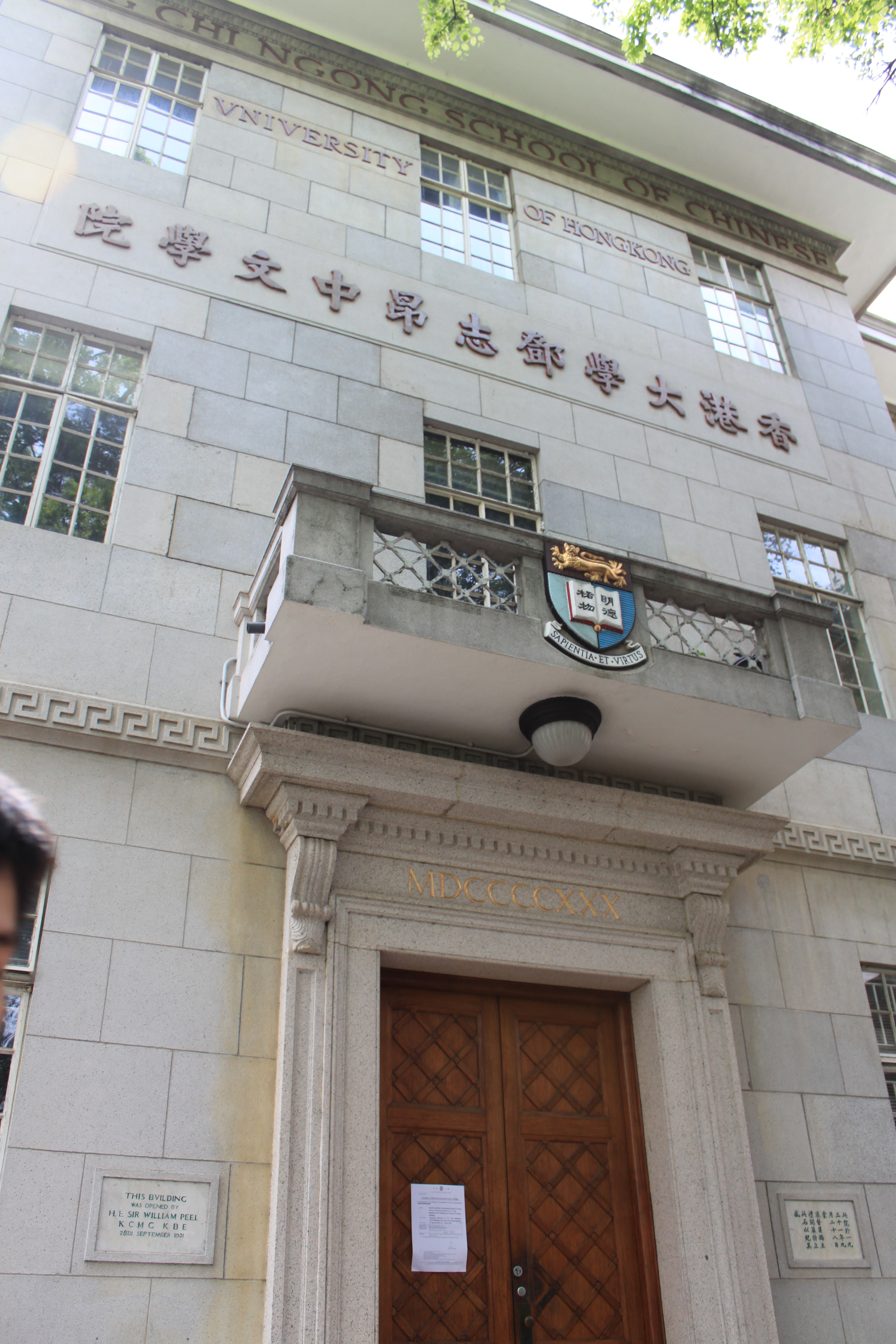
- Interactive map of the Tang Chi Ngong Building area

General information
- Type: Academic
- Architectural style: Neo-classical
- Completed: 1931
- Owner: University of Hong Kong

Declared Monument of Hong Kong
- Designated: 1995; 31 years ago
- Reference no.: 58

The Tang Chi Ngong Building (Chinese: 鄧志昂樓) is a building of the University of Hong Kong. It is located on the main campus near Pok Fu Lam Road in Pok Fu Lam, Hong Kong Island, Hong Kong. It opened in 1931 and currently houses the Jao Tsung-I Petite Ecole. The exterior of the building became a declared monument in 1995.

== History ==
The idea to establish a school of Chinese was proposed in the inter-war period. Construction of the premises began in 1929 following a donation from Tang Chi-ngong, father of the philanthropist Sir Tang Shiu-kin, after whom the building was named.

The building was opened by Sir William Peel, Governor of Hong Kong, in 1931 and since then further donations have been received for the endowment of teaching Chinese language and literature. The building has been used for other purposes since the 1970s but the name remained unchanged. It housed the Centre of Asian Studies till 2012 and now houses the Jao Tsung-I Petite Ecole.

== Architecture ==
This three-storey flat-roofed building is of Neo-classical style and surfaced with Shanghai plaster. The exterior of the building became a declared monument in 1995.

The Building is unique for the use of the letter "V" in place of the letter "U" as in "Vniversity", reflecting a practice common for Latin stone inscriptions in the 1920s and 1930s. The word "vniversity" in capital letters appears on the stone arch, façade, as well as on the stone tablet marking the building's foundation date.

== Gallery ==
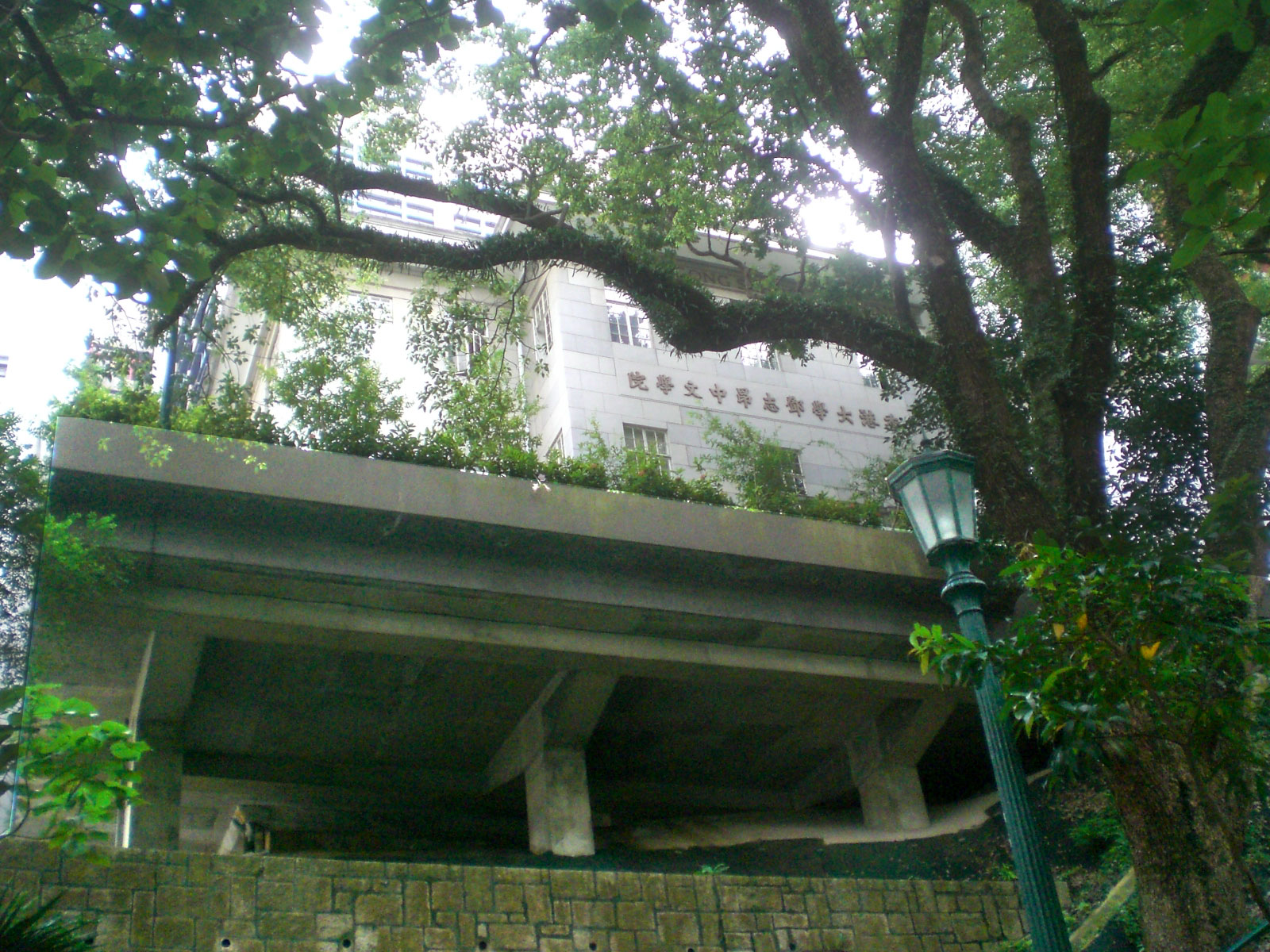
The building is built on-top of an artificial platform

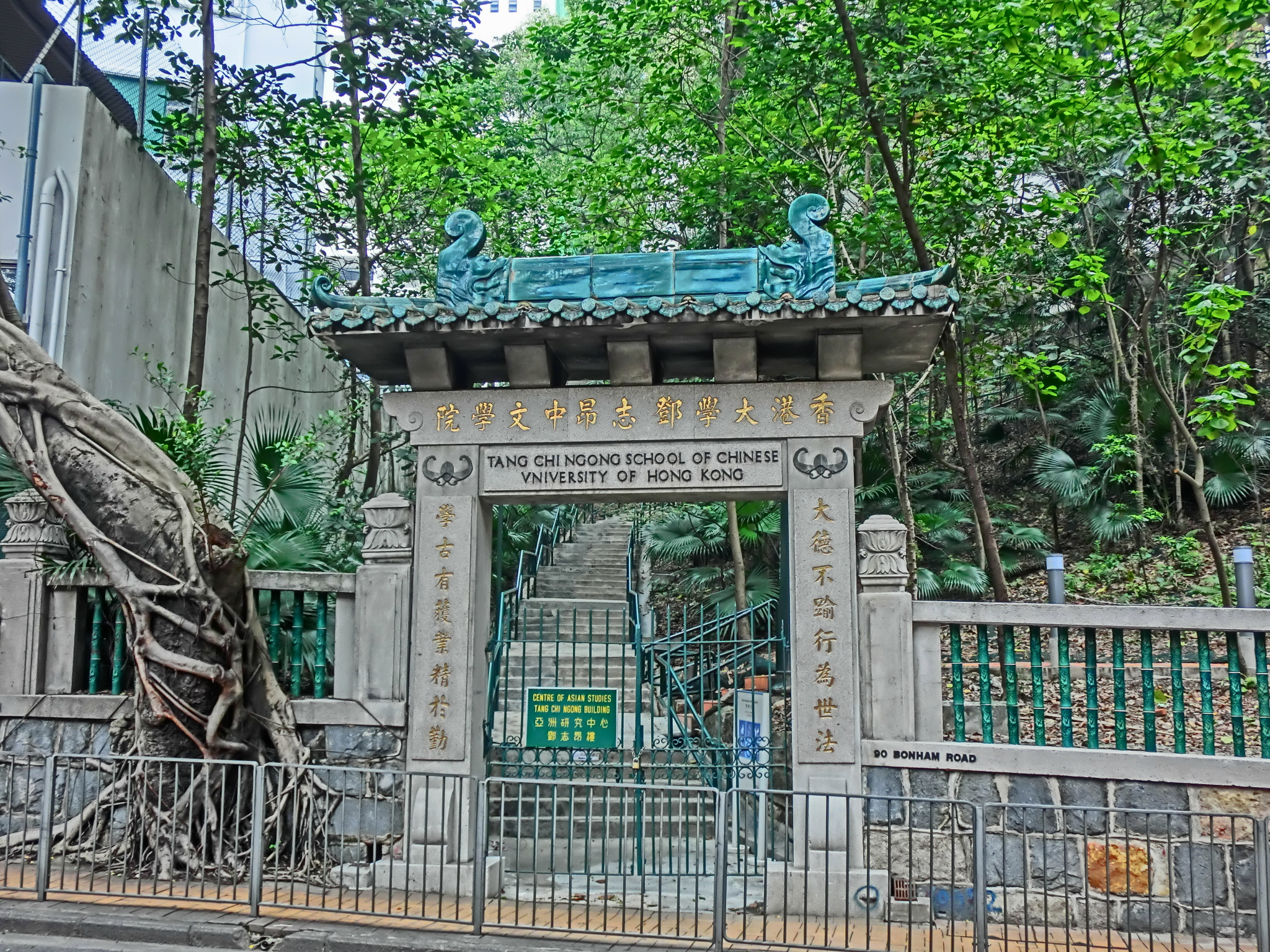
Paifang (stone arch) at the entrance on Bonham Road
