= Main Building of the University of Hong Kong =

University Building of the University of Hong Kong

Coordinates: 22.2841°N 114.1378°E

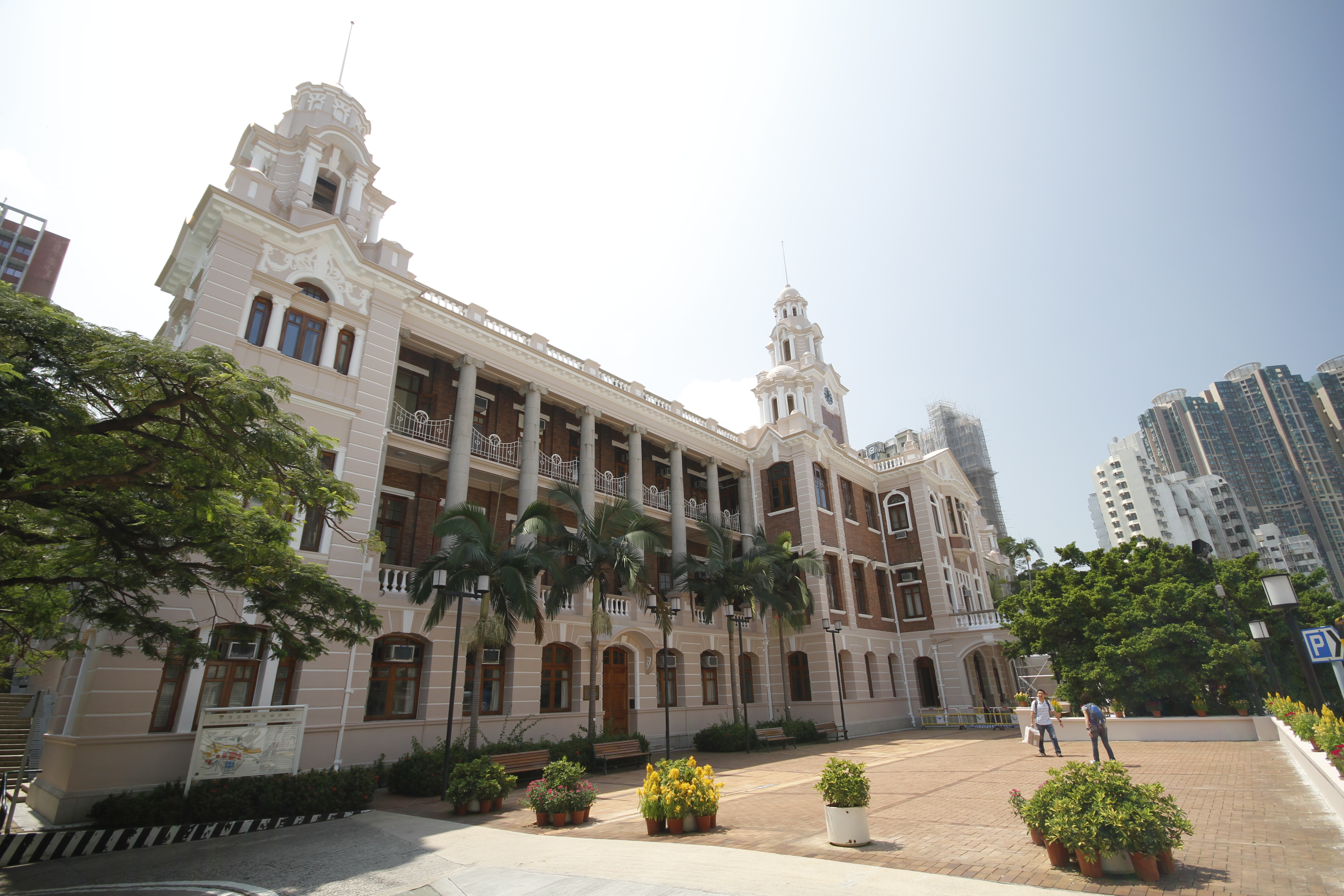
Exterior of the Main Building

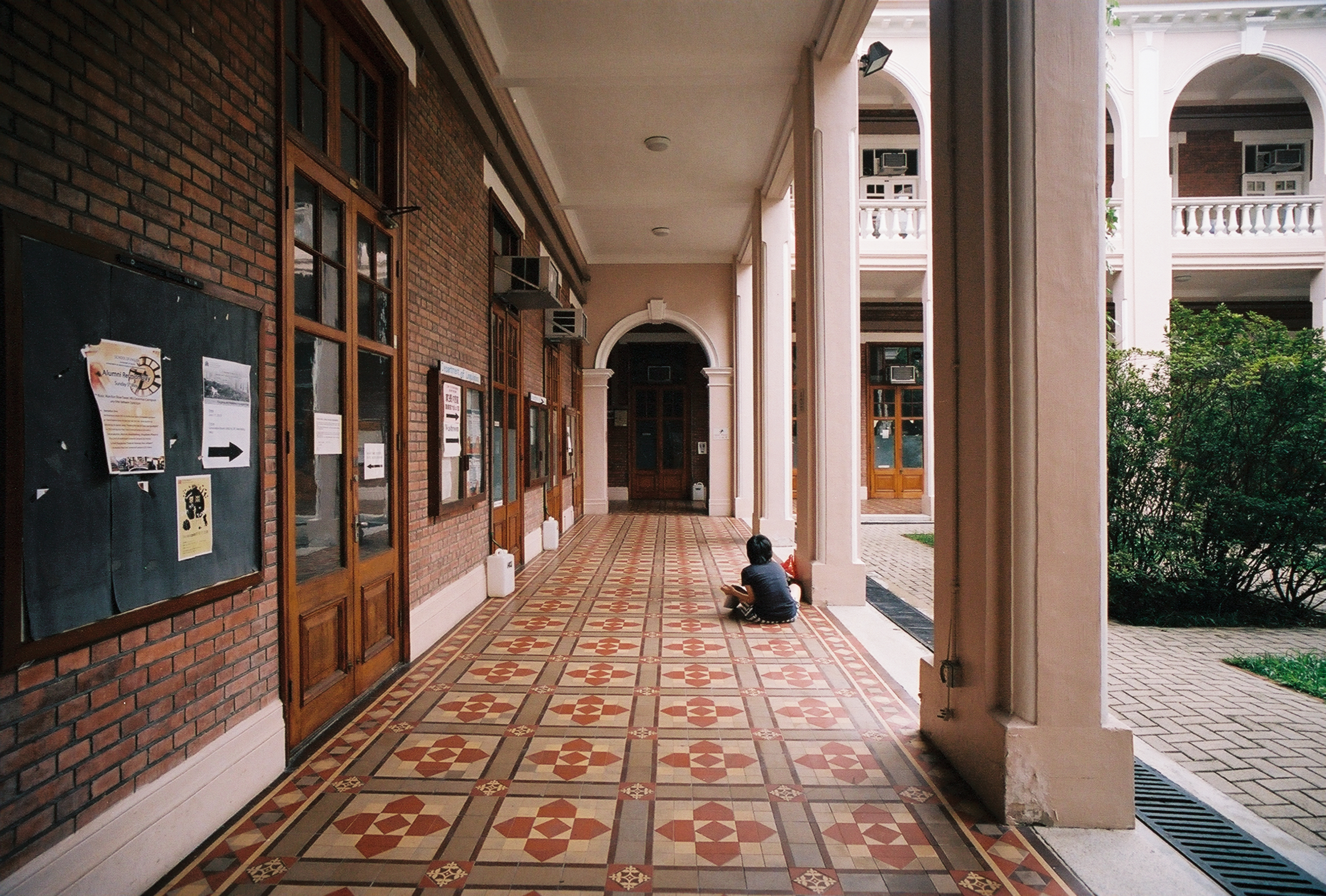
Corridors of the Main Building

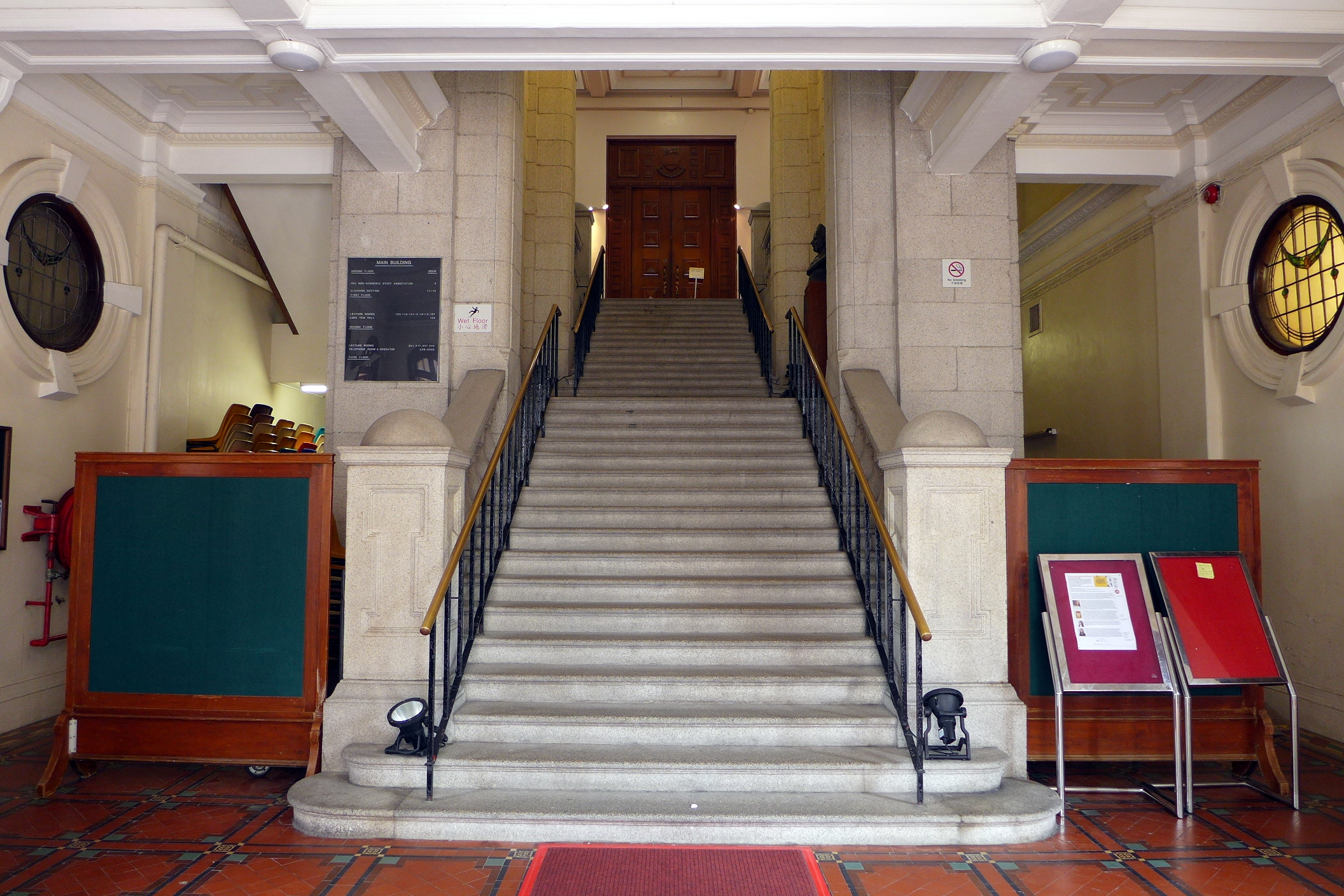
Entrance of the Main Building

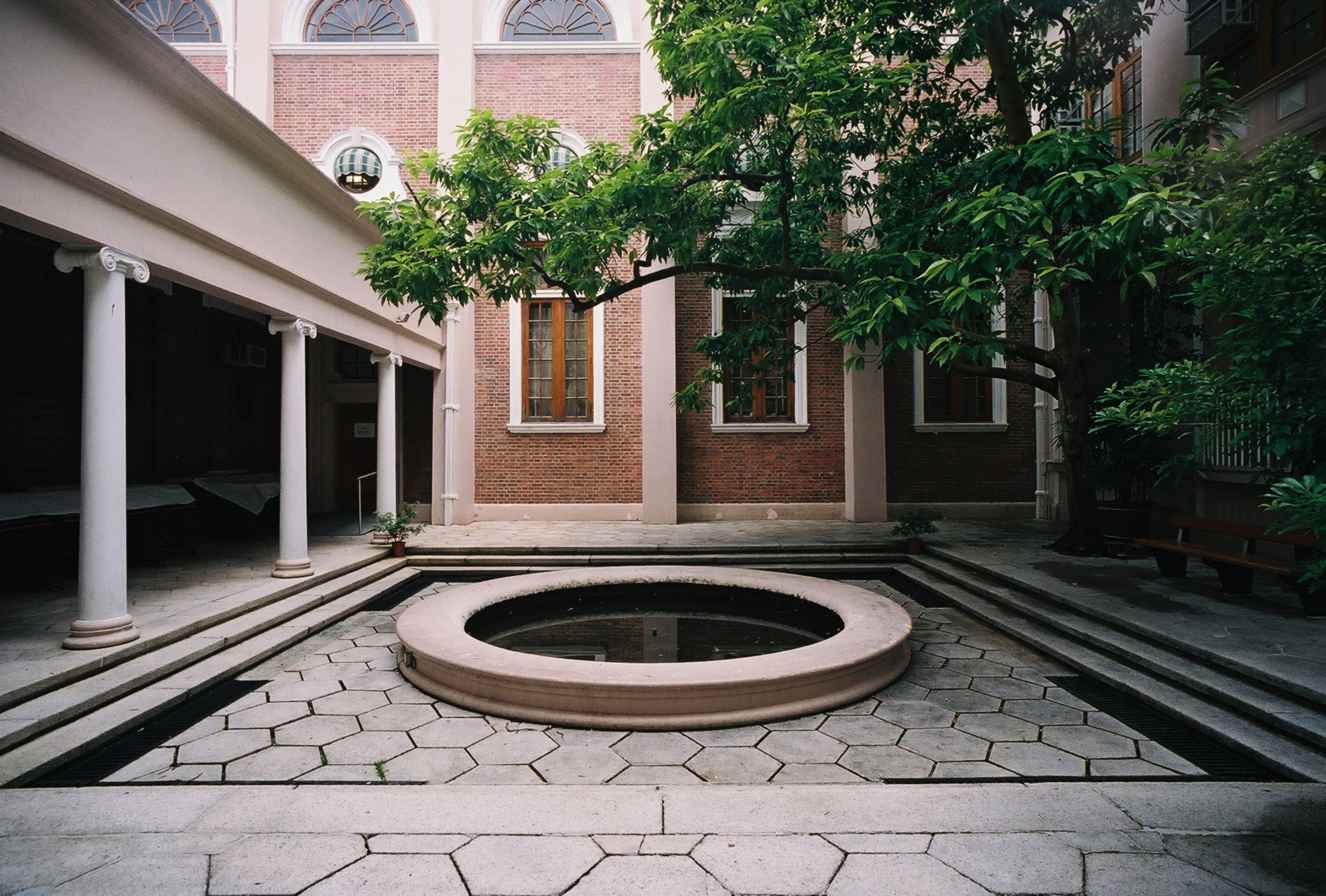
Garden inside the Main Building

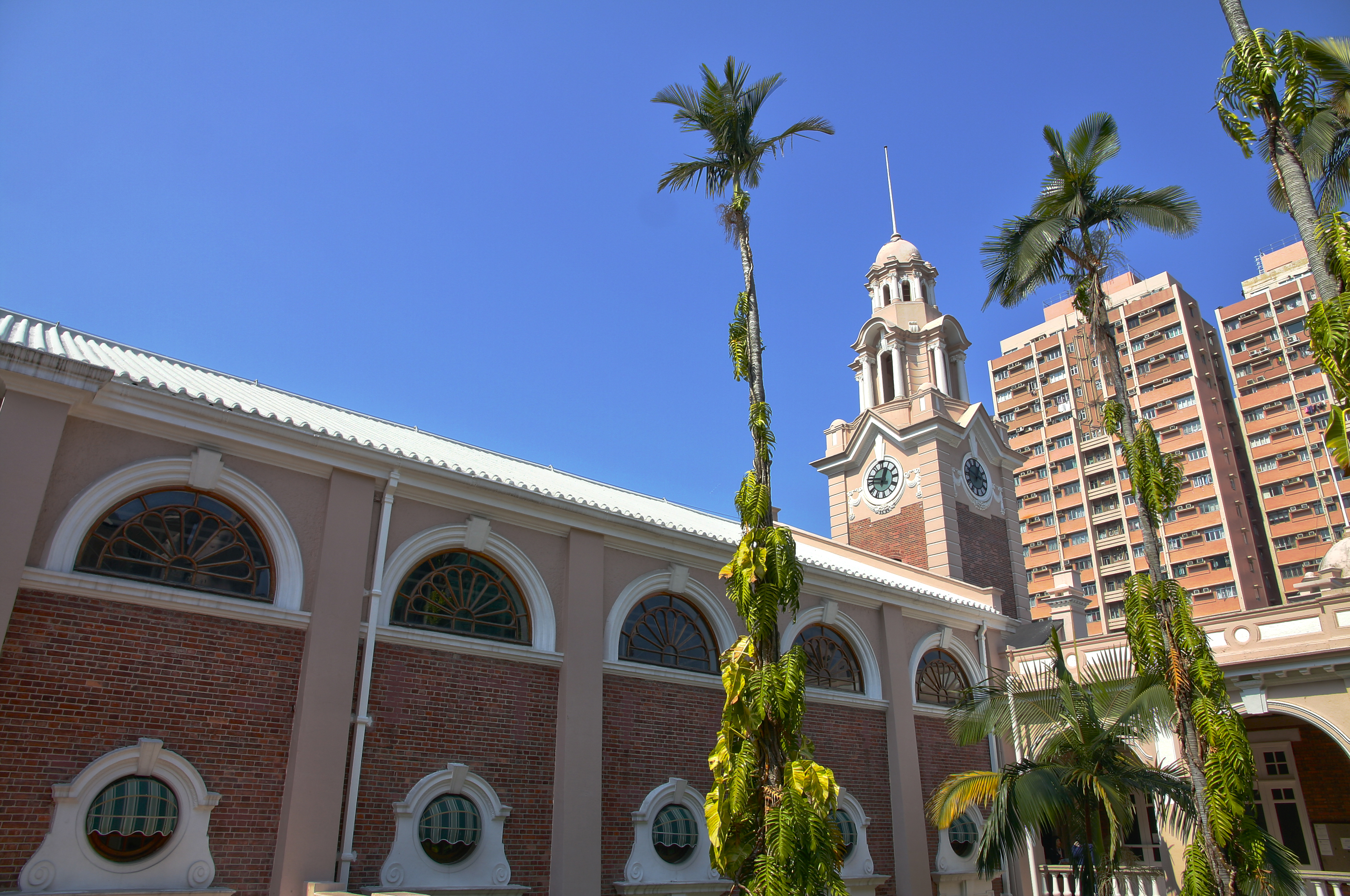
Palms grown within the Main Building

The Main Building of the University of Hong Kong (Chinese: 香港大學本部大樓) is the oldest building of the University of Hong Kong. It is located on the main campus on Bonham Road and Pok Fu Lam Road in Pok Fu Lam, Hong Kong Island, Hong Kong. It was built in the architectural style of Edwardian Baroque, designed by Alfred Bryer of Leigh & Orange and is three storeys high. The exterior of the building has been a declared monument in Hong Kong since 1985.

== History ==
The Main Building was built with donations by Sir Hormusjee Naorojee Mody and construction began in 1910. The building was inaugurated on 11 March 1912, and the foundation stone was laid on 16 March of the same year by the then Governor of Hong Kong Sir Frederick Lugard (later Lord Lugard). During the early period of the university, the main building served as the only building of the university.

The Main Building was transformed into a relief hospital during the Battle of Hong Kong in December 1941. Parts of the building were badly looted after the fall of Hong Kong; the roof of the Great Hall was removed and the timber used as fuel. Classes were suspended during the war and were only resumed in October 1946 when the building's restoration work was completed.

The exterior of the building was made a declared monument in Hong Kong in 1985.

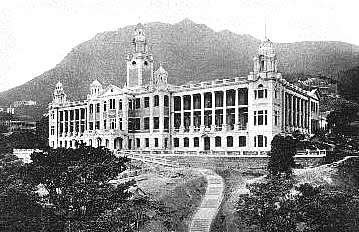
The Main Building in 1912

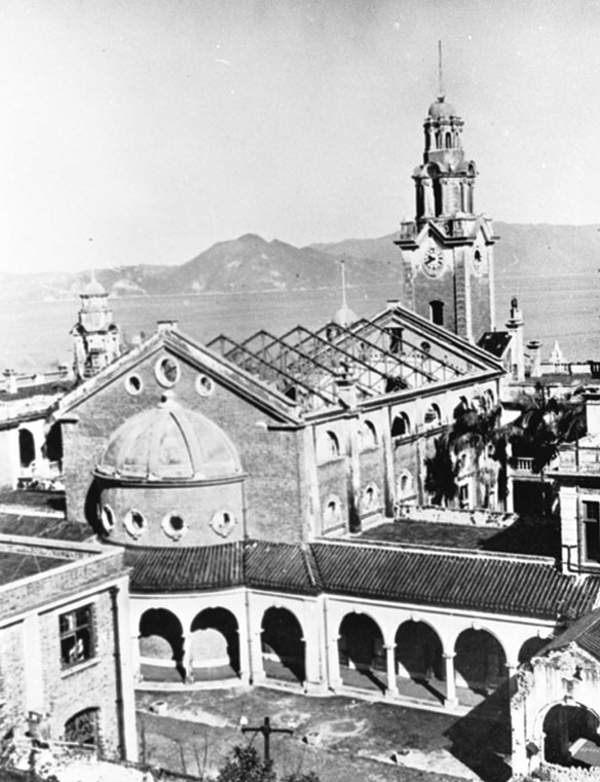
The Main Building in 1946, which had been seriously scarred and looted after the fall of Hong Kong

== Architecture ==
The main building was built by Alfred Bryer from the architectural firm Leigh & Orange. It is built in the Edwardian Baroque architectural style and is three storeys high, with a clock tower built at the top centre of the building alongside four turrets. Four courtyards are in the middle with U-shaped corridors surrounding the building's classrooms and offices.

== Loke Yew Hall ==
Loke Yew Hall is a hall located at the middle of the Main Building. It is used for hosting important academic and social events of the university, such as degree-awarding congregations and high-table dinners. It was originally known as the Grand Hall and was renamed to Loke Yew Hall in 1956 in memory of Dr Loke Yew, a Malayan early benefactor of the university. The hall was then later lengthened with sections at the rear added.
