= Ballard Bunder Gatehouse =

Converted maritime museum in Mumbai, India

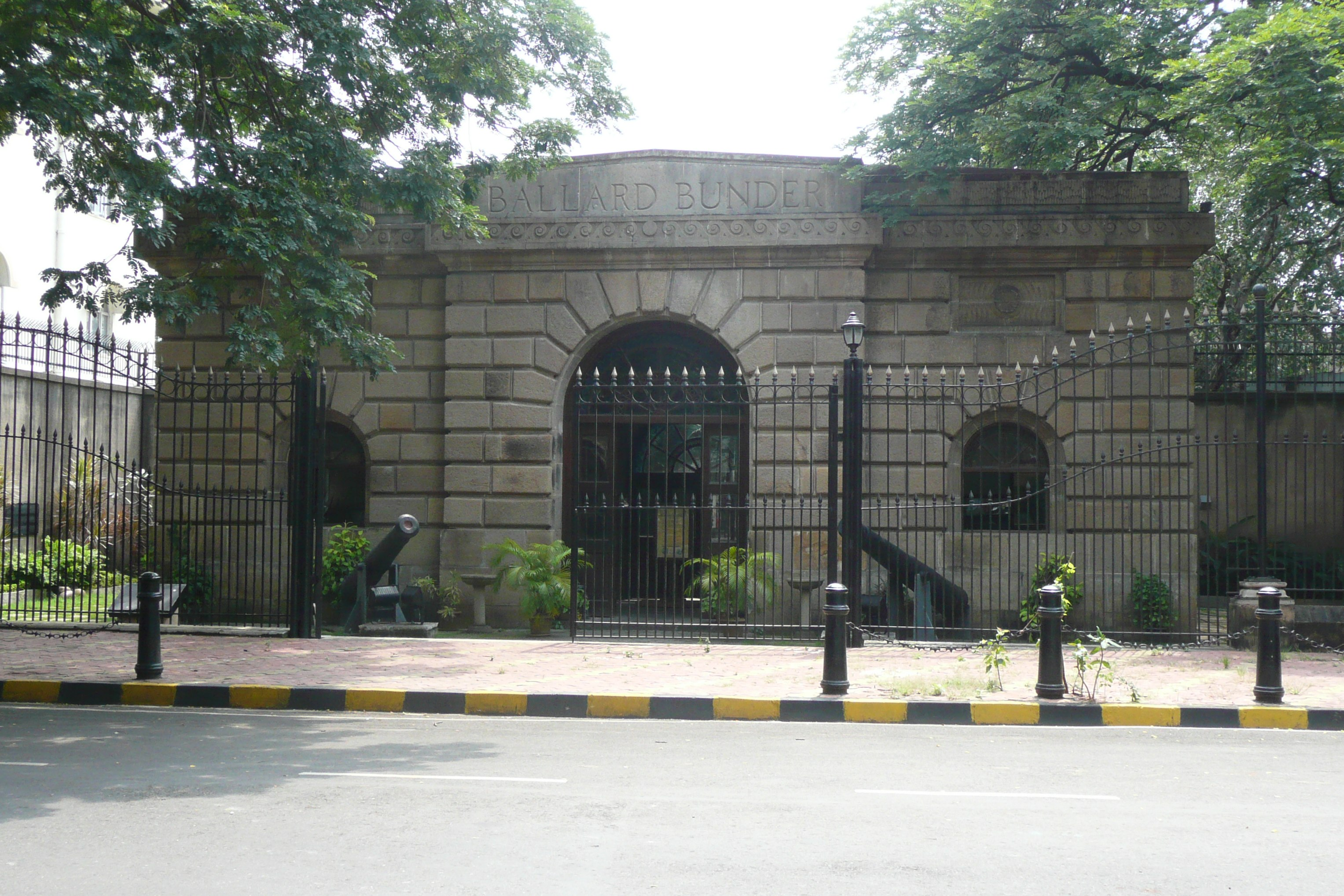
- Established: 1920
- Location: Ballard Estate, Mumbai, India
- Coordinates: 18.9336595°N 72.8403716°E

Ballar Bunder Gatehouse is a Grade I Heritage structure that has been converted into a maritime museum, located at Ballard Estate in the old Fort area of Mumbai, India. It was built in 1920 to commemorate the realignment of the harbour and is located where Ballard Pier, a small pier once existed with an approach jetty at right angles to the pier. The building was among the five entries from the Mumbai for the 2009 UNESCO Asia-Pacific Heritage Awards for Culture Heritage Conservation. It is one of the stops on Special tour of Museums in the city, a tour organised by BEST and MTDC as well as the Naval Dockyard Heritage Walk, conducted by the Naval Dockyard on the first Sunday of every month.

== History ==
In 1920 Ballard Bunder Gatehouse was built to commemorate Ballard pier being developed into Ballard Estate. This was a planned development by the Bombay Port Trust and was executed under a plan made by George Wittet, the chief architect of Bombay Port Trust between 1908 and 1914. After Independence from the British Raj, the gatehouse became part of the Naval Dockyard and fell into disuse, obscured from view for over 50 years. In 2005, the Indian Navy restored the building, opening it to the public as a maritime museum. The Navy dedicated the new museum to the city of Mumbai.

== Architecture ==
The contemporary triple arch gatehouse complements the architecture of Ballard Estate. The gatehouse design is similar to that of the Green Gate on the eastern waterfront.

== Collection ==
The museum collection includes giant 6 feet tall anchors and lights that are knee high and were once atop of a lighthouse. The museum also houses old maps and photographs of Mumbai, rich in diversity from goldsmiths and policemen to mill workers and fisher folk along with scale models of ships, trawlers and dhows.
