= International House, Sydney =

International House
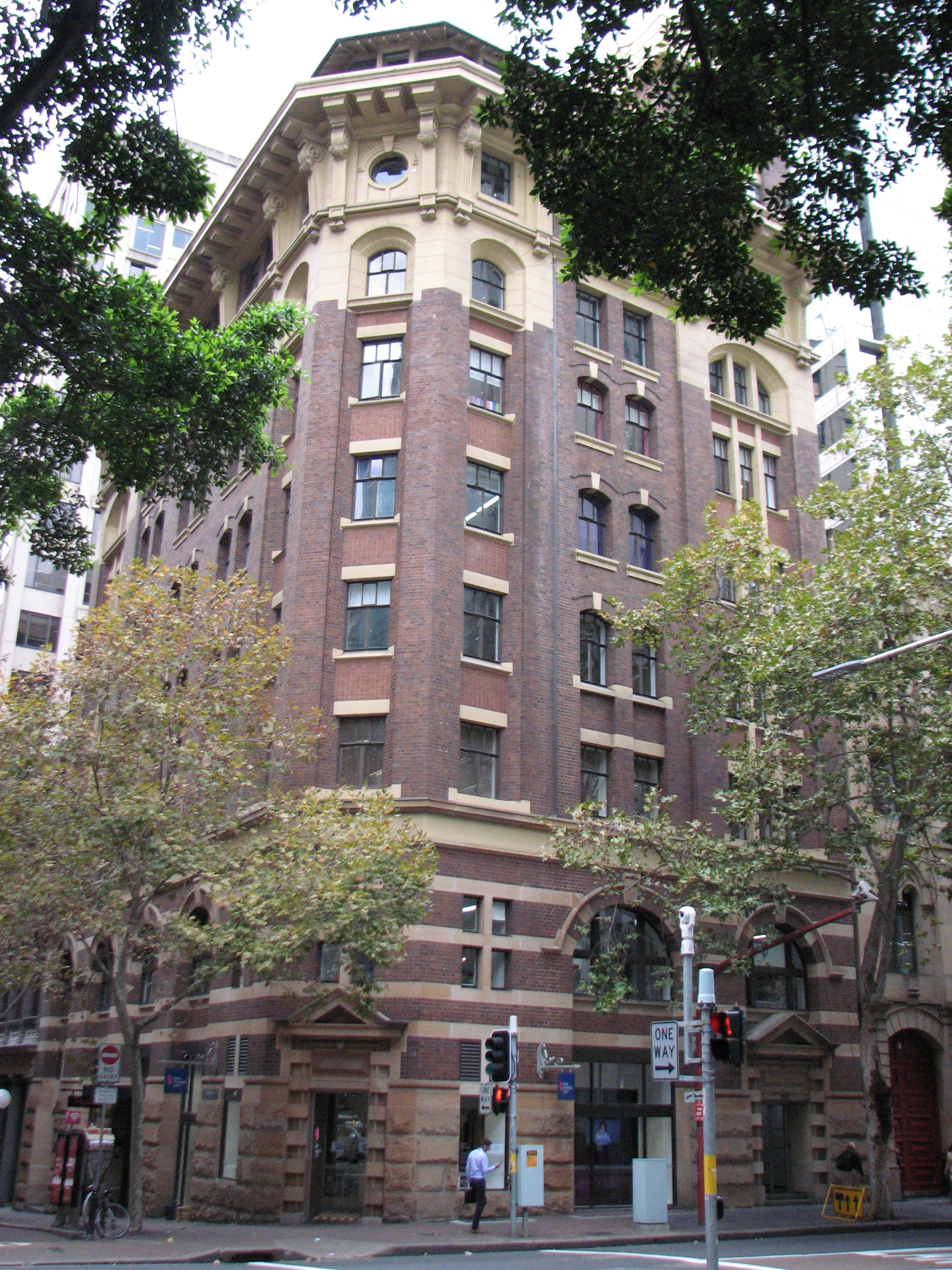
- International House, 14-16 York Street, Sydney

- Location within Sydney Location within Australia
- 33.8678°S 151.2062°E
- Location: 14-16 York Street, Sydney central business district, City of Sydney, New South Wales, Australia

History
- Built: 1913
- Built for: Estate of the late Jeremiah Brice Rundle

Site notes
- Architect(s): Robertson & Marks
- Architectural style: Federation Free Classical

New South Wales Heritage Register
- Official name: International House; Pomeroy House
- Type: State heritage (built)
- Designated: 2 April 1999
- Reference no.: 579
- Type: Commercial Office/Building
- Category: Commercial
- Builders: Howie, Brown & Moffat, Master Builders.

International House is a heritage-listed commercial building at 14-16 York Street, in the Sydney central business district, in New South Wales, Australia. It was designed by Robertson & Marks and built during 1913 by Howie, Brown & Moffat, Master Builders. It is also known as Pomeroy House. It was added to the New South Wales State Heritage Register on 2 April 1999.

== History ==
The land, containing the site was originally granted to T. D. Rowe by Crown Grant dated 4 July 1837. The site was adjacent to the military barracks which occupied fifteen acres of valuable land in this part of the town.

The barracks were enclosed within a fortress-like wall which began just north of present Margaret Street and extended to Barrack Street, taking up the whole area between George and Clarence Streets. The barracks constrained the development of the area for general commercial purposes. Investors had to wait until 1847, when the new Paddington barracks were completed. The old barracks were demolished between 1850 and 1853 and the valuable land was subdivided and sold at between forty and eighty pounds a square foot.

By this time the site of International House was owned by Peter William Plomer. The contemporary rate books describe the property as a two or three storey stone and slate building "stores" or "warehouse".

From the 1870s the site was occupied by a four-storey warehouse. In 1875 Jeremiah Brice Rundle took possession of the site. Rundle was a squatter, merchant and businessman. He was born in England and arrived in Australia in about 1835. After prosperous years which he spent as merchant and commission agent by 1867 he held over 300,000 hectares (750,000 acres) in Queensland and NSW. In 1881 he was appointed to the Legislative Council of NSW and was also a director and chairman of the Australian Joint Stock Bank. Between 1870 and his death in 1893 he was a director and chairman of the Australian Joint Stock Bank. Between 1870 and his death in 1893 he was a director of various other companies, such as the Sydney Meat Preserving Company, United Fire and Marine Insurance Company. According to contemporary records Rundle was one of the leading merchants and businessmen who made their contribution to the rapid progress of this part of the city.

Rundle died in 1893 at his residence "Pomeroy", Potts Point. His estate was later managed by the Permanent Trustee Company. The warehouse erected on his estate was a business proposition of the trustee and was named Pomeroy House in honour of Rundle. On 27 November 1913 an application was lodged by the office of architects Robertons & Marks to erect a building on the south-east corner of York and Barrack Street. The builders of Pomeroy House were Howie & Moffat, Master Builders. It was designed in the Federation Free Classical style. The category of Federation Free Classical included a considerable variety of architectural expressions drawing on a large repertoire of motifs from different countries and periods. It was a style well suited to express the confidence that accompanied the dynamic growth of the city in this period.

When Pomeroy House was first listed in the Sands Directories in 1916 the tenants included warehousemen on the second and third floor. By 1917 most of the floors were occupied: a millinery manufacturer on the first floor, warehousement on the second and third floor, Department of Home Affairs, Accounts Branch and Commonwealth Electoral Office on the fourth and seventh floor and an export company on the eighth floor. The Assessment Book in 1918 describes Pomeroy House as a warehouse of 10 rooms, which means that the floors were not yet partitioned at this stage. From 1922 even the basement was rented out and was occupied by a wine and spirit merchant company. Because of the good location, its closeness to the business centre, office space was much in demand in this area in the next decades. By the 1930s the building accommodated forty different offices. Some of them such as Bond Industries Ltd occupied a whole floor, but other floors were partitioned and shared between 8-10 different agents. According to the records by 1921 the building had 23 rooms.

In 1931 an external steel fire-escape was added in the light area. In 1942 the National Cash Register Pty Ltd purchased the property. The National Cash Register used only two levels, the other floors were leased as showroom, office or warehouse spaces. According to a building survey done by the council, 60 to 100 people worked in the building. A hand drawn sketch, attached to this building survey shows that in 1939 the entrance and stairs to the basement were already in their present place. It is known that in 1946 alterations and renovations were carried out on the building, but details of the works are not indicated in the records. In the 1960s the ground floor, 1st floor and 7th floor were subject to further alterations. By this time the building was generally referred to as 'International House.'

In 1959 a mechanical ventilation system was installed and in 1968 computer rooms were built-up. From 1975 the building was largely empty. After the National Cash register moved out, the property was passed in at auction in September 1975, and was sold to its present owner in 1978.

From 1979 to 1981 extensive renovations and alterations were implemented to the entire building. The refurbishment essentially involved the modernisation of all floors, the installation of an air conditioning system and false ceiling, the replacement of the two existing lifts and the formation of a kiosk in the former loading dock. The basement was accommodated to its present use as a restaurant. The ground floor and first floor were adapted to the requirements of banking operation to provide new tenancy for the State Bank of NSW. This alteration included the removal of existing windows and masonry on these levels and their replacement with new aluminium and glass shopfront. In 1988 the lift lobby was refurbished on both sides of the building and the lift shaft replaced on the eastern side. In 1990 the canvas canopy was replaced with a steel framed awning.

== Description ==
International House has two frontages, the major being on Barrack Street. The building comprises one ground level, 8 upper levels (including a level in the 'mansard roof') and a basement, and covers the complete area of the site.

The building displays characteristics of the Federation Free Classical style. Consistent with the style, architects Robertson and Marks used motifs from different countries and periods. For example, the combination of the characteristics of the Italian palazzo facade with a mansard roof from the seventeenth-century France.

The street facades are broken into three parts - a strong two storey base of sandstone and banded brickwork, the comparatively simple repetitive office floors and the projecting cornice. The sandstone is rock-faced at the base and rendered above the first floor level. Both facades are terminated at one end by a higher pedimented tower which extends the tripartite arched window of the end bay. The other end bay is incorporated into the chamfered corner of the building. The middle bays - two to York Street and six to Barrack Street are arched with sandstone voussoir and sills. There is a circular opening on the corner which is characteristic to the style.

There are three entrances, one pedimented one storey on the corner and two double height semicircular entries, one of which incorporates a pedimented doorway on the York Street side. The two storey base of the building repeats the semicircular arches.

The internal alterations gradually compromised the appearance of the ground floor facade and this The sandstone arch of the basement entrance in the second bay was lost during the extensive renovation of the building in 1980, when all the ground floor and first floor openings have been altered. The new infill glazing modified the original character of the two storey base of the building.

=== Condition ===
As of 14 October 1997, generally the exterior of the building is in good condition.

=== Modifications and dates ===
- 1913 – constructed
- 1979-81 – first floor arched windows replaced and shopfront windows on the ground floor.
- 1946 – eighth level windows possibly replaced. Mansard roof possibly replaced by present roof form.

== Heritage listing ==
As at 20 October 1997, International House is historically significant for its contribution to the renewal and continuation of the well-established 19th century warehouse precinct of York Street in the early 20th century. It is associated with the prominent architectural firm of Robertson & Marks. The building is and outstanding and highly intact example of an original commercial exterior. It has further significance as an important element in the streetscape of Barrack and York Streets and the overall diversity and character of the city.

International House was listed on the New South Wales State Heritage Register on 2 April 1999 having satisfied the following criteria.

The place is important in demonstrating the course, or pattern, of cultural or natural history in New South Wales.

The siting and quality of the building reflects the economic importance of the York Street warehouse precinct, which was established in the 19th century and continued in the early 20th century. The building is an important work of the noted architectural partnership of Robertson & Marks.

The place is important in demonstrating aesthetic characteristics and/or a high degree of creative or technical achievement in New South Wales.

The building is an outstanding and substantially intact example of an original commercial exterior. The building's facades of dark brick with sandstone trims are distinctive and have outstanding architectural value. It makes a dominant contribution to the streetscape on a prominent corner site.

The place is important in demonstrating the principal characteristics of a class of cultural or natural places/environments in New South Wales.

The International house has comparative significance because it is an outstanding and well preserved example of a highly intact commercial exterior which contribute strongly to the townscape of Barrack and York Street.

== See also ==
- Australian non-residential architectural styles
