= Bombing of Singapore =

Bombing of Singapore may refer to:

- Bombing of Singapore (1941), the first Japanese air raid on the city
- Raids conducted during the Malayan Campaign and the Battle of Singapore (29 December 1941 to 15 February 1942)
- Bombing of Singapore (1944–1945), raids conducted by United States and British aircraft prior to the city's liberation at the end of the war
- MacDonald House bombing, bombing conducted by a group of Indonesian soldiers
