= Penang Islamic Department Building =

Government offices in George Town, Penang, Malaysia

- Bangunan Jabatan Hal Ehwal Agama Islam Pulau Pinang (Malay)
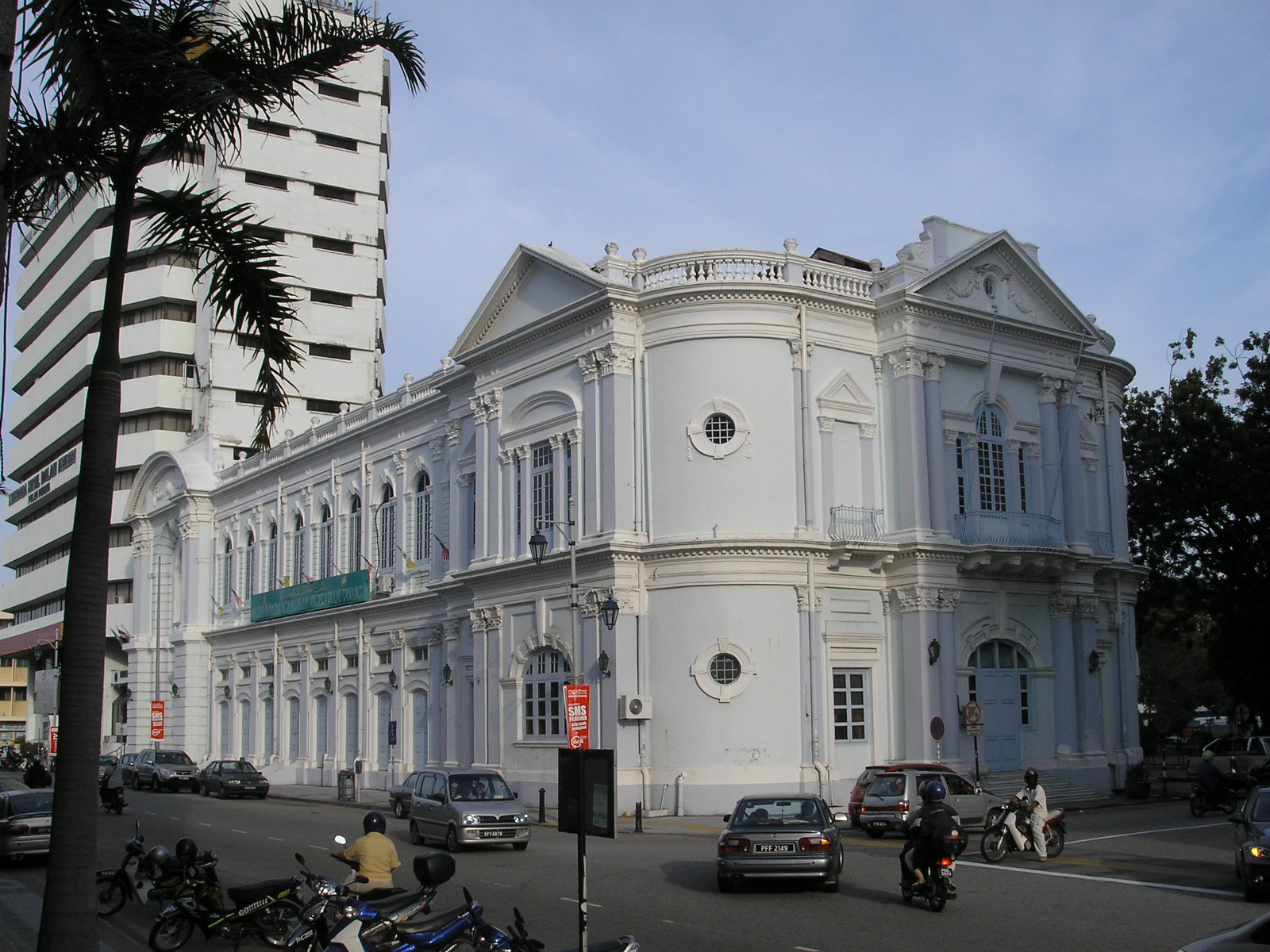
- Interactive map of the Penang Islamic Department Building area
- Former names: Government Offices (1907–1944)

General information
- Architectural style: Neoclassical
- Location: Beach Street, George Town, Penang, Malaysia, George Town, Malaysia
- Coordinates: 5.4185°N 100.3437°E
- Current tenants: Penang Islamic Department
- Construction started: 1907
- Completed: 1909
- Opened: 1909

Height
- Top floor: 2

Technical details
- Floor count: 2

The Penang Islamic Department Building is an office building in George Town within the Malaysian state of Penang. Completed in 1909, the building, situated at Downing Street within the city's Central Business District (CBD), is the only remaining remnant of the much larger Government Offices complex, the administrative seat of Penang under the Straits Settlements, which was largely destroyed by Allied bombing in World War II. It now accommodates the Penang Islamic Department.

== History ==
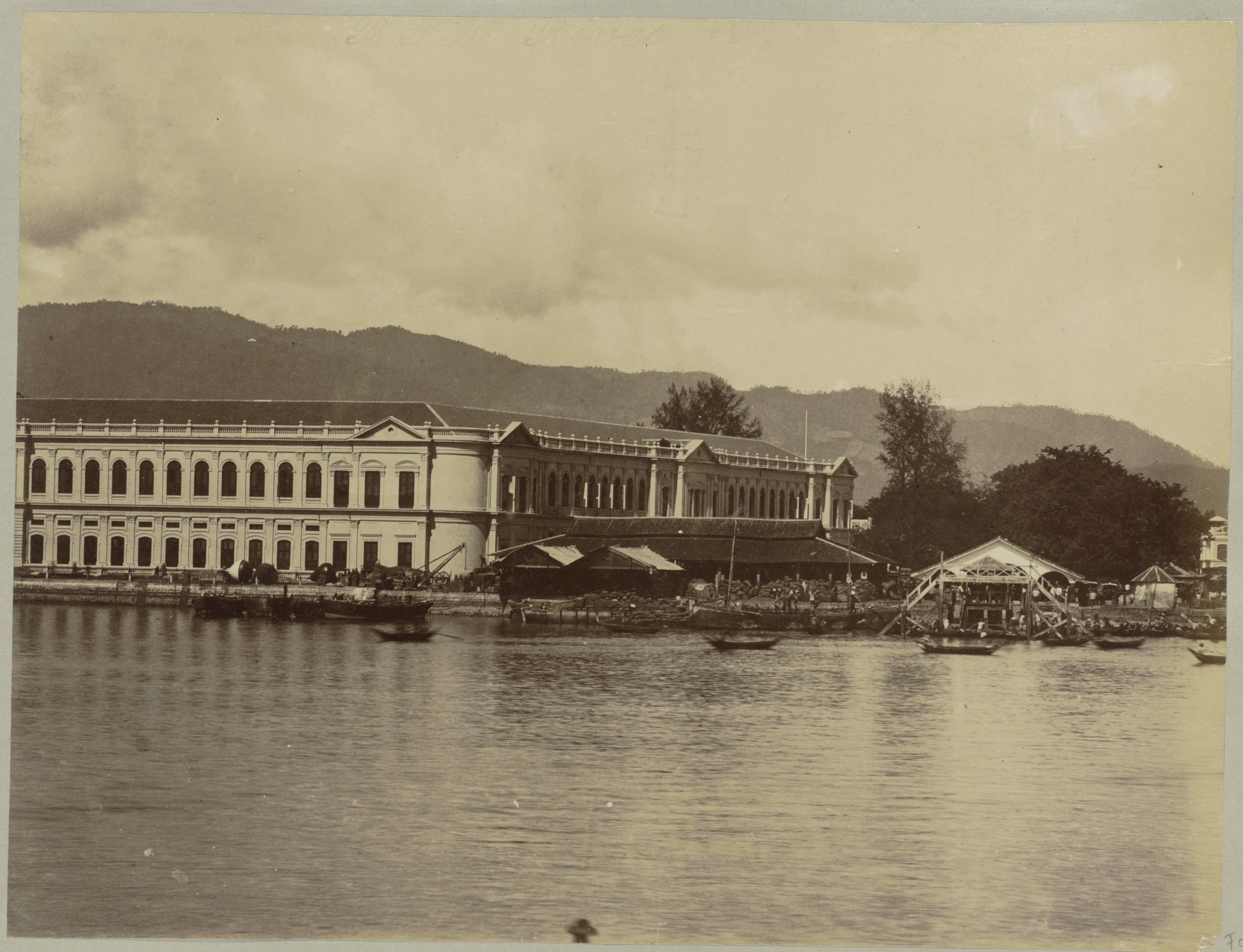
Government Offices as seen from the Penang Strait c. 1892.

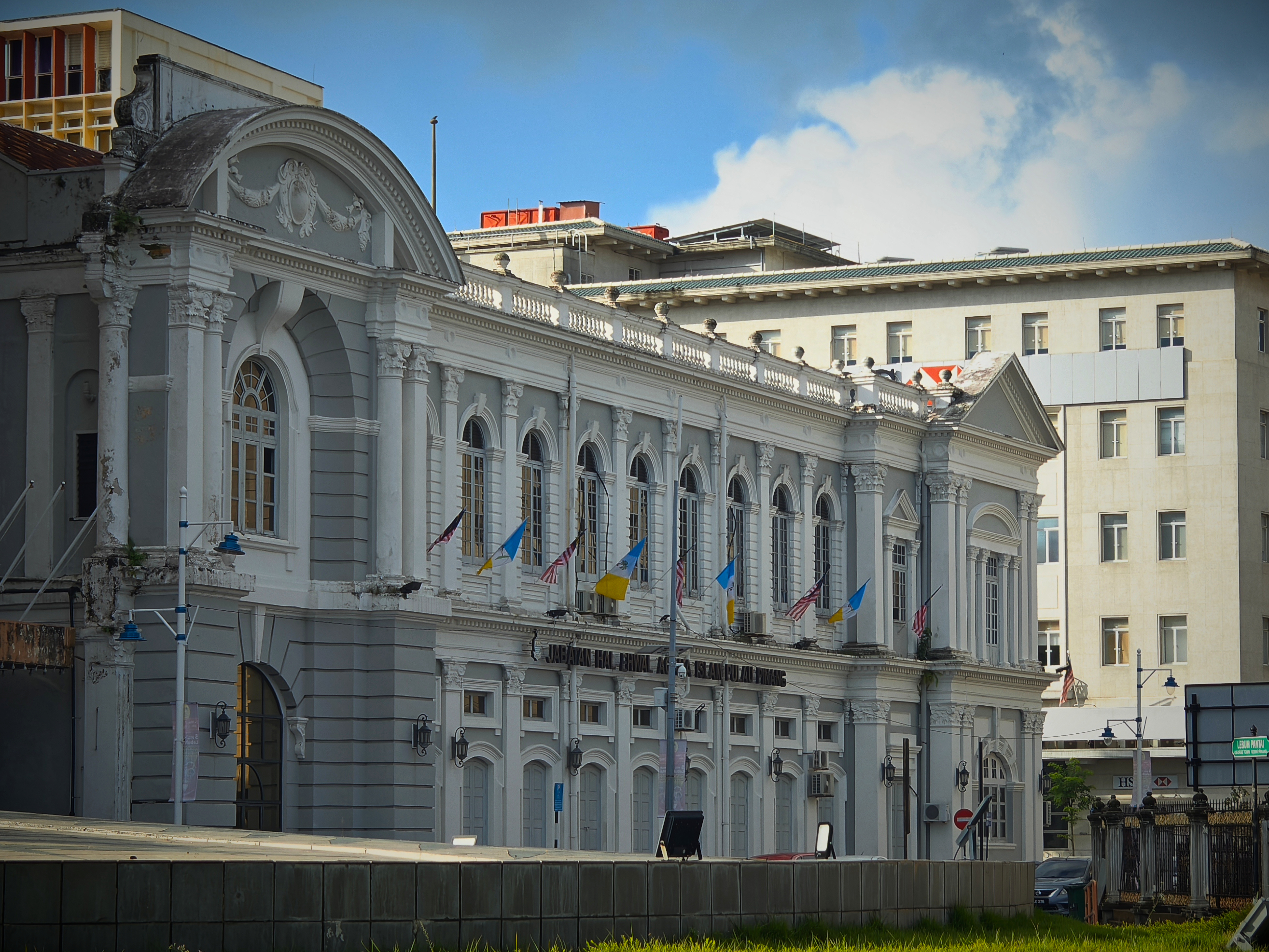
Side view of the building, as seen from the Jubilee Clock Tower. In the background is the HSBC Building.

Between 1883 and 1889, land was reclaimed along George Town's eastern coast, creating what is now Weld Quay. This newly created land enabled the Straits Settlements government to construct the U-shaped Government Offices along King Edward Place, Weld Quay and Beach Street.

Construction of the two-storey Neoclassical-style Government Offices occurred in several phases. The first wing along King Edward Place was built from 1884 to 1889. This was followed by an eastern extension along Weld Quay. The second phase included the construction of the Beach Street wing, which housed the Land Office, between 1890 and 1891. The Weld Quay wing was extended southward to Downing Street from 1901 to 1903.

From 1907 to 1909, the Beach Street wing was also extended southward to Downing Street. The local media at the time characterised the new extension as "abnormally hideous" and "abominations" built by "gallant but inartistic builders". After its completion, the Government Offices became the seat of government in Penang, housing the Governor's office, the General Post Office (GPO) and various government departments.

In 1945, the Government Offices were largely destroyed by Allied aerial bombardment, with only the last constructed section along Beach Street surviving. After the British retook Penang, government departments had to be temporarily relocated to nearby godowns and commercial structures. In 1962, the administrative seat of Penang was officially moved to the Tuanku Syed Putra Building. The remaining section of the Government Offices currently houses the Penang Islamic Department, a state government agency responsible for Islamic affairs within Penang.
