= Bombing of Singapore (1941) =

1941 Japanese air raid on Singapore

- Part of the Malayan Campaign, Pacific War
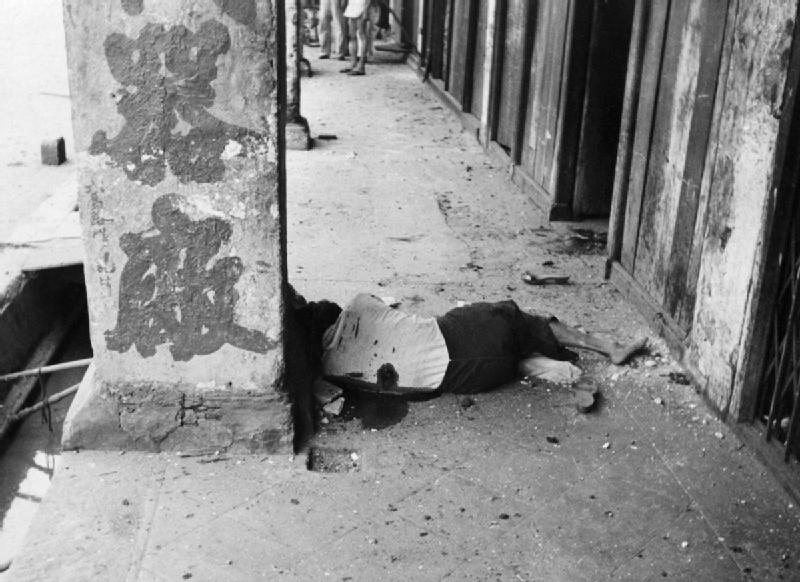
- A dead civilian lying on the floor of a five-foot way along South Bridge Road, victim of the Japanese air attack on Singapore.
Date	8 December 1941
Location	Singapore
Result	Inconclusive

Belligerents
United Kingdom: Straits Settlements; Dalforce	Japan: (Japan) Imperial Japanese Navy Air Service

Units involved
Malaya Command	Mihoro Air Group

Strength
Various number of anti-aircraft guns 1 battleship 1 battlecruiser	17 aircraft

Casualties and losses
61 killed 133 wounded	N/A

The bombing of Singapore was an attack on 8 December 1941 by seventeen G3M Nell bombers of Mihoro Air Group (Mihoro Kaigun Kōkūtai), Imperial Japanese Navy, flying from Thu Dau Mot in southern Indochina. The attack began at around 0430, shortly after Japanese forces landed on Kota Bharu, Kelantan in northern Malaya. It was the first knowledge the Singapore population had that war had broken out in the Far East.

== Background ==
The attack on Singapore was assigned to 34 bombers of Genzan Air Group (Genzan Kaigun Kōkūtai) and 31 bombers of Mihoro Air Group. Their targets were RAF Tengah, RAF Seletar, Sembawang Naval Base and Keppel Harbour.

Six squadrons from both air groups took off from southern Indochina on the night of 7 December 1941. However, bad weather conditions were encountered while over the South China Sea. Thick clouds offered poor visibility for the pilots, while rough winds caused most of the formations to become separated. After several attempts to regroup failed, Lieutenant Commander Niichi Nakanishi, Wing Commander of Genzan Air Group, ordered them to abort mission and return to base, thereby reducing the impact of a much heavier raid. Only seventeen G3M bombers of Mihoro Air Group reached Singapore on schedule, unobstructed by bad weather.

=== The Attack ===
The Japanese formation was detected by a radar station in Mersing, Johor, Malaya, almost an hour before they reached Singapore. Three Brewster Buffalo fighters of No. 453 Squadron RAAF were on standby at RAF Sembawang. However, Flight Lieutenant Tim Vigors' request to scramble and intercept the Japanese bombers was denied. Air Chief Marshal Robert Brooke-Popham feared that the anti-aircraft batteries would fire on the friendly fighters, despite Vigors being an experienced night fighter in the Battle of Britain. He was supplemented by the belief that the Buffalo fighter was only suited for daylight fighting and could not be used at night. Paradoxically, there were 12 Bristol Blenheim Mark IF night fighters of No. 27 Squadron RAF stationed in Sungai Petani, Malaya, but were being used as ground-attack aircraft.

The streets were still brightly lit despite air raid sirens going off at 0400, allowing pilot navigators to locate their targets without difficulty. Air Raid Precautions (ARP) Headquarters was not even staffed, and there was no blackout as police and power station officials could not find the employee who had the key to the switch (only two practice blackouts were conducted in September 1941 before the raid). When the bombers began their attack at 0430, Allied anti-aircraft guns immediately opened fire. The battleship Prince of Wales and battlecruiser Repulse also responded, but no aircraft was shot down. A formation of nine bombers flew over without releasing their bombs to draw the searchlights and anti-aircraft guns away from the other group. They were flying at 12,000 feet, while the second formation was at 4,000 feet.

=== Aftermath ===
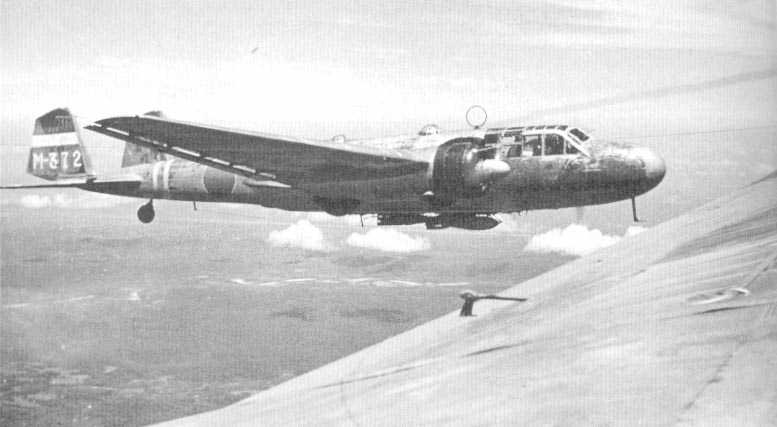
Mitsubishi G3M Nell of Mihoro Air Group, carrying bombs externally.

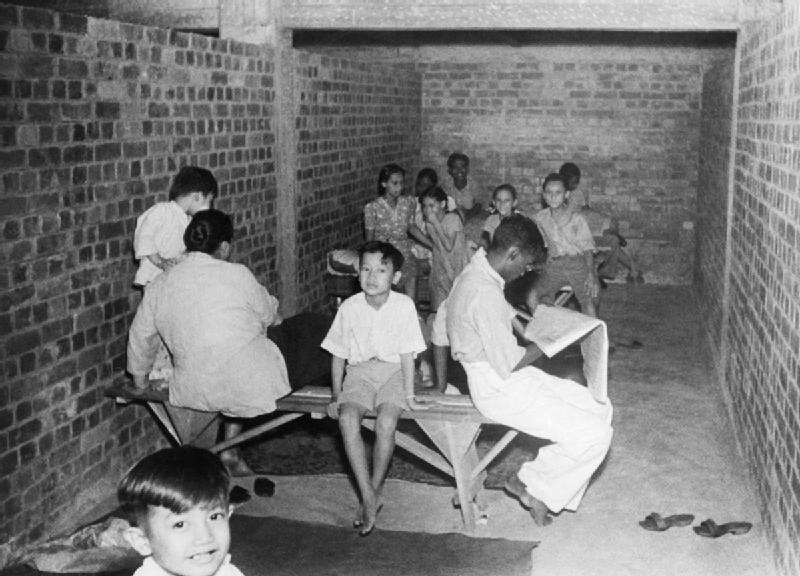
Civilians hiding in an air raid shelter at Tiong Bahru Estate during a Japanese bombing raid in December 1941.

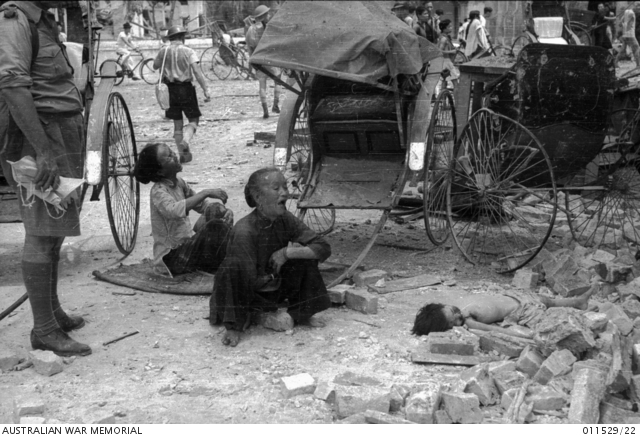
Two women grieving over a child killed in an air raid at Jinrikisha Station on 3 February 1942.

The 'Raiders Passed' signal was sent out at 0500. The bombers succeeded in bombing the airfields at Seletar and Tengah, damaging three Bristol Blenheim bombers of No. 34 Squadron RAF. A number of bombs also fell on Raffles Place. 61 people were killed and more than 700 were injured. Most of the casualties were troops of the 2/2nd Gurkha Rifles, 11th Indian Infantry Division. The Japanese bombers all returned safely to Thu Dau Mot.

Though the bombing caused only minor damage to the airfields, it stunned the British Far East Command. Despite intelligence reports of Japanese aircraft performance in the Second Sino-Japanese War, the command did not believe Japan's air forces were capable of striking Singapore from airfields more than 600 miles away in Indochina. The raid came as a surprise to Lieutenant General Arthur Percival, who "hardly expected the Japanese to have any very long-range aircraft."

Rudely awakened in the small hours of the morning by the screams of air raid sirens and the roar of ack ack guns and in the clear moonlit sky around a formation of Japanese bombers. Bombs were dropped but none fell in our area. So the war in the Far East started – all day we heard news bulletins telling of the wide spread treachery of the Japs – Well! They've asked for it – !! – Diary and 'Line' book written by the pilots of No. 453 Squadron RAAF

Singapore had respite from further air raids while the Japanese focussed their attacks on Allied positions in northern Malaya. The next raid occurred on the night of 16/17 December 1941. This was minor attack on RAF Tengah by two Japanese Ki-21s. The next serious raid on Singapore City was on the night of 29/30 December. The Japanese launched their first daylight raid on 12 January 1942, a day after their capture of Kuala Lumpur allowed them to shift aircraft of the IJAAF to southern Malaya.

== See also ==
- Battle of Singapore
- Bombing of Singapore (1944–45)
