= Air raids on Penang =

Aerial missions conducted by the Allies during World War II

Air raids on Penang (1944–1945)
- Part of the Pacific War, World War II
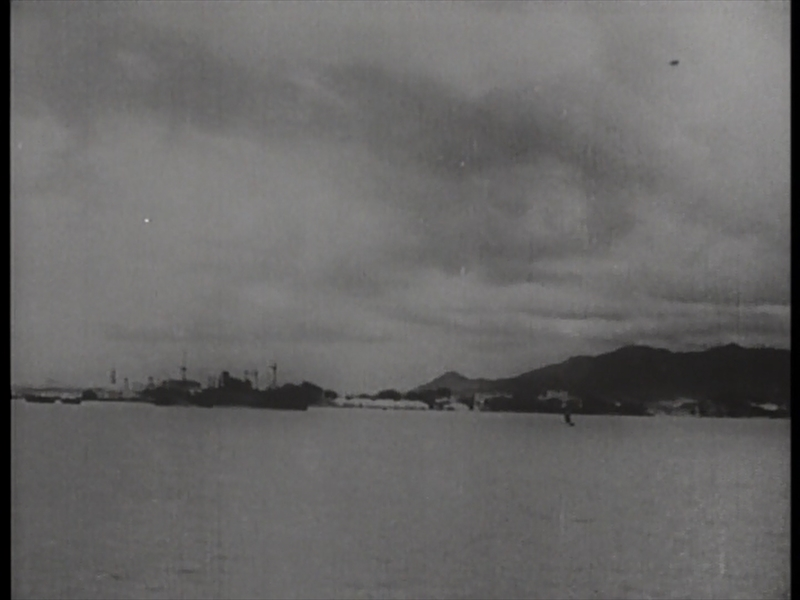
- Japanese-occupied George Town in 1944
Date	October 1944 – August 1945
Location	Penang 5.414444°N 100.329167°E
Result	Allied victory

Belligerents
United States; United Kingdom	Empire of Japan

Units involved
XX Bomber Command; No. 159 Squadron RAF; Eastern Fleet	Imperial Japanese Navy

Casualties and losses
None	Damage to naval facilities Shipping along the Penang Strait disrupted

Between 1944 and 1945, the United States Army Air Forces (USAAF) and the Royal Air Force (RAF) conducted bombing and mining missions against Japanese-occupied Penang. Carried out by long-range bombers based in India, the raids aimed to disrupt maritime shipping in the northern Strait of Malacca and the use of Penang's harbour as an Axis submarine base. While these Allied aerial missions effectively disrupted Japanese military logistics in the region, they also resulted in considerable damage to the urban landscape of George Town, Penang's capital city.

== Background ==
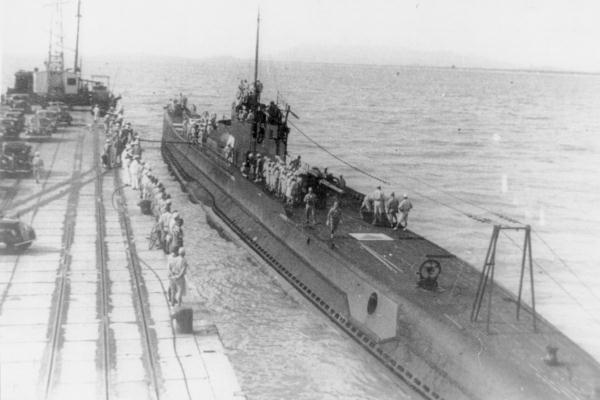
Imperial Japanese Navy submarine I-10 at Swettenham Pier in George Town c. 1942

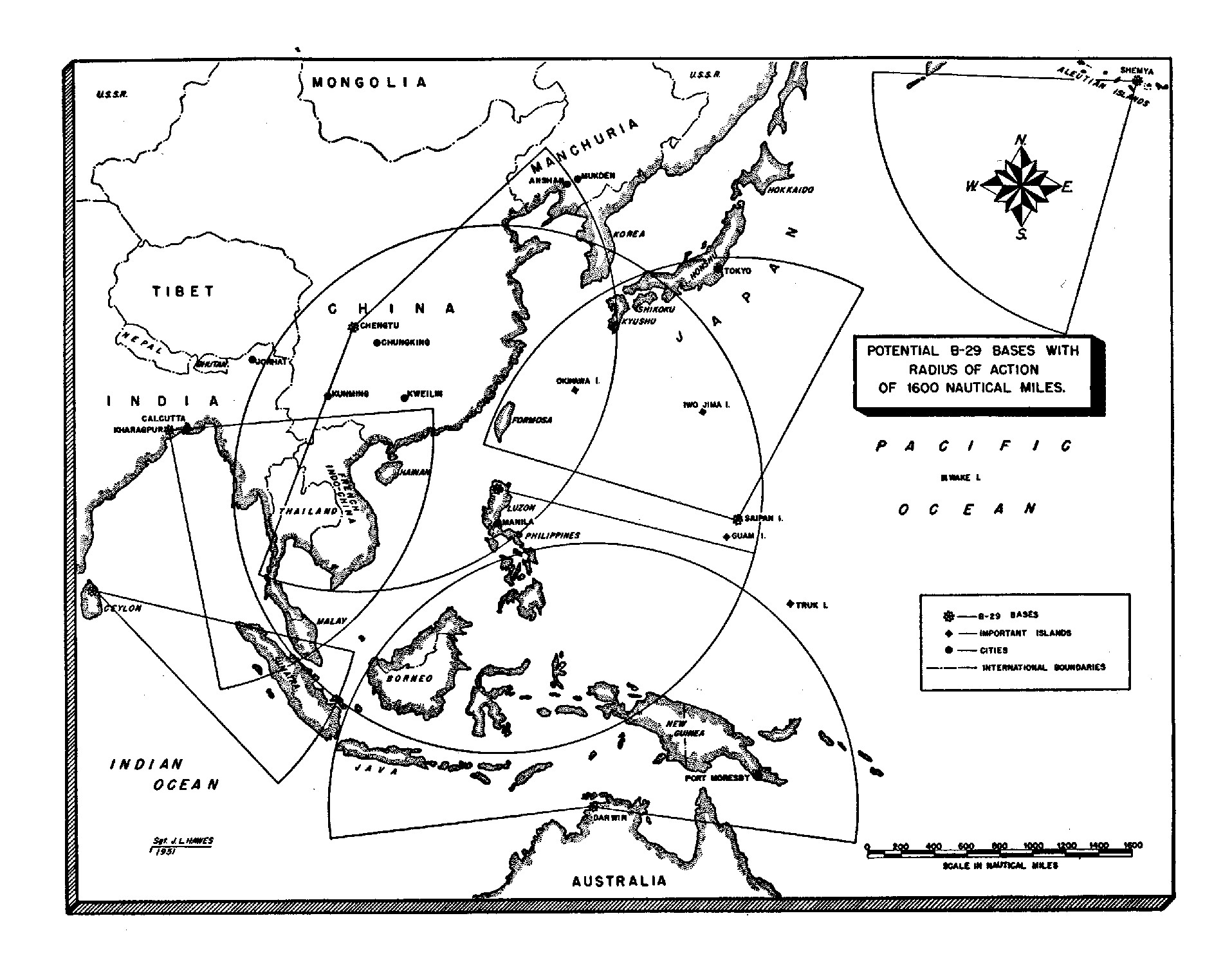
Range of Boeing B-29 Superfortresses from bases across Asia. Penang was within range of B-29s based at Kharagpur.

In November 1944, the RAF's Strategic Air Force, based in India, was reconstituted to full operational strength with the return of the Seventh Bombardment Group and several squadrons equipped with Consolidated B-24 Liberators. The operations of the Strategic Air Force were subsequently expanded to include strategic bombing and minelaying missions in Burma, Thailand and Malaya.

The British intended to disrupt maritime traffic around the northern Strait of Malacca and prevent Axis submarine squadrons from utilising Swettenham Pier in Penang's capital, George Town. Following the Japanese seizure of Penang on 19 December 1941, the pier was designated as a base for the 8th Submarine Squadron, which also facilitated long-range patrols of German and Italian submarines. However, the vast distances led to increased attrition among German submarines, which were operating at the limits of their propulsion systems. In response to Allied mining sorties in the approaches to Penang, German submarines in Southeast Asia were withdrawn to Jakarta by October 1944.

British strategic bomber forces in India were strengthened by the USAAF's XX Bomber Command, which had been established in 1943. The first Boeing B-29 Superfortresses arrived in India in April 1944. Although XX Bomber Command was primarily tasked with Operation Matterhorn, it also provided support to the Southeast Asian theatre on occasion. Industrial targets within range of the B-29 bombers stationed at Kharagpur were limited. A committee responsible for target selection in Southeast Asia suggested attacking naval installations and shipping, including George Town on account of its role as "Malaya's second harbour". In January 1945, Major General Curtis LeMay was reassigned to the Marianas and Brigadier General Roger M. Ramey assumed command of the XX Bomber Command. Under Ramey's leadership, from January to March 1945, the command increasingly redirected its operations toward targets in Southeast Asia.

== Timeline of attacks ==
Approximate targets of the Allied raids on Penang between 1944 and 1945
(Note: This map depicts Penang's modern coastline, not the World War II-era coastline.)

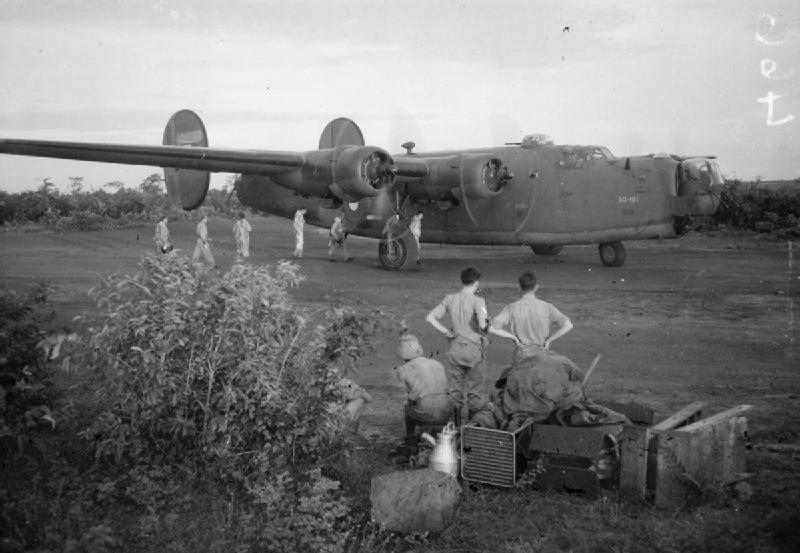
Personnel of the Royal Air Force's No. 159 Squadron preparing a Consolidated B-24 Liberator for an air raid.

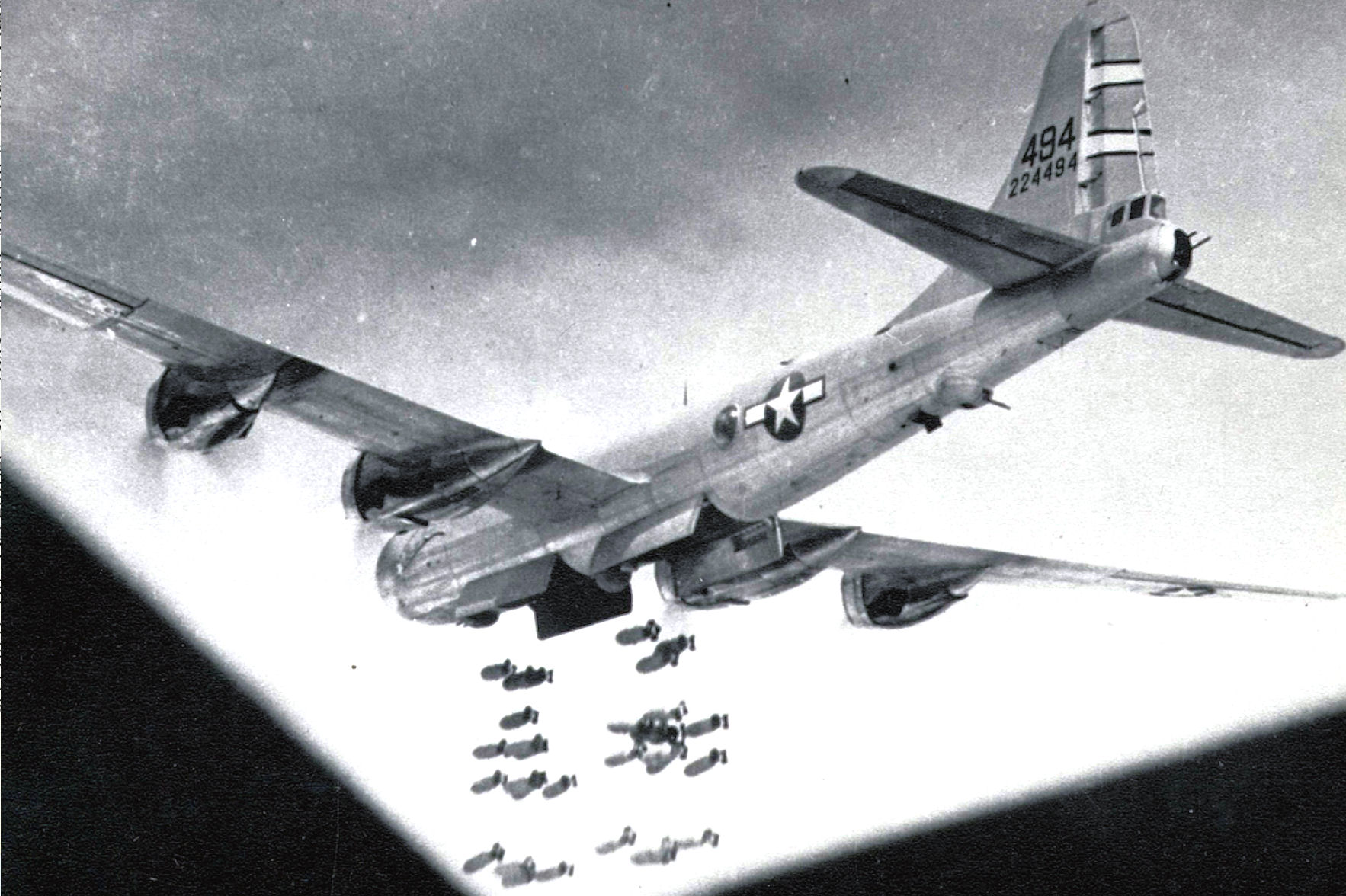
A Boeing B-29 Superfortress of the XX Bomber Command, in action over Taiwan.

=== 24 October 1944 ===
Fifteen Consolidated B-24 Liberators of the RAF's No. 159 Squadron flew from Digri to the USAAF XX Bomber Command base at Kharagpur. Upon arrival, the aircraft were loaded with 60 mines, each weighing 1,000 lb (450 kg). The bombers subsequently undertook a 20-hour, 3,000 mi (4,800 km) round trip to Penang, where the mines were deployed at the approaches of Penang's harbour "precisely in the positions ordered". No opposition was encountered and all but two aircraft returned to Digri. The two remaining bombers were forced to land in Chittagong due to malfunctioning fuel gauges.

Although British intelligence had been unable to ascertain the location of the submarine base, the mission was deemed "exceedingly praiseworthy and successful". An Air Command Southeast Asia (ACSEA) historian remarked that, "the mining operations were on a comparatively small scale but they paid dividends far in excess of what might have been expected from the effort involved". The mission effectively disrupted Japanese maritime supply routes supporting their forces fighting in Burma. In response to this emerging threat of long-range bombardment, the Imperial Japanese Navy ordered the deployment of 30 Type 3 ordnance radars and a minesweeper.

=== 11 January 1945 ===
Fifteen Boeing B-29 Superfortresses of the XX Bomber Command attacked George Town, Mergui and additional targets of opportunity. A total of 10 t (10,000 kg) of bombs were dropped in the vicinity of Fort Cornwallis, nearly completely destroying the Government Offices.

=== 26 January 1945 ===
More than 70 B-29 bombers from the XX Bomber Command conducted minelaying operations at several locations, including the approaches to Singapore, Penang, Saigon, Cam Ranh Bay, Kraburi River, Ko Sichang and Phan Rang. The Admiralty reported that 16 tons (16,000 kg) of explosives were deployed around George Town. Signals intelligence indicated that on three occasions in January, Japanese radar systems in Penang did not detect incoming B-29 bombers. This led the Japanese to speculate that "some anti-radar measures" were being utilised.

=== 1 February 1945 ===
Twenty one B-29 bombers from the XX Bomber Command struck Martaban and George Town. Commercial buildings along George Town's harbour were hit, along with the Penang library, which was looted afterward and lost over half of its archives. By the following day, George Town was largely deserted and Japanese administrators announced that residents wishing to leave the city could do so.

=== 27 February 1945 ===
A single B-29 bomber carried out minelaying operations over the Penang Strait.

=== Reconnaissance missions ===
Between February and March 1945, the Royal Navy launched Operation Stacey to gather intelligence for the planned reconquest of Malaya. Over a period of 10 days, Grumman F6F Hellcats from the escort carriers HMS Empress and HMS Ameer conducted aerial reconnaissance over the Kra Isthmus and Penang. The operation aimed to probe Japanese anti-aircraft defences and to obtain photographic documentation of the areas.

Following Japan's surrender, on 20 August, a De Havilland Mosquito carried out aerial reconnaissance of Penang and Taiping, departing from the Cocos Islands. The mission involved a 2,600 mi (4,200 km) round trip which lasted nine hours and five minutes.

== Aftermath ==
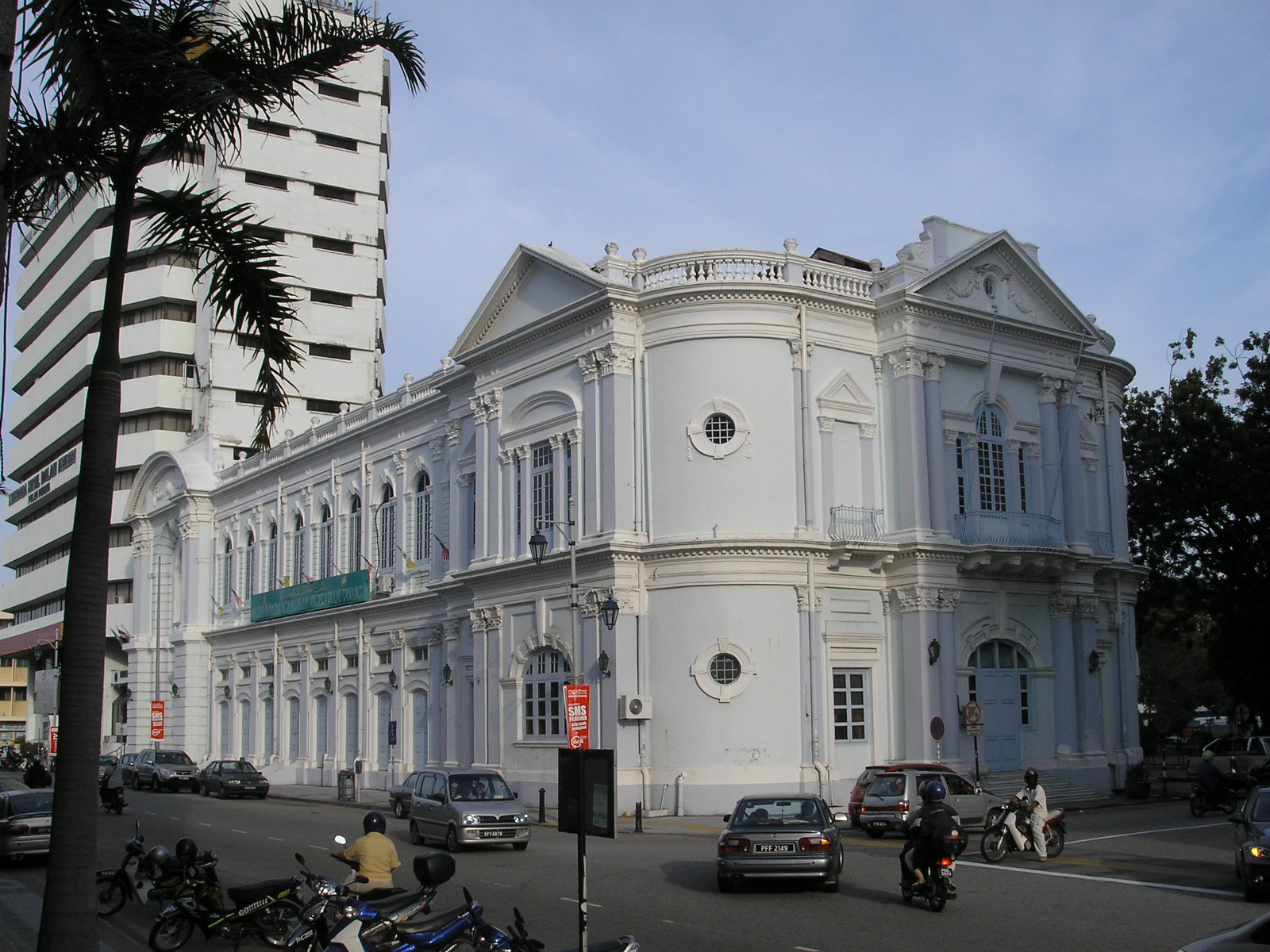
A section of the Government Offices survived the Allied bombardments and is now occupied by the Penang Islamic Department.

After the air raid on 1 February, Lord Mountbatten directed a halt to aerial bombardments targeting naval installations in Penang and Singapore. Penang was identified as a strategic access point and seaport, which Mountbatten intended to preserve to support future British amphibious operations.

Japan's surrender in August 1945 hastened British plans for the recapture of Malaya. Consequently, on 5 September, RAF's No. 185 Wing, equipped with Supermarine Spitfires, Douglas C-47 Dakotas and Mosquitoes, was deployed to Penang, which had been liberated by Royal Marine commandoes two days earlier as part of Operation Jurist. On 13 September, the RAF officially assumed garrison duties in Penang from the Royal Marines.

The Allied air raids effectively disrupted Japanese logistics around Penang, but also resulted in "considerable damage" to George Town's urban landscape. Several colonial-era landmarks were either damaged or destroyed, including the old HSBC Building, St. Xavier's Institution, the Cenotaph and the Penang Museum. A survey in 1946 by the George Town Municipal Council (predecessor to the present-day Penang Island City Council) revealed that the destruction caused by Allied high-explosive bombing was more extensive than that from the Japanese air raids in 1941, with Allied bombers rupturing water mains at a rate approximately ten times greater. In 1947, Resident Commissioner (predecessor to the present-day Governor position) Sydney Noel King proposed a revamp of urban planning due to the "considerable war damage" in the city. The present-day HSBC Building was one of the first to be reconstructed in the post-war period, leading to a gradual vertical development of George Town's cityscape.

Prior to the outbreak of the Pacific War, the U-shaped Government Offices had functioned as the administrative centre of Penang. Allied aerial bombardments destroyed much of the complex, leaving only a section intact. After the war, the returning British were forced to use the surrounding commercial buildings for administrative purposes. The dispersed governmental offices caused inefficiencies in the post-war administration of Penang, which were not addressed until the completion of the Tuanku Syed Putra Building as the new seat of government in 1962.

== See also ==
- Bombing of Kuala Lumpur (1945)
- Bombing of Singapore (1944–1945)
- Air raids on Hong Kong
