= Tuanku Syed Putra Building =

Government offices in George Town, Penang, Malaysia

- Bangunan Tuanku Syed Putra (Malay)
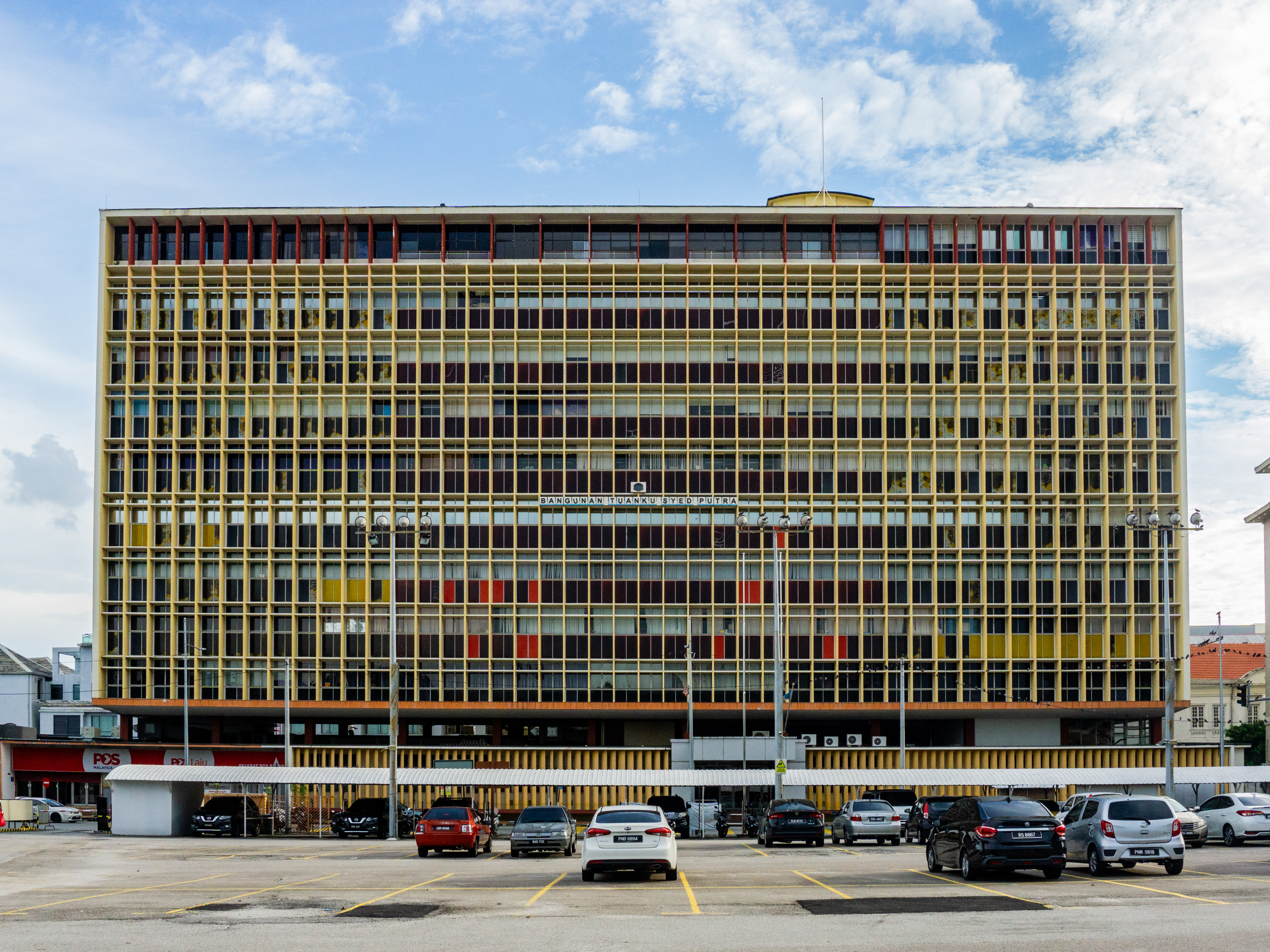
- Interactive map of the Tuanku Syed Putra Building area

General information
- Architectural style: International
- Location: Downing Street, George Town, Penang, Malaysia, George Town, Malaysia
- Coordinates: 5.4177°N 100.3439°E
- Current tenants: Malaysian federal government Pos Malaysia
- Construction started: 1959
- Completed: 1962
- Opened: 1962
- Owner: Malaysian federal government

Height
- Height: 126 ft (38 m)
- Top floor: 10

Technical details
- Floor count: 10
- Floor area: 125,000 sq ft (11,600 m^{2})
- Grounds: 1 acre (0.40 ha)

The Tuanku Syed Putra Building is an office building in George Town within the Malaysian state of Penang. Completed in 1962, the building, situated at Downing Street within the city's Central Business District (CBD), is owned by the Malaysian federal government and accommodates the Penang General Post Office (GPO). It once served as the seat of the Penang state government and, until 1966, was the tallest building in George Town.

== Background ==
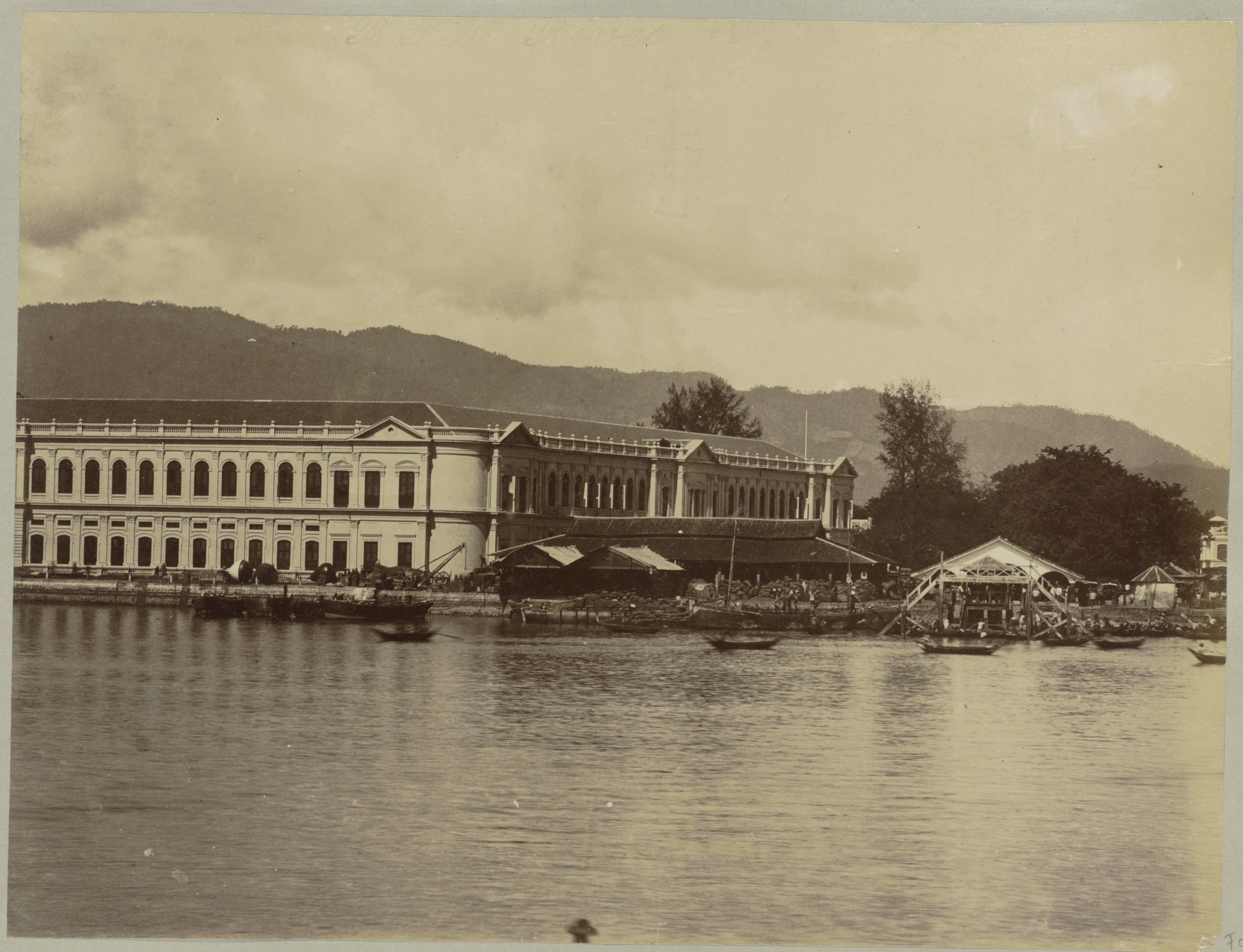
Government Offices as seen from the Penang Strait c. 1892.

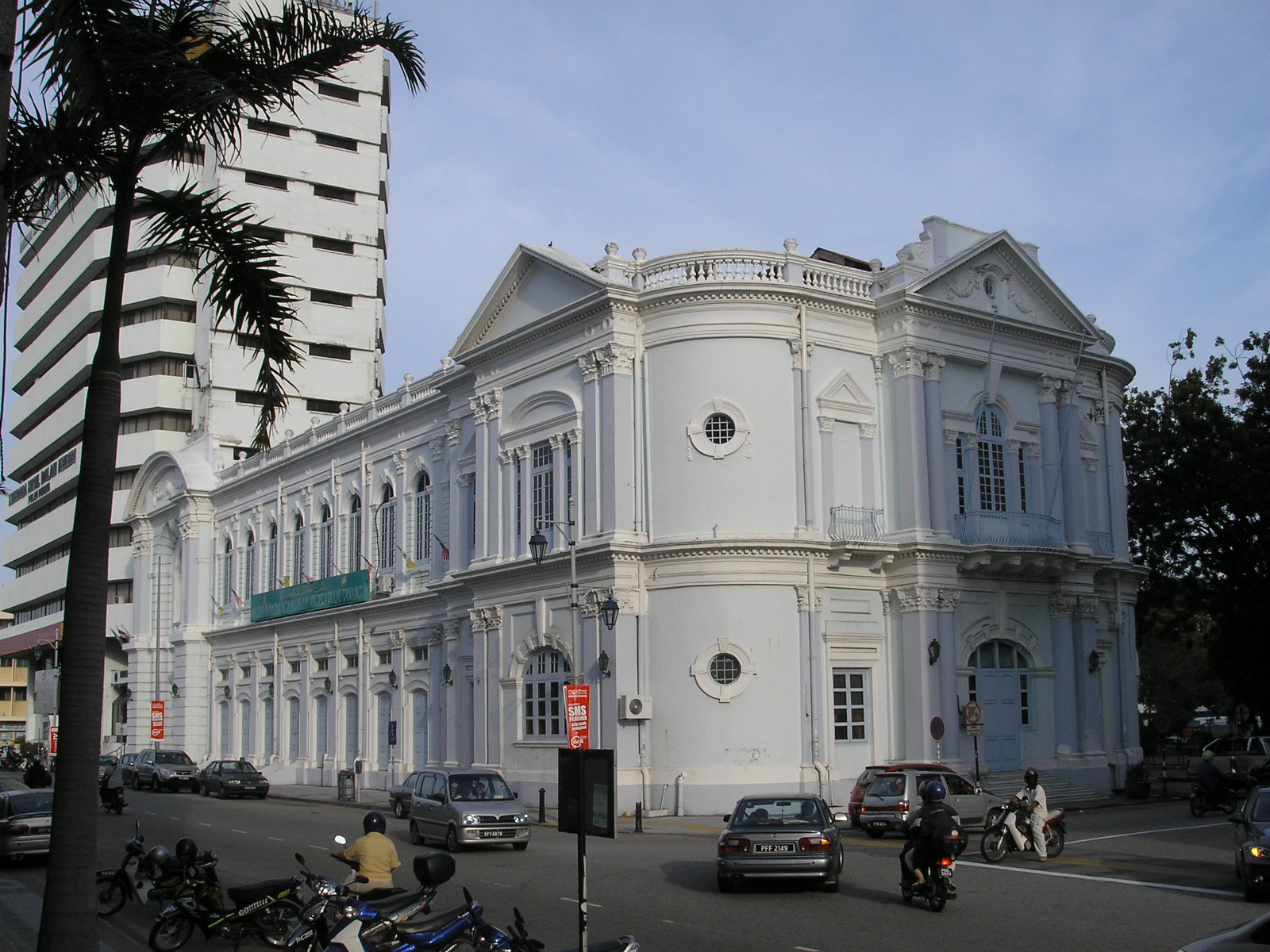
A section of the Government Offices survived the Allied bombing of Penang in 1945 and is now occupied by the Penang Islamic Department.

Prior to the Japanese invasion in 1941, the U-shaped Government Offices at the junction of Downing and Beach streets functioned as the administrative seat of Penang, then part of the British crown colony of the Straits Settlements. The complex, built in phases between 1884 and 1909, consisted of three two-storey blocks accommodating the Governor's office and various government departments.

In 1945, the Government Offices were largely destroyed by Allied aerial bombardment, with only a section (now occupied by the Penang Islamic Council) remaining. After the British recaptured Penang, administrative agencies had to be temporarily relocated to nearby Japanese-built godowns and commercial structures, resulting in inefficiencies in the post-war administration of the colony due to the dispersed offices. As the prospect of independence for the Malayan federation approached, there were proposals for a centralised office block to accommodate both federal and state departments, but plans were put on hold due to a nationwide communist insurgency.

== History ==
In 1957, the Malayan federal government allocated $1.2 million (Malaya and British Borneo dollar) for the construction of a new government office building as part of the First Malayan Five-Year Plan. The new building was planned for a 1-acre (0.40 ha) site at Downing Street where the destroyed Government Offices had stood. Construction of the new building commenced in 1959 and was expedited to meet a 1961 deadline.

The new building, designed in the International style, has a total floor area of 125,000 sq ft (11,600 m^{2}), with the Penang General Post Office (GPO) occupying 35,000 sq ft (3,300 m^{2}) on the ground floor. Office spaces make up 80,000 sq ft (7,400 m^{2}) and the remaining 10,000 sq ft (930 m^{2}) is designated for the staff canteen. Named after the then Malayan King Tuanku Syed Putra, the 10-storey building eventually cost $3.2 million.

Upon its completion in 1962, The Straits Times reported that the building "contrasts sharply with the pre-war colonial façades facing the King Edward Place, Weld Quay and Beach Street". It became the tallest building in George Town, surpassing the adjacent HSBC Building in height, and retained this status until 1966 when it was superseded by Hotel Ambassador. In addition to serving as the seat of government in Penang, the building was where the state's Justices of the Peace first organised into an association. Penang's seat of government relocated to the newly completed Komtar in 1986, while the building remains in use by federal government agencies. The Penang GPO was eventually moved to Komtar in 2025.
