= Bombing of Kuala Lumpur =

United States Army Air Forces raids in World War II

- Part of the Pacific War, World War II
Date	18 February and 10 March 1945
Location	Kuala Lumpur, Malaya
Result	Allied victory

Belligerents
United States; United Kingdom; Federated Malay States	Japan; Thailand

Units involved
XX Bomber Command	

Strength
48 or 49 aircraft (18 February); 24 or 26 aircraft (10 March)	7 fighter aircraft

Casualties and losses
None	Extensive damage to railway facilities

United States Army Air Forces B-29 Superfortress heavy bombers made two air raids on railway facilities in Japanese-occupied Kuala Lumpur during February and March 1945. The first of these attacks took place on 18 February, and involved 48 or 49 B-29s based in West Bengal. The second raid was made on 10 March by either 24 or 26 aircraft. These attacks inflicted extensive damage on the Central Railroad Repair Shops (present day KL Sentral). No American aircraft were lost in either operation.

== Background ==
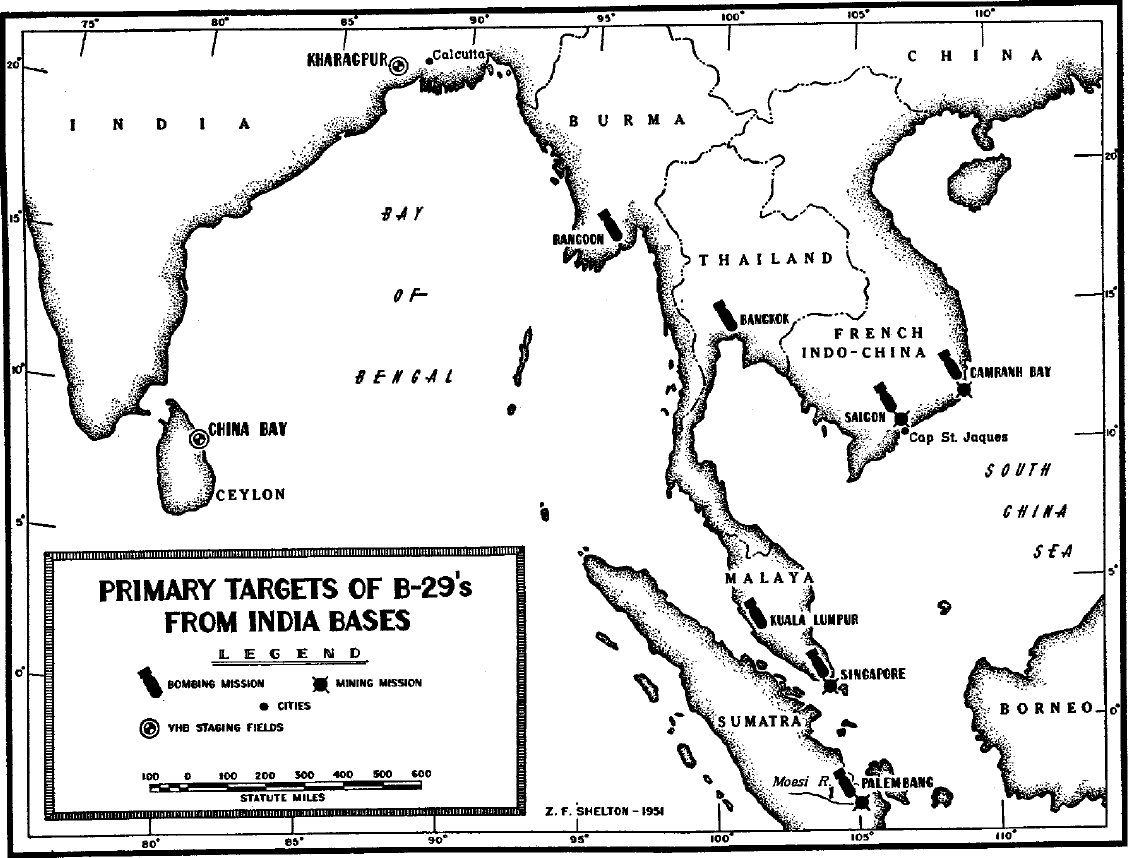
Locations of B-29 bomber bases in India and Ceylon and the main targets they attacked in South East Asia

Japanese forces captured Kuala Lumpur on 11 January 1942 during the Malayan Campaign. On 28 January that year, United States Army Air Forces (USAAF) Boeing B-17 Flying Fortress heavy bombers operating from Palembang in the Dutch East Indies bombed Japanese-held airfields near the city. Kuala Lumpur later became a key railroad center for Japanese-occupied Malaya.

In early 1944, the USAAF commenced the first deployment of its new B-29 Superfortress heavy bombers. As part of Operation Matterhorn, XX Bomber Command was based in India, and given the primary role of attacking targets in western Japan via airfields in central China. In addition, the Command was directed to also strike targets in Manchuria and East Asia.

XX Bomber Command made its first deep penetration raid into South-East Asia on the night of 9/10 August 1944, when 56 B-29s made an unsuccessful attack against oil targets near Palembang during Operation Boomerang. Attacks were also made against Singapore on 5 November and 11 January 1945. On 15 January 1945, XX Bomber Command was directed to stop flying missions via China, and instead make "limited operations" against targets in Japanese-occupied areas of South East Asia from its bases in India. This was an interim use for the command, ahead of it being redeployed to the Marianas Islands in April where it would join the main strategic bombing effort against Japan.

== Attacks ==
The B-29s made a successful attack against Japanese naval facilities at Singapore on 1 February. Preparations commenced immediately afterwards for another raid against Singapore, which was scheduled for 6 February. However, on 3 February the South East Asia Command (SEAC) directed XX Bomber Command to not make further attacks on naval facilities in Singapore or Penang as it was hoped to capture them intact later in the war. SEAC's commander Louis, Lord Mountbatten specified that several targets in the Kuala Lumpur area would instead be XX Bomber Command's primary target. Industrial facilities in and around Singapore and Saigon were identified as the secondary targets.

XX Bomber Command's first raid against Kuala Lumpur was made on 19 February. The target of this operation was the Central Railroad Repair Shops. Either 48 or 49 B-29s from the 444th and 468th Bombardment Groups arrived over the city. The force descended to an altitude below 11,000 feet (3,400 m) to get below clouds. The attack was successful, with 67 percent of buildings at the workshop being destroyed, along with railway tracks and rolling stock. Four other B-29s bombed alternate targets. All of the B-29s returned to base. As a result of this raid, many buildings in Kuala Lumpur did not display Japanese flags during a public holiday called to honour the Japanese forces in March due to fears that doing so would make them a target for any further Allied attacks.

The 468th Bombardment Group made a second attack on the Central Railroad Repair Shops on 10 March. Either 24 or 26 B-29s made the attack. As no anti-aircraft guns fired on the bombers and few Japanese fighter aircraft were encountered, the B-29s descended to 8,700 feet (2,700 m). The bombing was highly accurate, and destroyed a roundhouse, several other buildings and other railroad equipment. The nearby Selangor Museum was also severely damaged. Three other B-29s attacked Khao Huakhang and one attempted to bomb a ship near Port Swettenham. The American force did not suffer any losses.

== Aftermath ==
XX Bomber Command completed its last mission, an attack on Singapore, on 30 March. Its combat units subsequently moved to the Marianas Islands.

Not all of the bombs dropped during the attacks on Kuala Lumpur exploded, and British Army Royal Engineers units needed to clear unexploded ordnance from the Kuala Lumpur railway yards following the war. A wartime bomb exploded outside Kuala Lumpur railway station in April 1949, leaving a 20-yard (18 m)-wide crater.

== See also ==
- Bombing of Penang (1944–1945)
- Bombing of Singapore (1944–1945)
