= Battle of Kuala Lumpur =

Part of the Japanese invasion of British Malaysia (1942)

- Part of Pacific War, World War II
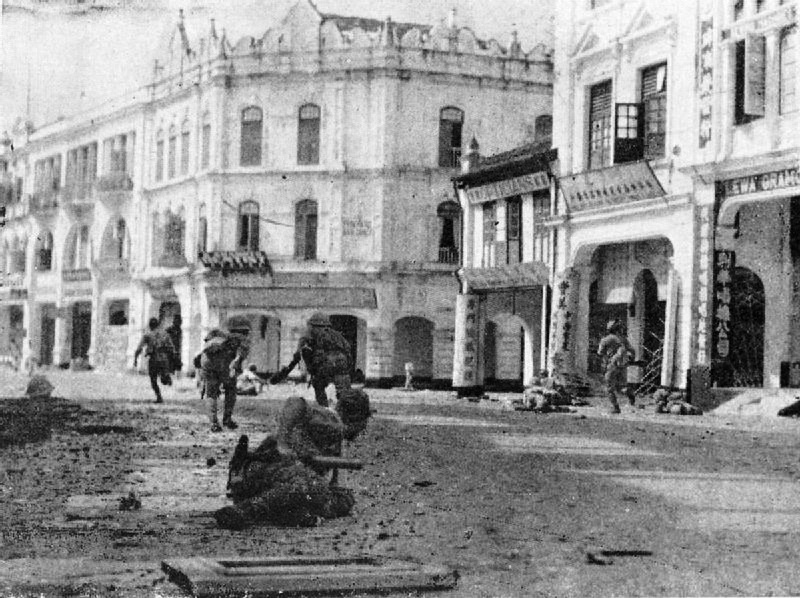
- Japanese troops advancing through Kuala Lumpur.
Date	11 January 1942
Location	Kuala Lumpur, British Malaya
Result	Japanese victory
Territorial changes	Japanese occupation of Malaya

Belligerents
United Kingdom; Federated Malay States	Japan

Commanders and leaders
Arthur Percival; Lewis Heath; Henry Gordon Bennett; Merton Beckwith-Smith	Tomoyuki Yamashita; Takuma Nishimura; Takuro Matsui; Renya Mutaguchi

Units involved
	Twenty-Fifth Army: (Empire of Japan) Imperial Guards (Empire of Japan) 5th Division (Empire of Japan) 18th Division (Empire of Japan) 3rd Air Division (Japan) 22nd Air Flotilla

Strength
Unknown	Unknown

Casualties and losses
Unknown	Unknown

The Battle of Kuala Lumpur was a battle between Japanese invasion forces and the British forces in Kuala Lumpur, in the then capital of the Federated Malay States, a British protectorate. Starting in late December Japanese began bombing the city;ground forces reached the city by 11 January 1942. The battle was part of Empire of Japan's expansive attack across the Pacific in December 1941, invading and attacking all over the Pacific, from Pearl Harbor, striking islands across the Pacific, Philippines, Malaya, Borneo, Burma, and Thailand. The invasion of Malaya leading up this battle had started after midnight on December 8 with the invasion of Kota Bharu.

== Background ==
Japanese naval aircraft launched the first air raid over Kuala Lumpur on 21 and 22 December 1941. British anti-aircraft guns and RAF aircraft intercepted the attack and shot down one Japanese aircraft and damaged another. More raids followed on the 25th and 27th. The last bombing was on 10 January 1942, after Port Swettenham fell.

By 7 January, the northern part of Malaya, including Perlis, Kedah, Kelantan, Terengganu and the Straits Settlement of Penang had fallen into Japanese hands.

After the Battle of Slim River, the Japanese troops' next military objective was Kuala Lumpur. Being the capital of the Federated Malay States it was of utmost importance to the Japanese. Kuala Lumpur by then was also the capital of the State of Selangor. The city was also home to RAF Kuala Lumpur.

== Prelude ==
On 7 January, it was decided to abandon Selangor and Negeri Sembilan to the Japanese, and British forces began a quick retreat to Johor then to Singapore. The city, now abandoned, quickly descended into a state of anarchy and chaos. Looting was widespread; the Robinsons and Whiteaway and Laidlaw department stores at Java Street were sacked by panicked KLites. Cinemas such as Cathay and Odeon at Batu Road were closed, and the Malay Mail published its last pre-war issue. The FMS administration is no longer in place.

As the British retreated, they continued the scorched earth policy they had used in Perak - tin mines, rubber plantations and munitions were simply torched. Fires continued to burn for days even after the Japanese took over Kuala Lumpur.

== Japanese entry ==
On 10 January the Japanese reached Serendah, about 26 km from Kuala Lumpur.

The following day the Japanese entered Kuala Lumpur without much resistance, besides small skirmishes. The British troops had left the city. The Japanese troops quickly took control of government and institutional buildings, such as the Sultan Abdul Samad Building, the railway station and the Pudu Jail.

After the battle, the Japanese used Pudu Jail as a POW detention centre. Many Allied POWs were tortured to death.

== Aftermath ==
Japanese troops continued their advance southward along highway 1. Kajang was bombed on 12 January; the bombs, intended for the railway station, missed, and landed on a nearby church instead.

Kuala Lumpur, with the rest of the peninsula, remained under Japanese occupation until September 1945, when the Japanese home islands surrendered unconditionally after the atomic bombings of Hiroshima and Nagasaki by American forces in August 1945. The British Military Administration took over thereafter.

Little is known about the battle, since it did not bear much significance when compared to greater battles in British Malaya such as the Battle of Singapore.

== See also ==
- Battle of Slim River
- Battle of Singapore
- Bombing of Kuala Lumpur (1945)
- Operation Tiderace (1945)
