= Downing Street, George Town =

Road in the Malaysian state of Penang

Downing Street
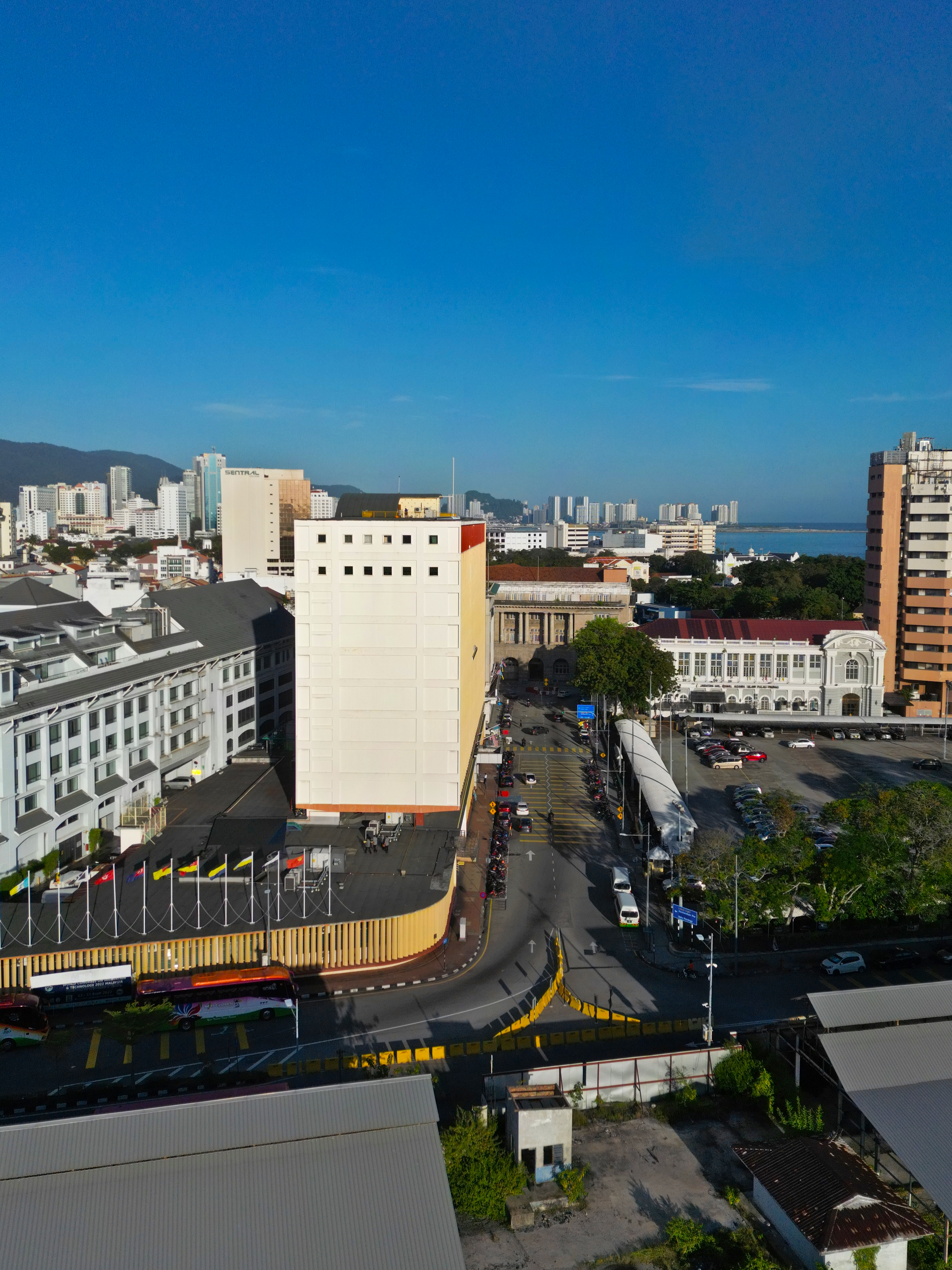
- Native name: Malay: Lebuh Downing
- Maintained by: Penang Island City Council
- Location: George Town
- Coordinates: 5.418316°N 100.343475°E
- West end: Beach Street
- East end: Weld Quay

Construction
- Inauguration: 1880s
- LEBUH DOWNING Downing St10300 P. PINANG

UNESCO World Heritage Site
- Type: Cultural
- Criteria: ii, iii, iv
- Designated: 2008 (32nd session)
- Part of: George Town UNESCO Core Zone
- Reference no.: 1223
- Region: Asia-Pacific

Downing Street is a minor side street in the city of George Town within the Malaysian state of Penang. It is one of the few places worldwide that share an identical name with London's famous Downing Street, where the official residence of the British prime minister is located.

Created in the late 19th century, the Straits Settlements government built an administrative complex along the street. Thus, as is the case in London, Downing Street in George Town was once the seat of government in Penang.

== History ==
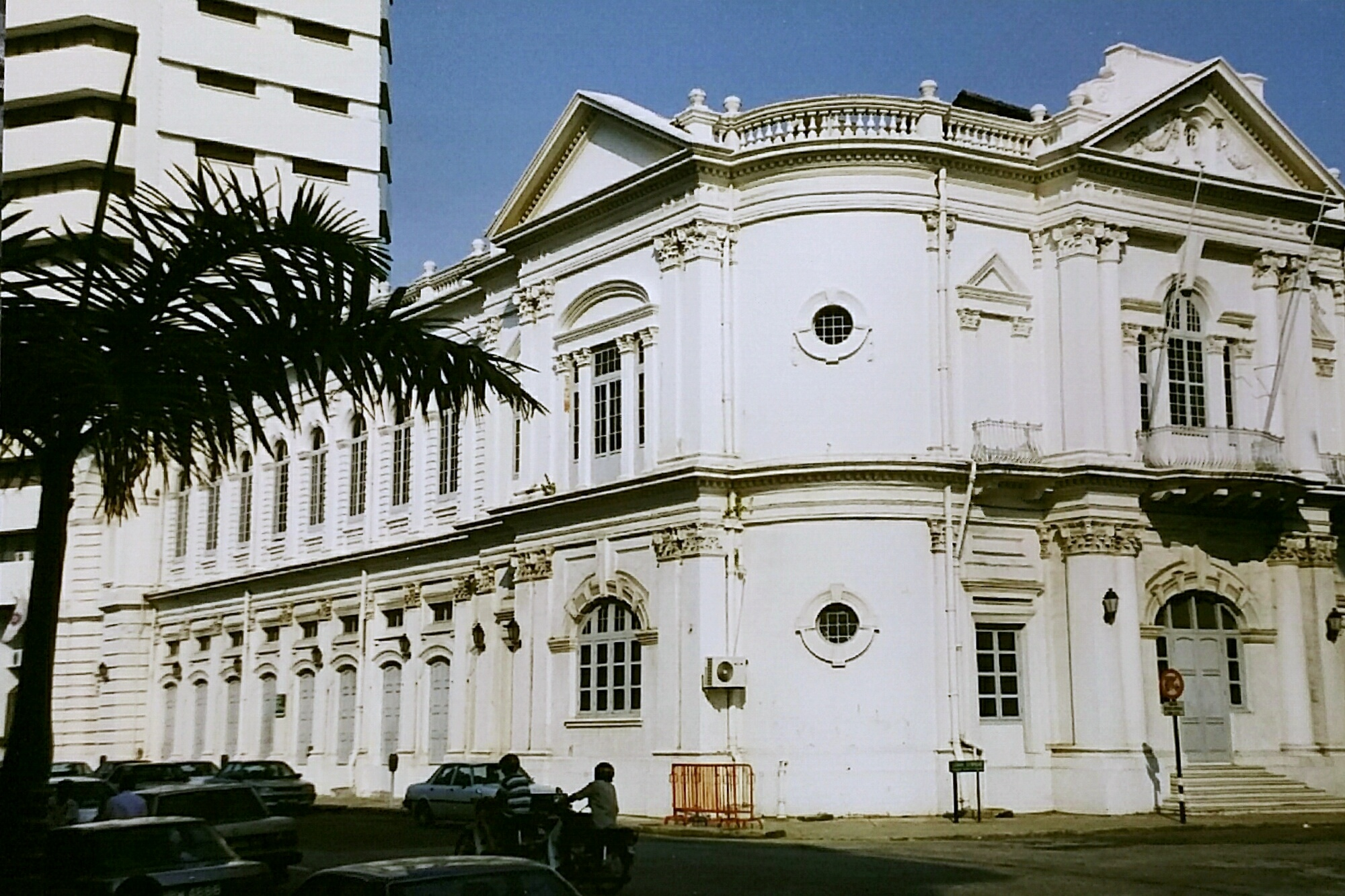
The only surviving portion of the Straits Settlements-built Government Offices has since been converted into the Penang Islamic Council offices.

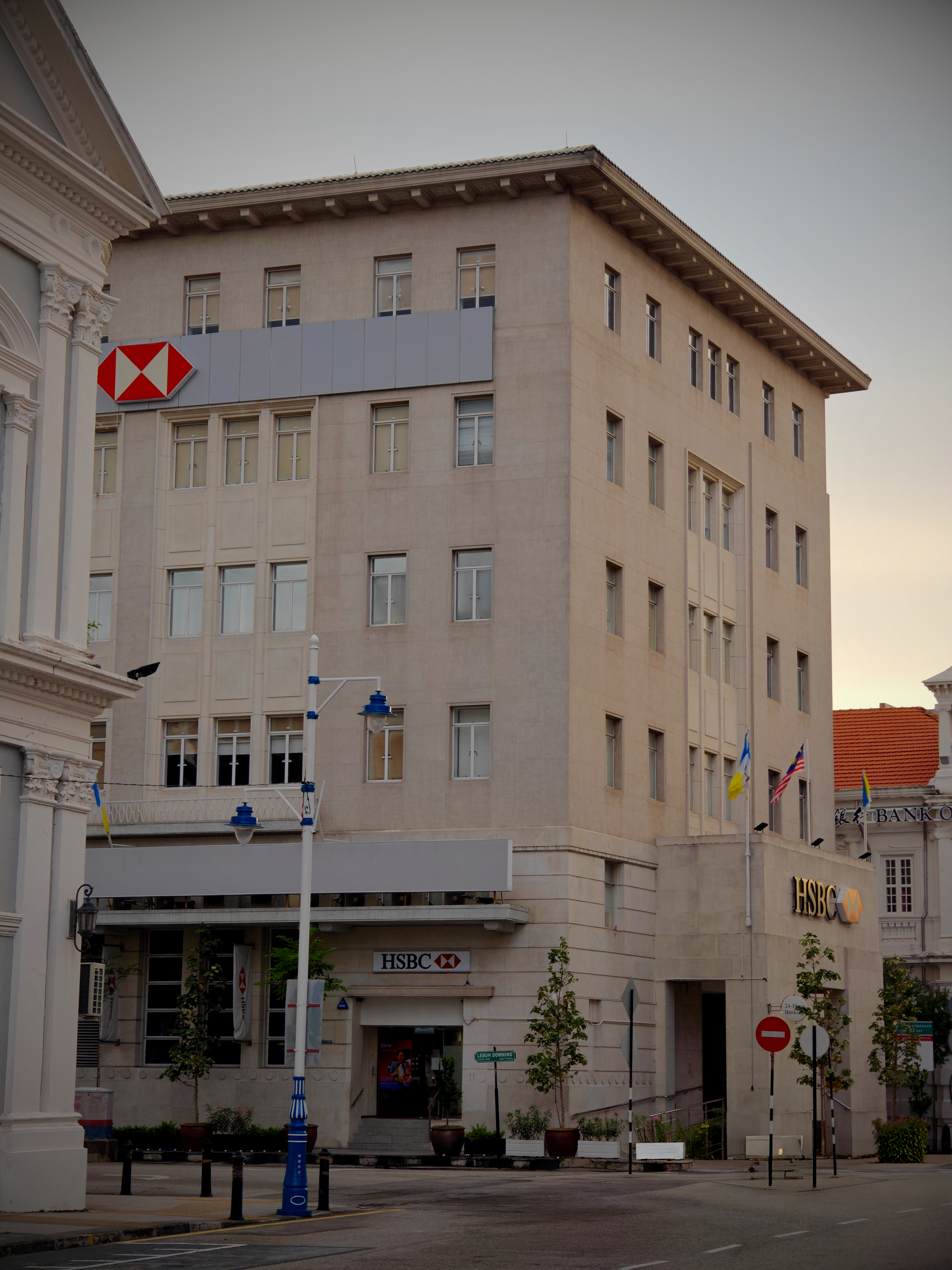
HSBC Bank Building, completed in 1951, replaces an older building which was obliterated during World War II.

Originally, the area where Downing Street now runs through does not exist; the sea reached all the way up to Beach Street, making the latter the eastern coastal road of George Town. This particular area was created through a massive land reclamation project in the 1880s, which also created Weld Quay and expanded the harbour facilities required for the booming entrepôt trade at the time.

Downing Street was envisioned as part of George Town's civic precinct, and between 1889 and 1907, the government of the Straits Settlements constructed the U-shaped Government Offices along Downing Street. The Government Offices included the Resident Councillor's Office, the Audit Office, the Public Works Department and the Marine Department, as well as the Land Office in its western wing and a post office in the eastern wing.

Other than the Government Offices, the British authorities also built other administrative buildings along Downing Street, such as the Education Department, the Treasury Office and the Indian Immigration Depot. This concentration of administrative functions effectively made Downing Street the administrative centre of the Straits Settlement of Penang.

In 1906, the original HSBC Building at the junction with Beach Street was completed.

However, most of this colonial architecture were destroyed during World War II. Japanese and Allied bombers repeatedly attacked this particular location due to its importance as Penang's administrative heart, causing the almost total destruction of the Government Offices. The other administrative buildings and the HSBC Building were completely destroyed by the end of the war.

Only one part of the Government Offices remain standing to this day. This section of the former Government Offices now houses the Penang Islamic Council offices. The present HSBC Building was also rebuilt and completed in 1951.

== Landmarks ==
- HSBC Building
- Tuanku Syed Putra Building
- Penang Islamic Council Building (formerly part of the Government Offices)

== See also ==
- List of roads in George Town
- Architecture of Penang
