= Bombing of Singapore (1944–1945) =

World War II military campaign

- Part of the Pacific War, World War II
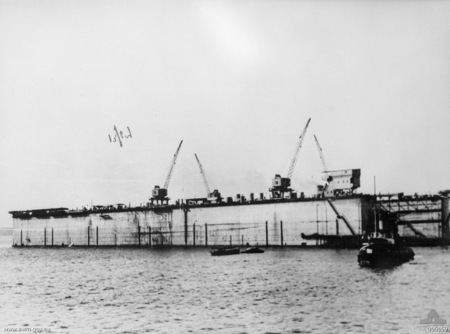
- Admiralty Floating Dock IX at Singapore Navy Base during March 1941. This dry dock was the target of two USAAF raids in 1945
Date	5 November 1944 – 24 May 1945
Location	Singapore and nearby waters 1.3667°N 103.8000°E
Result	Allied victory

Belligerents
United States; United Kingdom	Empire of Japan

Units involved
XX Bomber Command; No. 222 Group RAF	Anti-aircraft artillery and fighter units

Casualties and losses
9 bombers destroyed	Damage to naval, dockyard and oil storage facilities At least four ships destroyed and 11 damaged

The Bombing of Singapore (1944–1945) was a military campaign conducted by the Allied air forces during World War II. United States Army Air Forces (USAAF) long-range bomber units conducted 11 air raids on Japanese-occupied Singapore between November 1944 and March 1945. Most of these raids targeted the island's naval base and dockyard facilities, and minelaying missions were conducted in nearby waters. After the American bombers were redeployed, the British Royal Air Force assumed responsibility for minelaying operations near Singapore, which continued until 24 May 1945.

The raids had mixed results. While significant damage was inflicted on Singapore's important naval base and commercial port, some raids on these targets were not successful and other attacks on oil storage facilities on islands near Singapore were ineffective. The minelaying campaign disrupted Japanese shipping in the Singapore area and resulted in the loss of three vessels and damage to a further ten, but was not decisive. The Allied air attacks were successful in raising the morale of Singapore's civilian population, who believed that the raids marked the impending liberation of the city. The overall number of civilian casualties from the bombings was low, though civilian workers were killed during attacks on military facilities; one attack rendered hundreds of people homeless.

== Background ==
In the decades after World War I, Britain expanded Singapore Naval Base at Sembawang on Singapore's north coast as part of plans to deter Japanese expansionism in the region (the Singapore strategy). The resulting facility was among the most important in the British Empire and included the large King George VI graving dock and Admiralty No.IX floating dry dock. The Commonwealth forces allocated to Malaya and Singapore were swiftly defeated in the months after the outbreak of the Pacific War, however, and the island was surrendered to the Japanese on 15 February 1942. Singapore was bombed by Japanese aircraft on a number of occasions during the Battle of Malaya and subsequent fighting on the island itself; these raids caused many civilian deaths.

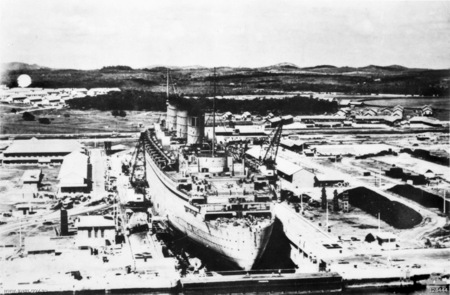
The ocean liner Queen Mary in the King George VI Graving Dock during August 1940

Singapore Naval Base suffered little damage during the fighting in 1941 and 1942, and became the most important facility of the Imperial Japanese Navy (IJN) outside the Japanese home islands. As was the case under British rule, many locally recruited civilians worked in the base, though the Japanese Navy subjected them to harsh discipline which included physical beatings for minor mistakes as well as imprisonment or execution for theft and leaks of information. The Japanese Second Fleet and Third Fleet were transferred from the central Pacific to Singapore and the nearby Lingga Islands between February and April 1944 to be closer to their sources of fuel oil. These two fleets comprised the main body of the IJN, and operated most of its remaining battleships and aircraft carriers.

The forces allocated to the defence of Singapore were not strong. In early 1945, Japanese air defences for the island included only two Army companies equipped with automatic cannon, some IJN anti-aircraft units, and a small number of fighter aircraft. Some of the anti-aircraft guns were crewed by Malay auxiliaries. The effectiveness of what was already an inadequate air defence force was hindered by a lack of coordination between the Army and Navy, shortages of fire control equipment for the guns, and no fire-control radar or barrage balloons being available. Defence against night raids was particularly weak as no night fighters were stationed near Singapore and coordination between the anti-aircraft guns and searchlight units was poor.

In June 1944, the USAAF's XX Bomber Command began flying combat operations with B-29 Superfortress heavy bombers from air bases near Kharagpur in northeastern India. Although the Command's primary role was to attack industrial targets in the Japanese home islands, approximately 50 percent of its missions were undertaken to support other Allied operations in the Pacific. The XX Bomber Command reported to the USAAF's Twentieth Air Force, which was personally directed from Washington, D.C., by the commander of the USAAF General Henry H. Arnold, rather than the Allied theatre commanders in India and China. Major General Curtis LeMay assumed command of XX Bomber Command on 29 August after Arnold relieved its first commander.

Following the Japanese defeat in the Battle of Leyte Gulf in late October 1944, the remnants of the IJN were concentrated into two groups of ships. One group returned to bases in the Inland Sea, while the other was stationed at the Lingga Islands. On 27 October, Arnold suggested to LeMay that the Japanese defeat at Leyte might have increased the importance of Singapore's naval facilities and asked whether XX Bomber Command could attack targets on the island. Little recent intelligence on Singapore was available, and on 30 October a photo-reconnaissance B-29 overflew Singapore for the first time and took good photos of the island. Despite this success, LeMay's staff believed that a daylight attack on Singapore—which required a 4,000 mi (6,400 km) round trip from Kharagpur—could not be successful. Regardless, Arnold ordered that XX Bomber Command attack Singapore.

== Raids ==
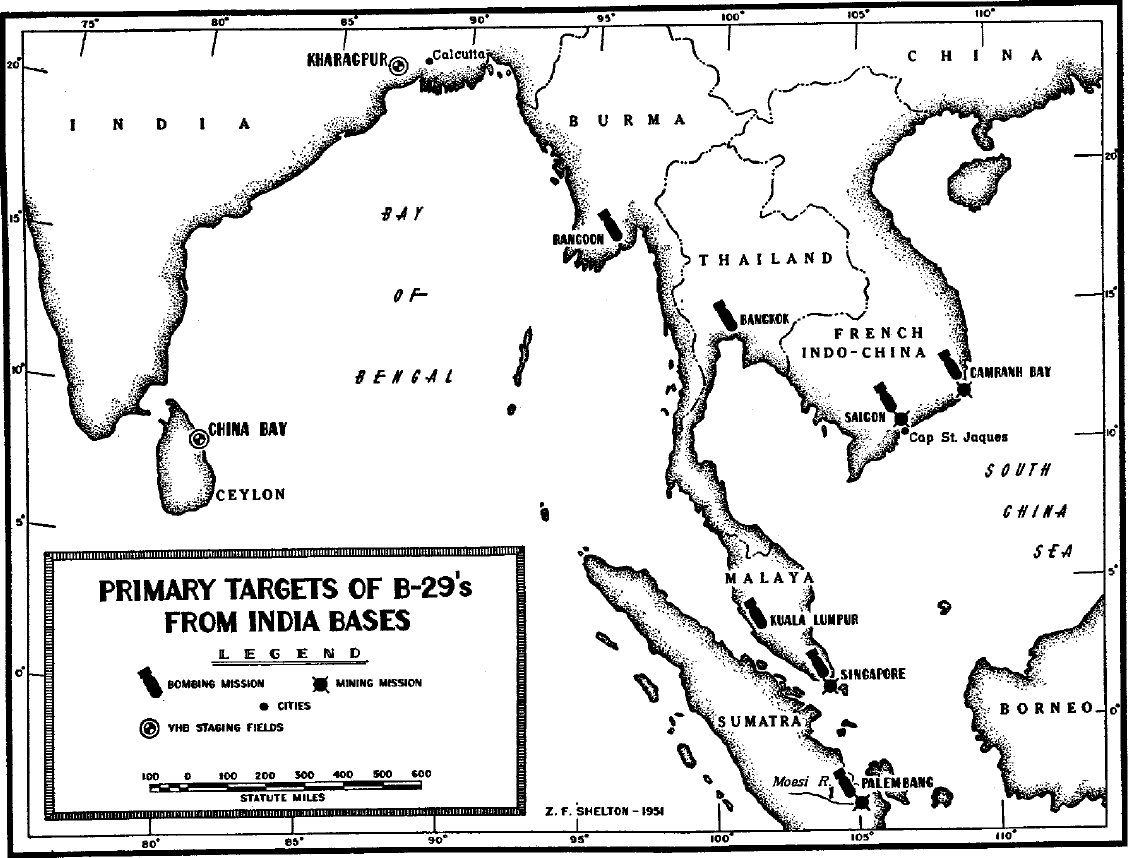
Locations of B-29 bomber bases in India and Ceylon and the main targets they attacked in Southeast Asia

=== Initial attack ===
The first raid on Singapore took place on 5 November 1944. XX Bomber Command dispatched 76 B-29s from their bases around Kharagpur. Because of the extreme range to the target, the aircraft were each armed with only two 1,000 pound bombs; pilots were also instructed to bomb from the lower-than-normal altitude of 20,000 ft (6,100 m), and to maintain a loose formation. The raid's primary target was the King George VI Graving Dock, and the Pangkalanbrandan refinery in northern Sumatra was assigned as the secondary target.

The first B-29s arrived over Singapore Naval Base at 06:44. Bombing was highly accurate, with the lead aircraft putting a bomb within 50 ft (15 m) of the graving dock's caisson gate. The third B-29's bombs landed nearby and other aircraft also scored direct hits on the graving dock, rendering it unserviceable for three months. The bombs which landed in and near the King George VI Graving Dock also damaged the 465 ft (142 m) freighter that was under repair in it at the time. Many of the civilian workers in and around the dock were unable to escape and were killed. The raiders also inflicted damage on other facilities in the naval base. Overall, 53 Superfortresses bombed Singapore Naval Base while seven attacked Pangkalanbrandan refinery. Few Japanese anti-aircraft guns or aircraft fired on the raiders, but two B-29s were lost in accidents. This raid was the longest daylight bombing operation to have been conducted up to that time. Following the attack, Japanese soldiers murdered a group of injured Indonesian workers. The damage to the King George VI Graving Dock meant that it could not be used to repair the Japanese battleships damaged at the Battle of Leyte Gulf.

=== Later bombing raids ===
The next raid on Singapore took place in January 1945. Following reports that Japanese warships damaged during the Philippines Campaign were being repaired at Singapore, a force of 47 Superfortresses was dispatched from India to attack the Admiralty IX Floating Dock as well as the King's Dock on the island's south coast. These aircraft took off at about midnight on 10 January and began to arrive over Singapore at 08:20 on 11 January. Only 27 of the attackers struck the docks, and due to heavy anti-aircraft fire from Japanese warships in the Straits of Johor the bombers did not cause any damage. The other aircraft bombed Penang in Malaya, Mergui in Burma and several targets of opportunity, generally without success. Two B-29s were lost during this operation.

In January 1945, XX Bomber Command began preparations to redeploy to the Mariana Islands. The Command ceased its attacks on Japan and East Asia, for which it used bases in China to refuel the B-29s en route to their targets, and instead focused on targets in Southeast Asia that could be reached from Kharagpur. As there were few industrial targets within range of Kharagpur, the highest priority was given to attacking shipping in major ports such as Rangoon, Bangkok and Singapore as well as smaller harbours. Attacks were conducted through both conventional bombing and laying naval mines. As part of the transition, LeMay departed for the Mariana Islands on 18 January and was replaced by Brigadier General Roger M. Ramsey.

XX Bomber Command conducted a major conventional bombing raid on Singapore Naval Base on 1 February. On that day, 112 B-29s were dispatched, each armed with four 1,000 lb (450 kg) bombs. The raid's primary target, the Admiralty IX Floating Dock, was bombed by 67 of the 88 aircraft that reached Singapore. This attack sank the dry dock and destroyed the 460 ft (140 m) ship berthed inside it. The other 21 aircraft that attacked Singapore bombed the West Wall area of the naval base and destroyed many buildings and some heavy equipment; this area housed the base's main offices. Of the remaining aircraft, 20 diverted and attacked targets in Penang and Martaban. A Japanese fighter shot down one of the B-29s and another Superfortress was destroyed on landing after suffering damage from air attack.

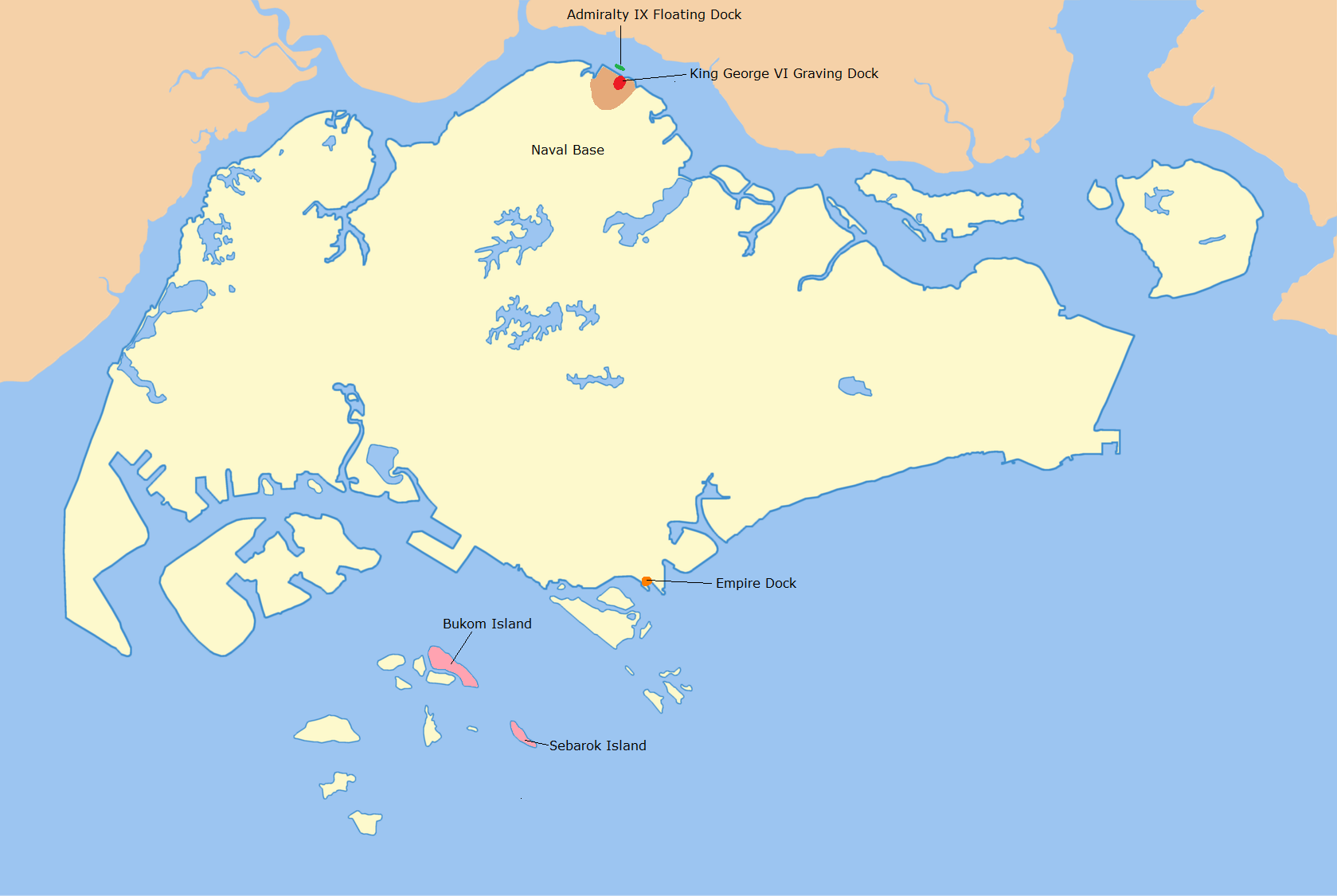
Primary targets of the USAAF raids on Singapore. (Note: This map depicts Singapore's modern coastline, not the World War II-era coastline.)

Although XX Bomber Command began preparations to attack on Singapore Naval Base again on 6 February, this raid was cancelled on the third of the month by Admiral Louis Mountbatten, the commander of Allied forces in the Southeast Asian theatre. Mountbatten ordered that the naval installations at Singapore and Penang not be targeted as they would be needed by Allied forces following the projected liberation of Malaya and Singapore later in 1945. After requesting clarification of this order, Ramsey met with Mountbatten at Kandy. In this meeting Mountbatten assigned targets in the Kuala Lumpur area as XX Bomber Command's first priority, while second priority was given to carefully selected areas of Singapore. These areas excluded the King George VI Graving Dock and several other docks and areas with heavy machinery, but allowed attacks on the West Wall area of Singapore Naval Base, naval oil stores and commercial dock facilities. Saigon was assigned as XX Bomber Command's third priority and fourth priority was given to oil storage dumps on islands near Singapore.

The next bombing raid on Singapore took place on 24 February. On that day, 116 B-29s were dispatched to bomb the Empire Dock area at Singapore's southern tip. This was a commercial dock, and was considered by XX Bomber Command planners to be "the only suitable primary target free of stipulations left in this theatre". The bombers were armed with incendiary bombs, and the 105 B-29s which reached Singapore succeeded in burning out 39 percent of the warehouse area near the dock. Several oil storage tanks were also severely damaged. As a result of the target being obscured by smoke, 26 of the B-29s used blind rather than visual bombing, resulting in poor accuracy and damage to civilian residential and commercial areas near the dock area. More than 100 commercial and residential buildings were destroyed. The Syonan Shimbun newspaper subsequently reported that 396 people had been made homeless by the raid. USAAF losses were limited to a single B-29 which crashed after running out of fuel on its way back to India.

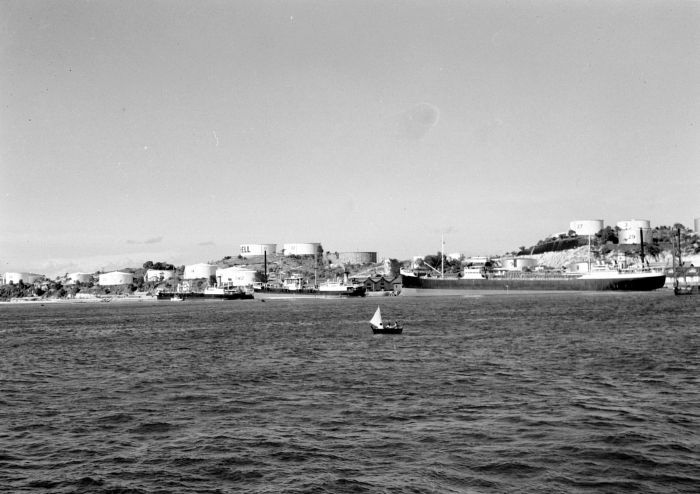
The oil tanks at Samboe Island (pictured in 1936) were one of the targets attacked on 12 March 1945

XX Bomber Command attacked Singapore again on 2 March. As many of the Command's service units were en route to the Marianas, only 64 B-29s could be dispatched. These aircraft targeted the shop and warehouse area in Singapore Naval Base with 500 lb (230 kg) bombs. The 49 B-29s which reached Singapore bombed this area and added to the damage caused by earlier raids, but the results of the attack were again limited by anti-aircraft fire from Japanese warships. Two B-29s were shot down by anti-aircraft guns.

The final two raids conducted by XX Bomber Command before it deployed to the Marianas targeted oil storage facilities on islands in the Singapore area. On 12 March, three B-29 groups were dispatched to attack Bukom and Sebarok islands just off the south coast of Singapore as well as Samboe Island, which is a few miles south near Batam Island in the Dutch East Indies. Each of the groups was assigned a different island and no Japanese anti-aircraft guns or fighters were encountered. Despite this, poor weather meant that the 44 B-29s which reached the target area had to use blind bombing techniques and their attacks caused little damage. The command's final attack before it departed for the Marianas took place on the night of 29/30 March when 29 Superfortresses were sent to attack Bukom Island. In order to train the aircrew for the low-level tactics which were being used against the Japanese home islands, the bombers attacked their targets individually from altitudes between 5,000 ft (1,500 m) and 7,000 ft (2,100 m). This raid destroyed seven of the 49 oil tanks in the island, and a further three were damaged. No B-29s were lost in either attack.

In early August P-38 Lightnings carried out several raids over Singapore. Two Japanese fighters were shot down by the P-38's as were two P-38's by Japanese fighters.

=== Minelaying near Singapore ===
As part of its campaign against shipping, around each full moon from late January 1945 XX Bomber Command conducted minelaying missions. On the night of 25/26 January, 41 B-29s from the 444th and 468th Bombardment Groups laid six minefields in the approaches to Singapore. On the same night other B-29s laid mines off Saigon and Cam Ranh Bay as part of the largest single aerial minelaying effort in the Pacific up to that time. On the night of 27/28 February, twelve B-29s were dispatched to lay mines in the Straits of Johor near Singapore. Ten of these aircraft successfully deployed 55 mines in the target area, and another aircraft mined Penang. During the next full moon period on the night of 28/29 March, 22 B-29s laid mines near Singapore. No aircraft were lost during these missions.

Following the withdrawal of XX Bomber Command, the British Royal Air Force's No. 222 Group assumed responsibility for minelaying operations in the Singapore area using B-24 Liberator bombers. Minelaying ceased on 24 May so that unswept mines did not interfere with the planned British-led landings in Malaya which were scheduled for September. The Japanese established observation posts on islands in the Singapore Strait to spot minefields, but these were not effective and generally the fields were not detected until a ship struck a mine. In total, air-dropped mines sank three ships near Singapore and damaged another ten. Moreover, the minefields disrupted Japanese convoy routes and efforts to repair ships. The Allied minelaying campaign was too brief to achieve decisive results, however.

== Aftermath ==
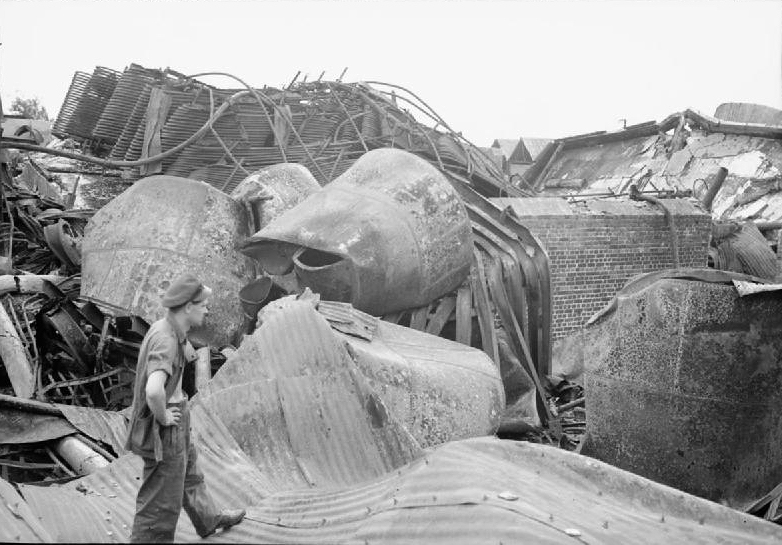
A Royal Air Force motor transport driver surveys damage caused by Allied bombing at Singapore docks, September 1945

XX Bomber Command's attacks on Singapore produced mixed results. The raids on Singapore Naval Base damaged or destroyed many workshops and denied the Japanese the use of the King George VI Graving Dock between late 1944 and early 1945, and the Admiralty IX Dry Dock from February 1945. In addition, workers at the Naval Base did not return to work for some time after each raid, and had to be provided with better pay and rations and additional air-raid shelters. Although the damage inflicted on the Empire Docks area impeded Japanese port operations, the poor condition of the port area also hindered British efforts to rehabilitate Singapore following the war. The attacks on the oil storage tanks on islands near Singapore were less successful, and many were found to still be operable after the Japanese surrender.

The Japanese military's efforts to defend Singapore from air attack were unsuccessful. Due to the weak state of the island's air defences, only nine B-29s were shot down during the American campaign, all of them during daylight raids. Minesweeping operations were also slow, and it took three weeks to declare the port safe after each Allied minelaying raid. The surviving crew members of the American bombers that were shot down met varying fates; a small number linked up with resistance movements such as the Malayan Peoples' Anti-Japanese Army, while others were captured by the Japanese and held in harsh conditions. Those who were captured by the IJN and held at the Naval Base were beheaded. After the war, the Japanese personnel believed responsible for atrocities against these prisoners were tried during the Seletar War Crimes Trials and those found guilty were executed or served long prison sentences.

The air raids on Singapore raised the morale of the island's civilian population. They were seen as heralding Singapore's liberation from Japan's oppressive rule, though civilians were generally careful to hide this belief from Japanese occupation personnel. The B-29s were widely believed to be invulnerable, and civilians were cheered by their apparent ability to attack the Japanese at will. In an attempt to counter this view, the occupation authorities exhibited wreckage from downed B-29s and surviving crew members as well as film footage of a Superfortress being shot down. This propaganda campaign was not successful. The Japanese also failed in their attempts to rouse Singapore's Muslim population against the raids by highlighting damage suffered by a mosque on 11 January and 24 February, the latter a raid which coincided with the celebration of Muhammad's birthday. Another factor which contributed to public support for the raids was that the policy of targeting military installations meant that only a small number of civilians became casualties, and the American bombing came to be seen as highly accurate. The expectation of further attacks caused the prices of food and other commodities to rise, however, as people stockpiled necessities; Japanese attempts to stop this hoarding and profiteering were not successful.

== See also ==
- Bombing of Penang (1944–1945)
- Bombing of Kuala Lumpur (1945)

== Bibliography ==
- Bayly, Christopher; Harper, Tim (2004). Forgotten Armies: Britain's Asian Empire & the War with Japan. London: Penguin Books. ISBN 0-14-029331-0.
- Cate, James Lea (1953). "The Twentieth Air Force and Matterhorn". In Craven, Wesley Frank; Cate, James Lea (eds.). Volume Five. The Pacific: Matterhorn to Nagasaki June 1944 to August 1945. The Army Air Forces in World War II. Chicago and London: The University of Chicago Press. OCLC 9828710.
- Chilstrom, John S. (1993). Mines away!: The Significance of US Army Air Forces Minelaying in World War II. Air University thesis series. Darby, Pennsylvania: DIANE Publishing. ISBN 1-4289-1533-8.
- Dull, Paul S. (2007). A Battle History of the Imperial Japanese Navy, 1941–1945. Annapolis: Naval Institute Press. ISBN 978-1-59114-219-5.
- Frei, Henry (2008). "Surrendering Syonan". In Akashi, Yōji; Yoshimura, Mako (eds.). New Perspectives on the Japanese Occupation in Malaya and Singapore, 1941–1945. Singapore: NUS Press. ISBN 978-9971-69-299-5.
- Huff, W.G. (1997). The Economic Growth of Singapore: Trade and Development in the Twentieth Century. Cambridge: Cambridge University Press. ISBN 0-521-62944-6.
- Hack, Karl; Blackburn, Kevin (2004). Did Singapore Have to Fall?: Churchill and the Impregnable Fortress. London: Routledge. ISBN 0-415-30803-8.
- Kirby, S. Woodburn (1965). The War Against Japan Volume IV: The Reconquest of Burma. History of the Second World War. United Kingdom Military Series. London: Her Majesty's Stationery Office.
- Liew, Kai Khiun (2006). "Labour Formation, Identity, and Resistance in HM Dockyard, Singapore (1921–1971)". International Review of Social History. 51 (3). The Netherlands: Internationaal Instituut voor Sociale Geschiedenis. ISSN 0020-8590.
- Middlebrook, Martin; Mahoney, Patrick (1979). Battleship: The Sinking of the Prince of Wales and the Repulse. Harmondsworth: Penguin Books. ISBN 0-14-004899-5.
- Park, Keith (August 1946). Air Operations in South East Asia 3rd May 1945 to 12th September 1945 (PDF). London: War Office. published in "No. 39202". The London Gazette (Supplement). 13 April 1951. pp. 2127–2172.
- Kratoska, Paul H. (2018). The Japanese Occupation of Malaya and Singapore, 1941-45: A Social and Economic History (Second ed.). Singapore: NUS Press. ISBN 9789971696382.
- Polmar, Norman (2004). The Enola Gay: The B-29 That Dropped the Atomic Bomb on Hiroshima. Washington, D.C.: Smithsonian National Air and Space Museum. ISBN 1-57488-859-5.
- Royal Navy (1995a). War with Japan. Volume IV The South-East Asia Operations and Central Pacific Advance. London: HMSO. ISBN 0-11-772820-9.
- Royal Navy (1995b). War with Japan. Volume V The Blockade of Japan. London: HMSO. ISBN 0-11-772820-9.
- Royal Navy (1995c). War with Japan. Volume VI Advance to Japan. London: HMSO. ISBN 0-11-772821-7.
- Toh, Boon Kwan (July 2009). ""It was a thrill to see rows of B-29s going through the sky" The American Strategic Bombing of Singapore, 1944–45". The Journal of Military History. 3. 73. Society for Military History.
- Wolk, Herman S. (2010). Cataclysm: General Hap Arnold and the Defeat of Japan. Denton: University of North Texas Press. ISBN 978-1-57441-281-9.
